= Catalogue of paintings in the National Gallery =

The Catalogue of paintings in the National Gallery, London is the collection catalogue listing the paintings of the National Gallery, London collection, as they were catalogued in 2010 by the Public Catalogue Foundation. The collection contains roughly 2,300 paintings by 750 artists, and only attributed artists are listed here. Painters with more than twenty works in the collection are Jean-Baptiste-Camille Corot, Carlo Crivelli, Anthony van Dyck, Francesco Guardi, Rembrandt van Rijn, Peter Paul Rubens, Jacob van Ruisdael, and David Teniers II. The only women artists with works in the collection are Artemisia Gentileschi, Marie Blancour, Rosa Bonheur, Rosalba Giovanna Carriera, Catharina van Hemessen, Judith Leyster, Rachel Ruysch, and Elisabeth Louise Vigée-LeBrun. The only British artists with works in the collection are William Boxall, John Constable, Thomas Gainsborough, William Hogarth, John Hoppner, John Callcott Horsley, John Jackson, Thomas Jones, Cornelis Janssens van Ceulen, Thomas Lawrence, John Linnell, Henry Raeburn, Joshua Reynolds, Martin Archer Shee, George Stubbs, Joseph Mallord William Turner, Richard Wilson, and Joseph Wright of Derby. However, because of the historical links between the National Gallery and its offshoot in the 19th century, Tate Britain, the National has in the past transferred and recalled works by British artists to and from its collection.

Some artists are represented in the collection with more than six artworks, but only a maximum of six per name are listed here.

== A ==
- Hans von Aachen (1552–1614) (Art UK): The Amazement of the Gods (Art UK)
- Niccolò dell'Abbate (1509–1571) (Art UK): The Death of Eurydice (Art UK)
- Johannes van der Aeck (1636–1682) (Art UK): An Old Woman seated sewing (Art UK)
- Pieter Coecke van Aelst (1502–1550) (Art UK): Donatrix: Right Hand Shutter (Art UK), Donor: Left Hand Shutter (Art UK), The Archangel Gabriel: reverse of left-hand shutter (Art UK), The Crucifixion: Central Panel (Art UK), The Virgin and Child Enthroned (Art UK), The Virgin Annunciate: reverse of right-hand shutter (Art UK)
- Andrea di Aloigi (1480–1521) (Art UK): The Virgin and Child (Art UK)
- Albrecht Altdorfer (1480–1538) (Art UK): Christ Taking Leave of His Mother (Art UK), Landscape with a Footbridge (Art UK)
- Jan van Amstel (c. 1500–1540) (Art UK): Itinerant Entertainers in a Brothel (Art UK)
- Andrea di Bonaiuto da Firenze (active 1343–1377) (Art UK): The Virgin and Child with Ten Saints (Art UK)
- Pierre Andrieu (1821–1892) (Art UK): Still Life with Fruit and Flowers (Art UK)
- Fra Angelico (1387–1455) (Art UK): Christ Glorified in the Court of Heaven: central panel (Art UK), Saint Romulus: frame panel (Art UK), The Dominican Blessed: outer left panel (Art UK), The Dominican Blessed: outer right panel (Art UK), The Forerunners of Christ with Saints and Martyrs (Art UK), The Virgin Mary with the Apostles and Other Saints (Art UK)
- Antonello da Messina (1430–1479) (Art UK): Christ Blessing (Art UK), Christ Crucified (Art UK), Portrait of a Man (Art UK), St. Jerome in His Study (Art UK), Salting Madonna (Art UK)
- Apollonio di Giovanni di Tommaso (c. 1414–1465) (Art UK): Desco da parto (Art UK)
- Arent Arentsz (1585–1631) (Art UK): Fishermen near Muiden Castle (Art UK)
- Spinello Aretino (1330–1410) (Art UK): Decorative Border (Art UK), Decorative Border (Art UK), Saint Michael and Other Angels (Art UK), Two Haloed Mourners (Art UK)
- Bernardino da Asola (c. 1490–1540) (Art UK): The Adoration of the Shepherds (Art UK), The Death of Saint Peter Martyr (Art UK), The Garden of Love (Art UK), The Madonna and Child (Art UK)
- Balthasar van der Ast (1593–1656) (Art UK): Flowers in a Vase with Shells and Insects (Art UK)
- Hendrick Avercamp (1585–1634) (Art UK): A Scene on the Ice near a Town (Art UK), A Winter Scene with Skaters near a Castle (Art UK)

== B ==
- Francesco Bacchiacca (1494–1557) (Art UK): Joseph pardons his Brothers (Art UK), Joseph receives his Brothers on their Second Visit to Egypt (Art UK), Marcus Curtius (Art UK)
- Sisto Badalocchio (1585 – after 1621) (Art UK): Christ carried to the Tomb (Art UK)
- Ludolf Bakhuizen (1631–1708) (Art UK): A Beach Scene with Fishermen (Art UK), A View across a River near Dordrecht (Art UK), An English Vessel and a Man-of-war in a Rough Sea off a Coast with Tall Cliffs (Art UK), Dutch Men-of-war and Small Vessels in a Fresh Breeze off Enkhuizen (Art UK), Dutch Men-of-war entering a Mediterranean Port (Art UK), The Eendracht and a Fleet of Dutch Men-of-war (Art UK)
- Alesso Baldovinetti (1425–1499) (Art UK): Portrait of a Lady in Yellow (Art UK)
- Hans Baldung (1484–1545) (Art UK): Portrait of a Man (Art UK), The Trinity and Mystic Pietà (Art UK)
- Hendrick van Balen the Elder (1575–1632) (Art UK): Pan pursuing Syrinx (Art UK)
- Peder Balke (1804–1887) (Art UK): The Tempest (Art UK)
- Jacopo de' Barbari (c. 1445–1516) (Art UK): A Sparrowhawk (Art UK)
- Barnaba da Modena (1361–1383) (Art UK): Pentecost (Art UK), The Coronation of the Virgin: The Trinity, The Virgin and Child, The Crucifixion (Art UK)
- Federico Barocci (1530–1612) (Art UK): Madonna of the Cat (Art UK)
- Fra Bartolomeo (1472–1517) (Art UK): The Madonna and Child with Saint John (Art UK), The Virgin adoring the Child with Saint Joseph (Art UK)
- Bartolomeo Veneto (c. 1480 – c. 1546) (Art UK): Lodovico Martinengo (Art UK), Portrait of a Young Lady (Art UK)
- Antoine-Louis Barye (1796–1875) (Art UK): The Forest of Fontainebleau (Art UK)
- Marco Basaiti (1496–1530) (Art UK): Portrait of a Young Man (Art UK), The Virgin and Child (Art UK)
- Jacopo Bassano (1510–1592) (Art UK): The Adoration of the Shepherds (Art UK), The Departure of Abraham (Art UK), The Good Samaritan (Art UK), The Purification of the Temple (Art UK), The Way to Calvary (Art UK)
- Bartholomeus van Bassen (1590–1652) (Art UK): Interior of a Church (Art UK), Interior of St Cunerakerk, Rhenen (Art UK)
- Lazzaro Bastiani (before 1430–1512) (Art UK): The Virgin and Child (Art UK)
- Pompeo Batoni (1708–1787) (Art UK): Portrait of John Scott of Banks Fee (Art UK), Portrait of Richard Milles (Art UK), Portrait of Humphry Morice, Time Orders Old Age to Destroy Beauty (Art UK)
- Lubin Baugin (c. 1610–1663) (Art UK): Holy Family with the Infant Saint John the Baptist, Saint Elizabeth and Three Figures (Art UK)
- Francisco Bayeu y Subías (1734–1795) (Art UK): Saint James being visited by the Virgin with a Statue of the Madonna of Pilar (Art UK)
- Giuseppe Bazzani (1690–1769) (Art UK): Saint Anthony of Padua with the Infant Christ (Art UK)
- Domenico Beccafumi (1484–1551) (Art UK): Marcia (Art UK), Tanaquil (Art UK), The Story of Papirius (Art UK)
- Jan Abrahamsz Beerstraaten (1622–1666) (Art UK): The Castle of Muiden in Winter (Art UK)
- Cornelis Pietersz Bega (1620–1664) (Art UK): An Astrologer (Art UK)
- Abraham Begeyn (1637–1697) (Art UK): Peasants with Cattle by a Ruin (Art UK)
- Gentile Bellini (c. 1429–1507) (Art UK): A Man with a Pair of Dividers (Art UK), Cardinal Bessarion and Two Members of the Scuola della Carità in prayer with the Bessarion Reliquary (Art UK), Doge Niccolò Marcello (Art UK), The Sultan Mehmet II (Art UK), The Virgin and Child Enthroned (Art UK)
- Giovanni Bellini (1435–1516) (Art UK): A Dominican, with the Attributes of Saint Peter Martyr (Art UK), Portrait of Doge Leonardo Loredan (Art UK), Madonna del Prato (Art UK), Portrait of Fra Teodoro of Urbino as Saint Dominic (Art UK), Saint Jerome reading in a Landscape (Art UK), The Adoration of the Kings (Art UK)
- Antonio de Bellis (c. 1616 – c. 1656) (Art UK): The Finding of Moses (Art UK)
- Bernardo Bellotto (1720–1780) (Art UK): A Caprice Landscape with Ruins (Art UK), Venice: Upper Reaches of the Grand Canal facing Santa Croce (Art UK)
- Ambrosius Benson (1484–1550) (Art UK): The Magdalen Reading (Art UK)
- Benvenuto di Giovanni (1436–1518) (Art UK): Saint Nicholas (Art UK), Saint Peter (Art UK), The Virgin and Child (Art UK), The Virgin and Child (Art UK)
- Nicolaes Pieterszoon Berchem (1620–1683) (Art UK): A Man and a Youth ploughing with Oxen (Art UK), A Peasant playing a Hurdy-Gurdy to a Woman and Child in a Woody Landscape, with Oxen, Sheep and Goats (Art UK), A Stag Hunt in a Forest (Art UK), Mountainous Landscape with Muleteers (Art UK), Peasants with Cattle fording a Stream (Art UK), Peasants with Four Oxen and a Goat at a Ford by a Ruined Aqueduct (Art UK)
- Dirck van Bergen (1645–1689) (Art UK): Two Calves, a Sheep and a Dun Horse by a Ruin (Art UK)
- Ambrogio Bergognone (c. 1453–1523) (Art UK): Christ carrying the Cross (Art UK), Saint Ambrose (Art UK), Saint Paul (Art UK), The Agony in the Garden (Art UK), The Virgin and Child (Art UK), The Virgin and Child with Saint Catherine of Alexandria and Saint Catherine of Siena (Art UK)
- Bernardino Bergognone (c. 1460–1470–1523) (Art UK): The Virgin and Child with Two Angels (Art UK)
- Gerrit Berckheyde (1638–1698) (Art UK): The Interior of the Grote Kerk, Haarlem (Art UK), The Market Place and the Grote Kerk at Haarlem (Art UK), The Market Place and Town Hall, Haarlem (Art UK)
- Bartolomé Bermejo (c. 1436–1440 – c. 1498) (Art UK): Saint Michael triumphant over the Devil with the Donor Antonio Juan (Art UK)
- Gian Lorenzo Bernini (1598–1680) (Art UK): Saints Andrew and Thomas (Art UK)
- Giovanni Battista Bertucci (1500–1530) (Art UK): The Incredulity of Saint Thomas (Art UK), The Virgin and Child in Glory (Art UK)
- Joachim Beuckelaer (1533–1574) (Art UK): The Four Elements: Air (Art UK), The Four Elements: Earth (Art UK), The Four Elements: Fire (Art UK), The Four Elements: Water (Art UK)
- Jan van Bijlert (1597–1671) (Art UK): Portrait of an Elderly Man and Woman, and a Younger Woman, outside a House (Art UK)
- Giovanni Biliverti (1576–1644) (Art UK): Saint Zenobius revives a Dead Boy (Art UK)
- Francesco Bissolo (c. 1470–1554) (Art UK): The Virgin and Child with Saint Paul and a Female Martyr (Art UK), The Virgin and Child with Saints Michael and Veronica and Two Donors (Art UK)
- Marie Blancour (1650–1699) (Art UK): A Bowl of Flowers (Art UK)
- Boccaccio Boccaccino (before 1466–1525) (Art UK): Christ carrying the Cross and the Virgin Mary Swooning (Art UK)
- Louis-Léopold Boilly (1761–1845) (Art UK): A Girl at a Window (Art UK)
- Ferdinand Bol (1616–1680) (Art UK): A Lady with a Fan (Art UK), An Astronomer (Art UK)
- Giovanni Antonio Boltraffio (1467–1516) (Art UK): A Man in Profile (Art UK), The Virgin and Child (1) (Art UK), The Virgin and Child (2) (Art UK)
- Benedetto Bonfigli (c. 1420–1496) (Art UK): The Adoration of the Kings, and Christ on the Cross (Art UK)
- Rosa Bonheur (1822–1899) (Art UK): The Horse Fair (Art UK)
- Bono da Ferrara (1430–1465) (Art UK): Saint Jerome in a Landscape (Art UK)
- Francesco Bonsignori (1455–1519) (Art UK): Portrait of an Elderly Man (Art UK), The Virgin and Child with Four Saints (Art UK)
- François Bonvin (1817–1887) (Art UK): Still Life with Book, Papers and Inkwell (Art UK), The Meadow (Art UK)
- Gerard ter Borch (1617–1681) (Art UK): A Woman playing a Theorbo to Two Men (Art UK), An Officer dictating a Letter (Art UK), Portrait of a Young Man (Art UK), Portrait of Hermanna van der Cruis (Art UK), The Swearing of the Oath of Ratification of the Treaty of Münster (Art UK)
- Paris Bordone (1500–1571) (Art UK): A Pair of Lovers (Art UK), Christ as The Light of the World (Art UK), Christ baptising Saint John Martyr (Art UK), Portrait of a Young Woman (Art UK), Portrait of a Young Woman (Art UK)
- Anthonie van Borssom (1631–1677) (Art UK): A Garden Scene with Waterfowl (Art UK)
- Johannes Bosboom (1817–1891) (Art UK): The Interior of the Bakenesserkerk, Haarlem (Art UK)
- Hieronymus Bosch (1450–1516) (Art UK): Christ Crowned with Thorns (Art UK)
- Pieter van den Bosch (1612–1673) (Art UK): A Woman scouring a Pot (Art UK)
- Ambrosius Bosschaert (1573–1621) (Art UK): A Still Life of Flowers in a Wan-Li Vase on a Ledge with further Flowers, Shells and a Butterfly (Art UK), Flowers in a Glass Vase (Art UK)
- Jan Dirksz Both (1618–1652) (Art UK): A Rocky Italian Landscape with Herdsmen and Muleteers (Art UK), A Rocky Landscape with an Ox-cart (Art UK), A Rocky Landscape with Peasants and Pack Mules (Art UK), A View on the Tiber, near the Ripa Grande, Rome (Art UK), Muleteers, and a Herdsman with an Ox and Goats by a Pool (Art UK), Peasants with Mules and Oxen on a Track near a River (Art UK)
- Sandro Botticelli (1444–1510) (Art UK): A Lady in Profile (Art UK), Adoration of the Kings (Art UK), Four Scenes from the Early Life of Saint Zenobius (Art UK), The Mystical Nativity (Art UK), Portrait of a Young Man (Art UK), Saint Francis of Assisi with Angels (Art UK)
- Francesco Botticini (1446–1497) (Art UK): Saint Jerome in Penitence with Saints and Donors (Art UK), Scenes from the Life of Saint Jerome (Art UK), The Assumption of the Virgin (Art UK), The Crucifixion (Art UK)
- François Boucher (1703–1770) (Art UK): Landscape with a Watermill (Art UK), Pan and Syrinx (Art UK), The Billet-Doux (Art UK)
- Eugène Boudin (1824–1898) (Art UK): Beach at Trouville (Art UK), Beach Scene, Trouville (Art UK), Beach Scene, Trouville (Art UK), Beach Scene, Trouville (Art UK), Brussels Harbour (Art UK), Deauville Harbour (Art UK)
- Louis de Boullogne (1654–1733) (Art UK): Nessus and Dejanira (Art UK)
- Sébastien Bourdon (1616–1671) (Art UK): The Return of the Ark (Art UK)
- Dieric Bouts (1415–1475) (Art UK): Christ Crowned with Thorns (Art UK), Christ Crowned with Thorns (Art UK), Mater Dolorosa (Art UK), Portrait of a Man (Jan van Winckele) (Art UK), The Entombment (Art UK), The Virgin and Child (Art UK)
- André Bouys (1656–1740) (Art UK): La Barre and Other Musicians (Art UK)
- William Boxall (1800–1879) (Art UK): Self Portrait at the Age of about Nineteen (Art UK)
- Bramantino (c. 1460–1530) (Art UK): The Adoration of the Kings (Art UK)
- Jan de Bray (1627–1697) (Art UK): Portrait of a Woman with a Black Cap (Art UK)
- Bartholomeus Breenbergh (1598–1657) (Art UK): The Finding of the Infant Moses by Pharaoh's Daughter (Art UK)
- Quirijn van Brekelenkam (1622–1670) (Art UK): A Woman Asleep by a Fire (Art UK), An Interior, with a Man and a Woman seated by a Fire (Art UK), Interior of a Tailor's Shop (Art UK)
- Andrea del Brescianino (c. 1485 – c. 1545) (Art UK): The Madonna and Child with the Infant Baptist and Saints Paul and Catherine of Siena (Art UK)
- Paul Bril (1554–1626) (Art UK): Diana and Callisto (Art UK)
- Bronzino (1503–1572) (Art UK): Venus, Cupid, Folly and Time (Art UK), Portrait of a Lady (Art UK), Portrait of Cosimo I de' Medici, Grand Duke of Tuscany (Art UK), Portrait of Piero de' Medici ("The Gouty") (Art UK), The Madonna and Child with Saint John the Baptist and Saint Elizabeth (Art UK)
- Adriaen Brouwer (1605–1638) (Art UK): Four Peasants in a Cellar (Art UK), Tavern Scene (Art UK)
- John Lewis Brown (1829–1892) (Art UK): The Performing Dog (Art UK)
- Pieter Bruegel the Elder (1526–1569) (Art UK): Landscape: A River among Mountains (Art UK), Adoration of the Kings (Art UK)
- Jan Brueghel the Elder (1568–1624) (Art UK): The Adoration of the Kings (Art UK)
- Hendrick ter Brugghen (1588–1629) (Art UK): A Man playing a Lute (Art UK), Jacob reproaching Laban for giving him Leah in place of Rachel (Art UK), The Concert (Art UK)
- Paul Theodor van Brussel (1754–1795) (Art UK): Flowers in a Vase (Art UK), Flowers in a Vase (Art UK), Fruit and Flowers (Art UK)
- Barthel Bruyn the Elder (1493–1553) (Art UK): A Man, probably of the Strauss Family (Art UK), The Virgin, Saint John, Saint Mary Magdalene and a Holy Woman (Art UK)
- Giovanni Buonconsiglio (c. 1465 – c. 1537) (Art UK): Saint John the Baptist (Art UK)
- Andrea Busati (1480–1510) (Art UK): The Entombment (Art UK)
- Bernardino Butinone (c. 1436 – c. 1507) (Art UK): The Adoration of the Shepherds (Art UK)
- Willem Pieterszoon Buytewech (1591–1624) (Art UK): A Dune Landscape (Art UK)

== C ==
- Alexandre Calame (1810–1864) (Art UK): The Lake of Thun (Art UK)
- Abraham van Calraet (1642–1722) (Art UK): A Boy holding a Grey Horse (Art UK), A Brown and White Skewbald Horse with a Saddle beside it (Art UK), Scene on the Ice outside Dordrecht (Art UK), The Interior of a Stable (Art UK)
- Pedro de Campaña (1503–1580) (Art UK): The Conversion of Mary Magdalene (Art UK)
- Bernardino Campi (1522–1591) (Art UK): Portrait of a Musician (Art UK)
- Robert Campin (1375–1444) (Art UK): A Man (YP), A Woman (Art UK), Portrait of a Franciscan (Art UK), The Virgin and Child before a Firescreen (Art UK), The Virgin and Child in an Apse with Two Angels (Art UK), The Virgin and Child in an Interior (Art UK)
- Canaletto (1697–1768) (Art UK): A Regatta on the Grand Canal (Art UK), Eton College (Art UK), London: Interior of the Rotunda at Ranelagh (Art UK), Venice: A Regatta on the Grand Canal (Art UK), The Stonemason's Yard (Art UK), Venice: Entrance to the Cannaregio (Art UK)
- Bartolomeo Caporali (c. 1420–1505) (Art UK): Saint Bartholomew (Art UK), Saint John the Baptist (Art UK), The Virgin and Child with Saints, Angels and a Donor (Art UK)
- Jan van de Cappelle (1626–1679) (Art UK): A Coast Scene, with a Small Dutch Vessel landing Passengers (Art UK), A Dutch Yacht firing a Salute as a Barge pulls away, and Many Small Vessels at Anchor (Art UK), A River Scene with a Dutch Yacht firing a Salute as Two Barges pull away (Art UK), A River Scene with a Large Ferry and Numerous Dutch Vessels at Anchor (Art UK), A River Scene with Dutch Vessels Becalmed (Art UK), A Small Dutch Vessel before a Light Breeze (Art UK)
- Caravaggio (1571–1610) (Art UK): Boy Bitten by a Lizard (Art UK), Salome with the Head of John the Baptist (Caravaggio), London (Art UK), Supper at Emmaus (Caravaggio), London (Art UK)
- Giovanni Cariani (c. 1485–1547) (Art UK): Francesco Albani (Art UK), The Virgin and Child with Saints Joseph and Lucy and a Woman and Boy at Prayer (Art UK)
- Angelo Caroselli (1585–1652) (Art UK): The Plague at Ashdod (Art UK)
- Girolamo da Carpi (1501–1557) (Art UK): Cardinal Ippolito de' Medici and Monsignor Mario Bracci (Art UK), The Adoration of the Kings (Art UK)
- Annibale Carracci (1560–1609) (Art UK): Christ appearing to Saint Anthony Abbot during his Temptation (Art UK), Domine quo vadis? (Art UK), Erminia takes Refuge with the Shepherds (Art UK), Marsyas and Olympus (Art UK), Putto gathering Grapes (Art UK), Saint John the Baptist seated in the Wilderness (Art UK)
- Antonio Marziale Carracci (c. 1583–1618) (Art UK): The Martyrdom of Saint Stephen (Art UK)
- Ludovico Carracci (1555–1619) (Art UK): Susannah and the Elders (Art UK), The Marriage of the Virgin (Art UK)
- Rosalba Carriera (1675–1757) (Art UK): Rosalba Carriera (Art UK)
- Vincenzo Catena (c. 1470–1531) (Art UK): A Warrior adoring the Infant Christ and the Virgin (Art UK), Portrait of a Young Man (Art UK), Portrait of the Doge, Andrea Gritti (Art UK), Saint Jerome in his Study (Art UK), The Madonna and Child with the Infant Saint John the Baptist (Art UK)
- Bernardo Cavallino (1616–1656) (Art UK): Christ driving the Traders from the Temple (Art UK)
- Mirabello Cavalori (1535–1572) (Art UK): A Discussion (Art UK)
- Gregorio di Cecco di Luca (c. 1390–1428) (Art UK): The Marriage of the Virgin (Art UK)
- Jean-Michel Cels (1819–1894) (Art UK): Tree study (Art UK)
- Giacomo Ceruti (1698–1767) (Art UK): Portrait of a Priest (Art UK)
- Cesare da Sesto (1477–1523) (Art UK): Salome (Art UK)
- Paul Cézanne (1839–1906) (Art UK): An Old Woman with a Rosary (Art UK), Avenue at Chantilly (Art UK), The Bathers (Art UK), Hillside in Provence (Art UK), Landscape with Poplars (Art UK), Self Portrait (Art UK)
- Philippe de Champaigne (1602–1673) (Art UK): Cardinal de Richelieu (Art UK), The Dream of Saint Joseph (Art UK), Triple Portrait of Cardinal de Richelieu (Art UK)
- Jean-Baptiste-Siméon Chardin (1699–1779) (Art UK): La Fontaine (The Water Cistern) (Art UK), Still Life with Bottle, Glass and Loaf (Art UK), The House of Cards (Art UK), The Young Schoolmistress (Art UK)
- Nicolas Toussaint Charlet (1792–1845) (Art UK): Children at a Church Door (Art UK)
- Antoine Chintreuil (1814–1873) (Art UK): House on the Cliffs near Fécamp (Art UK)
- Petrus Christus (1415–1476) (Art UK): Portrait of a Young Man (Art UK)
- Antonio Cicognara (1480 – after 1500) (Art UK): Mystic Figure of Christ (Art UK)
- Cimabue (1240–1302) (Art UK): The Virgin and Child Enthroned with Two Angels (Art UK)
- Giacomo Francesco Cipper (1664–1736) (Art UK): Head of a Man in Blue (Art UK), Head of a Man in Red (Art UK)
- Pieter Claesz (1597–1660) (Art UK): Still Life with Drinking Vessels (Art UK)
- Paul Jean Clays (1819–1900) (Art UK): Ships lying near Dordrecht (Art UK), Ships lying off Flushing (Art UK)
- Joos van Cleve (1485–1541) (Art UK): The Adoration of the Kings (Art UK), The Holy Family (Art UK)
- Pieter Codde (1599–1678) (Art UK): A Woman holding a Mirror (Art UK), Portrait of a Man, a Woman and a Boy in a Room (Art UK)
- Cima da Conegliano (c. 1459–1517/18) (Art UK): Christ Crowned with Thorns (Art UK), David and Jonathan (Art UK), Saint Jerome in a Landscape (Art UK), Saint Mark (Art UK), Saint Sebastian (Art UK), The Incredulity of Saint Thomas (Art UK)
- Pieter van Coninxloo (1460–1513) (Art UK): Margaret of Austria (Art UK), Philip the Handsome (Art UK)
- John Constable (1776–1837) (Art UK): Cenotaph to the Memory of Sir Joshua Reynolds, erected in the grounds of Coleorton Hall, Leicestershire by the late Sir George Beaumont, Bt. (Art UK), Salisbury Cathedral and Leadenhall from the River Avon (Art UK), Stratford Mill (Art UK), The Cornfield (Art UK), The Hay Wain (Art UK), Weymouth Bay: Bowleaze Cove and Jordon Hill (Art UK)
- Gonzales Coques (1614–1683) (Art UK): A Family Group (Art UK), Hearing (Art UK), Portrait of a Man (Art UK), Portrait of a Woman (Art UK), Portrait of a Woman as Saint Agnes (Art UK), Sight (Portrait of Robert van den Hoecke) (Art UK)
- Cornelis van Haarlem (1562–1637) (Art UK): The Preaching of Saint John the Baptist (Art UK), Two Followers of Cadmus devoured by a Dragon (Art UK)
- Jean-Baptiste-Camille Corot (1796–1875) (Art UK): A Flood (Art UK), A Peasant Woman (Art UK), A Wagon in the Plains of Artois (Art UK), Avignon from the West (Art UK), Cows in a Marshy Landscape (Art UK), Dardagny, Morning (Art UK)
- Antonio da Correggio (1489–1534) (Art UK): Christ presented to the People (Ecce Homo) (Art UK), Christ presented to the People (Ecce Homo) (Art UK), Christ taking Leave of his Mother (Art UK), Group of Heads (Art UK), Group of Heads (Art UK), Head of an Angel (Art UK)
- Pietro da Cortona (1596–1669) (Art UK): Saint Cecilia (Art UK)
- Francesco del Cossa (c. 1435 – c. 1477) (Art UK): Saint Vincent Ferrer (Art UK), Scenes from the Life of Saint Vincent Ferrer (Art UK)
- Lorenzo Costa (1460–1535) (Art UK): A Concert (Art UK), Portrait of Battista Fiera (Art UK), Saint John the Baptist (Art UK), Saint John the Evangelist (Art UK), Saint Peter (Art UK), Saint Philip (Art UK)
- Gustave Courbet (1819–1877) (Art UK): Beach Scene (Art UK), In the Forest (Art UK), Landscape (Art UK), Self Portrait (Art UK), Still Life with Apples and a Pomegranate (Art UK), The Diligence in the Snow (Art UK)
- Thomas Couture (1815–1879) (Art UK): Caught by the Tide (Art UK)
- Michiel Coxie (1499–1592) (Art UK): A Man with a Skull (Art UK)
- Lucas Cranach the Elder (1472–1553) (Art UK) (YP): Charity (Art UK), Cupid complaining to Venus (Art UK), Portrait of a Man, probably Johann Feige (Art UK), Portrait of a Woman (Art UK), Portrait of Johann Friedrich the Magnanimous (Art UK), Portrait of Johann the Steadfast (Art UK)
- Giuseppe Crespi (1665–1747) (Art UK): Saint Jerome in the Desert (Art UK)
- Carlo Crivelli (1430/35–1495) (Art UK): La Madonna della Rondine (The Madonna of the Swallow) (Art UK), Predella of La Madonna della Rondine (The Madonna of the Swallow) (Art UK), Saint Andrew (Art UK), Saint Catherine of Alexandria (Art UK), Saint Catherine of Alexandria (Art UK), Saint Dominic (Art UK)
- Aelbert Cuyp (1620–1691) (Art UK): A Distant View of Dordrecht, with a Milkmaid and Four Cows, and Other Figures ("The Large Dort") (Art UK), A Distant View of Dordrecht, with a Sleeping Herdsman and Five Cows ("The Small Dort") (Art UK), A Herdsman with Five Cows by a River (Art UK), A Herdsman with Seven Cows by a River (Art UK), A Hilly River Landscape with a Horseman talking to a Shepherdess (Art UK), A Horseman with a Cowherd and Two Boys in a Meadow, and Seven Cows (Art UK)

== D ==
- Bernardo Daddi (c. 1280–1348) (Art UK): The Coronation of the Virgin (Art UK)
- Henri-Pierre Danloux (1753–1809) (Art UK): The Baron de Besenval in his Salon de Compagnie (Art UK)
- Charles-François Daubigny (1817–1878) (Art UK): Alders (Art UK), Honoré Daumier (Art UK), Landscape with Cattle by a Stream (Art UK), River Scene with Ducks (Art UK), St Paul's from the Surrey Side (Art UK), The Garden Wall (Art UK)
- Honoré Daumier (1808–1879) (Art UK): Don Quixote and Sancho Panza (Art UK)
- Gerard David (1460–1523) (Art UK): Adoration of the Kings (Art UK), An Augustinian Friar Praying (Art UK), Canon Bernardijn Salviati and Three Saints (Art UK), Christ Nailed to the Cross (Art UK), Lamentation (Art UK), Saint Jerome in a Landscape (Art UK)
- Jacques-Louis David (1748–1825) (Art UK): Portrait of Jacobus Blauw (Art UK), Portrait of the Comtesse Vilain XIIII and her Daughter (Art UK)
- Cornelis Gerritsz Decker (1618–1678) (Art UK): A Cottage among Trees on the Bank of a Stream (Art UK)
- Edgar Degas (1834–1917) (Art UK): At the Café Châteaudun (Art UK), Ballet Dancers (Art UK), Beach Scene (Art UK), Combing the Hair ("La Coiffure") (Art UK), Hélène Rouart in her Father's Study (Art UK), Miss La La at the Cirque Fernando (Art UK), Young Spartans Exercising
- Eugène Delacroix (1798–1863) (Art UK): Abel Widmer (Art UK), Christ on the Cross (Art UK), Louis-Auguste Schwiter (Art UK), Ovid among the Scythians (Art UK)
- Paul Delaroche (1797–1856 ) (Art UK): The Execution of Lady Jane Grey (Art UK)
- Dirk van Delen (1605–1671) (Art UK): An Architectural Fantasy (Art UK)
- Simon Denis (1755–1813) (Art UK): Sunset in the Roman Campagna (Art UK)
- Olivier van Deuren (1666–1714) (Art UK): A Young Astronomer (Art UK)
- Benedetto Diana (c. 1460–1525) (Art UK): Salvator Mundi (Art UK)
- Narcisse Virgilio Díaz (1807–1876 ) (Art UK): Common with Stormy Sunset (Art UK), Cows at a Pool (Art UK), Sunny Days in the Forest (Art UK), The Storm (Art UK), Venus and Two Cupids (Art UK)
- Abraham Diepraam (1622–1670) (Art UK): A Peasant seated smoking (Art UK)
- Christian Wilhelm Ernst Dietrich (1712–1774) (Art UK): The Wandering Musicians (Art UK)
- Anthony van Dyck (1599–1641) (Art UK): Carlo and Ubaldo see Rinaldo conquered by Love for Armida (Art UK), Charity (Art UK), Drunken Silenus supported by Satyrs (Art UK), Equestrian Portrait of Charles I (Art UK), Lady Elizabeth Thimbelby and Dorothy, Viscountess Andover (Art UK), Lord John Stuart and his Brother, Lord Bernard Stuart (Art UK)
- Carlo Dolci (1616–1686) (Art UK): The Adoration of the Kings (Art UK), The Virgin and Child with Flowers (Art UK)
- Domenichino (1581–1641) (Art UK): Apollo and Neptune advising Laomedon on the Building of Troy (Art UK), Apollo killing the Cyclops (Art UK), Apollo pursuing Daphne (Art UK), Apollo slaying Coronis (Art UK), Landscape with Tobias laying hold of the Fish (Art UK), Mercury stealing the Herds of Admetus guarded by Apollo (Art UK)
- Domenico Veneziano (c. 1410–1461) (Art UK): Head of a Tonsured, Bearded Saint (Art UK), Head of a Tonsured, Beardless Saint (Art UK), The Virgin and Child Enthroned (Art UK)
- Gerard Donck (1600–1650) (Art UK): A Family Group (Jan van Hensbeeck and his Wife, Maria Koeck, and a Child ?) (Art UK)
- Dosso Dossi (1469–1542) (Art UK): A Bacchanal (Art UK), A Female Saint (Art UK), A Man embracing a Woman (Art UK), Lamentation over the Body of Christ (Art UK), The Adoration of the Kings (Art UK)
- Gerrit Dou (1613–1675) (Art UK): A Poulterer's Shop (Art UK), Portrait of a Man (Art UK), Portrait of a Young Woman (Art UK)
- Willem van Drielenburg (1632–1677) (Art UK): A Landscape with a View of Dordrecht (Art UK)
- Willem Drost (1633–1659) (Art UK): Portrait of a Young Woman with her Hands Folded on a Book (Art UK)
- François-Hubert Drouais (1727–1775) (Art UK): Le Comte de Vaudreuil (Art UK), Madame de Pompadour at her Tambour Frame (Art UK)
- Hendrick Dubbels (1621–1707) (Art UK): A Dutch Yacht and Other Vessels Becalmed near the Shore (Art UK)
- Claude-Marie Dubufe (1790–1864) (Art UK): The Surprise (Art UK)
- Duccio (1255–1319) (Art UK): The Healing of the Man Born Blind (Art UK), The Annunciation (Art UK), The Transfiguration (Art UK), The Virgin and Child with Four Angels (Art UK), The Virgin and Child with Saints Dominic and Aurea (Art UK)
- Joseph Ducreux (1735–1802) (Art UK): Portrait of a Man (Art UK)
- Gaspard Dughet (1615–1675) (Art UK): Imaginary Landscape with Buildings in Tivoli (Art UK), Landscape with a Cowherd (Art UK), Landscape with a Shepherd and his Flock (Art UK), Landscape with a Storm (Art UK), Landscape with Abraham and Isaac approaching the Place of Sacrifice (Art UK), Landscape with Elijah and the Angel (Art UK)
- Willem Cornelisz Duyster (1599–1635) (Art UK): Soldiers fighting over Booty in a Barn (Art UK), Two Men playing Tric-trac, with a Woman scoring (Art UK)
- Karel Dujardin (1626–1678) (Art UK): A Woman and a Boy with Animals at a Ford (Art UK), A Woman with Cattle and Sheep in an Italian Landscape (Art UK), Farm Animals in the Shade of a Tree, with a Boy and a Sleeping Herdswoman (Art UK), Portrait of a Young Man (Art UK), Sheep and Goats (Art UK), The Conversion of Saint Paul (Art UK)
- Jules Dupré (1811–1889 ) (Art UK): Willows, with a Man Fishing (Art UK)
- Albrecht Dürer (1471–1528) (Art UK): St. Jerome in the Wilderness (Art UK), The Painter's Father (Art UK), The Virgin and Child ("The Madonna with the Iris") (Art UK)
- Josephus Laurentius Dyckmans (1811–1888) (Art UK): The Blind Beggar (Art UK)

== E ==
- Christoffer Wilhelm Eckersberg (1783–1853) (Art UK): View of the Forum in Rome (Art UK)
- Gerbrand van den Eeckhout (1621–1674) (Art UK): Four Officers of the Amsterdam Coopers' and Wine-rackers' Guild (Art UK), Rebekah and Eliezer at the Well (Art UK)
- Adam Elsheimer (1578–1610) (Art UK): Saint Lawrence prepared for Martyrdom (Art UK), Saint Paul on Malta (Art UK), The Baptism of Christ (Art UK), Tobias and the Archangel Raphael returning with the Fish (Art UK)
- Caesar van Everdingen (1617–1678) (Art UK): Portrait of a Dutch Commander (Art UK)
- Allaert van Everdingen (1621–1675) (Art UK): A Saw-mill by a Torrent (Art UK)
- Jan van Eyck (1370–1441) (Art UK): A Young Man holding a Ring (Art UK), Marco Barbarigo (Art UK), Portrait of a Man ("Léal Souvenir") (Art UK), Portrait of a Man (Art UK), Arnolfini Portrait (Art UK)

== F ==
- François-Xavier Fabre (1766–1837) (Art UK): Italian Landscape (Art UK)
- Carel Fabritius (1622–1654) (Art UK): A View of Delft, with a Musical Instrument Seller's Stall (Art UK), A Young Man in a Fur Cap and a Cuirass (probably a Self Portrait) (Art UK)
- Barent Fabritius (1624–1673) (Art UK): The Adoration of the Shepherds (Art UK), The Naming of Saint John the Baptist (Art UK)
- Henri Fantin-Latour (1836–1904) (Art UK): A Basket of Roses (Art UK), Still Life with Glass Jug, Fruit and Flowers (Art UK), The Rosy Wealth of June (Art UK)
- Paulus Constantijn la Fargue (1728–1782) (Art UK): The Grote Markt at The Hague (Art UK)
- Gaudenzio Ferrari (c. 1475–1546) (Art UK): Christ rising from the Tomb (Art UK), Saint Andrew (Art UK), The Annunciation: the angel Gabriel (Art UK), The Annunciation: the Virgin Mary (Art UK)
- Juan de Flandes (1465–1519) (Art UK): Christ appearing to the Virgin with the Redeemed of the Old Testament (Art UK)
- Govert Flinck (1615–1660) (Art UK): Self Portrait aged 24 (Art UK)
- Vincenzo Foppa (1427/30 – 1515/16) (Art UK): The Adoration of the Kings (Art UK)
- Gherardo di Giovanni del Fora (1460–1497) (Art UK): The Combat of Love and Chastity (Art UK)
- Jean-Louis Forain (1852–1931) (Art UK): Legal Assistance (Art UK)
- Mariano José María Bernardo Fortuny y Marsal (1838–1874) (Art UK): The Bull-Fighter's Salute (Art UK)
- Jean-Honoré Fragonard (1732–1806) (Art UK): Interior Scene (Art UK), Psyche showing her Sisters her Gifts from Cupid (Art UK)
- Francesco di Antonio di Bartolomeo (c. 1393 – after 1433) (Art UK): The Virgin and Child with Six Angels and Two Cherubim (Art UK)
- Francesco Francia (1447–1517) (Art UK): Bartolomeo Bianchini (Art UK), Mourning over the Dead Christ (Art UK), Pietà (Art UK), The Virgin and Child with an Angel (Art UK), The Virgin and Child with Saint Anne and Other Saints (Art UK), The Virgin and Child with Two Saints (Art UK)
- Franciabigio (1482–1525) (Art UK): Portrait of a Knight of Rhodes (Art UK)
- Peter Franchoys (1606–1654) (Art UK): Portrait of Lucas Fayd'herbe (Art UK)
- Caspar David Friedrich (1774–1840) (Art UK): Winter Landscape (Art UK)
- Eugène Fromentin (1820–1876) (Art UK): The Banks of the Nile (Art UK)
- Bernardino Fungai (1460–1516) (Art UK): The Virgin and Child with Cherubim (Art UK)
- Francesco Furini (1600–1646) (Art UK): The Three Graces (Art UK)
- Jan Fyt (1611–1661) (Art UK): A Still Life with Fruit, Dead Game and a Parrot (Art UK), Dead Birds in a Landscape (Art UK)

== G ==
- Agnolo Gaddi (1345–1396) (Art UK): The Coronation of the Virgin (Art UK)
- Eduard Gaertner (1801–1877) (Art UK): The Friedrichsgracht, Berlin (Art UK)
- Thomas Gainsborough (1727–1788) (Art UK): Cornard Wood, near Sudbury, Suffolk (Art UK), Dr Ralph Schomberg (Art UK), John Plampin (Art UK), Mr and Mrs Andrews (Art UK), Mr and Mrs William Hallett ("The Morning Walk") (Art UK), Mrs Siddons (Art UK)
- Akseli Gallen-Kallela (1865–1931) (Art UK): Lake Keitele (Art UK)
- Garofalo (c. 1481–1559) (Art UK): A Pagan Sacrifice (Art UK), An Allegory of Love (Art UK), Saint Augustine with the Holy Family and Saint Catherine of Alexandria ("The Vision of Saint Augustine") (Art UK), Saint Catherine of Alexandria (Art UK), The Agony in the Garden (Art UK), The Holy Family with Saints John the Baptist, Elizabeth, Zacharias and Francis (Art UK)
- Paul Gauguin (1848–1903) (Art UK): A Vase of Flowers (Art UK), Bowl of Fruit and Tankard before a Window (Art UK)
- Giovanni Battista Gaulli (1639–1709) (Art UK): Portrait of Cardinal Marco Gallo (Art UK)
- Geertgen tot Sint Jans (1460–1495) (Art UK): Nativity at Night (Art UK)
- Girolamo Genga (1476–1551) (Art UK): A Jesse-Tree (Art UK)
- Justus van Gent (1430–1490) (Art UK): Music (Art UK), Rhetoric (Art UK)
- Théodore Géricault (1791–1824) (Art UK): A Horse frightened by Lightning (Art UK)
- Niccolò di Pietro Gerini (active 1366 – c. 1415) (Art UK): Frame Roundel (Art UK), Saint Paul: Right main tier panel (Art UK), Saint Peter: Left main tier panel (Art UK), Scenes from the Life of Saint John the Baptist (Art UK), The Baptism of Christ: main tier central panel (Art UK)
- Jean-Léon Gérôme (1824–1904) (Art UK): Portrait of Armand Gérôme (Art UK)
- Jacob de Gheyn III (1596–1641) (Art UK): Saint Paul seated reading (Art UK)
- Davide Ghirlandaio (1452–1525) (Art UK): The Virgin and Child with Saint John (Art UK)
- Domenico Ghirlandaio (1449–1494) (Art UK): A Legend of Saints Justus and Clement of Volterra (Art UK), Costanza Caetani (Art UK), Portrait of a Girl (Art UK), Portrait of a Young Man in Red (Art UK), The Virgin and Child (Art UK)
- Ridolfo Ghirlandaio (1483–1561) (Art UK): Portrait of Girolamo Benivieni (Art UK), The Procession to Calvary (Art UK)
- Michele Giambono (c. 1400 – c. 1462) (Art UK): A Saint with a Book (Art UK)
- Giampietrino (1520–1540) (Art UK): Christ carrying his Cross (Art UK), Salome (Art UK)
- Giannicola di Paolo (c. 1460–1544) (Art UK): The Annunciation (Art UK)
- Corrado Giaquinto (1703–1766) (Art UK): Apotheosis of the Spanish Monarchy (Art UK), Moses striking the Rock (Art UK), The Brazen Serpent (Art UK)
- Luca Giordano (1632–1705) (Art UK): A Homage to Velázquez (Art UK), Perseus turning Phineas and his Followers to Stone (Art UK), Saint Anthony of Padua miraculously restores the Foot of a Self-Mutilated Man (Art UK), The Martyrdom of Saint Januarius (Art UK), The Toilet of Bathsheba (Art UK)
- Francesco di Giorgio (1439–1502) (Art UK): Saint Dorothy and the Infant Christ (Art UK)
- Giorgione (1477–1510) (Art UK): A Man in Armour (Art UK), Homage to a Poet (Art UK), Il Tramonto (The Sunset) (Art UK), Nymphs and Children in a Landscape with Shepherds (Art UK), The Adoration of the Kings (Art UK)
- Giotto (1266–1337) (Art UK): Pentecost (Art UK), The Dead Christ and the Virgin (Art UK)
- Giovanni da Milano (active 1350-69 – after 1369) (Art UK): Christ and the Virgin with Saints (Art UK), Christ of the Apocalypse: central pinnacle panel (Art UK), Saint John the Baptist: right pinnacle panel (Art UK), The Virgin: Left pinnacle panel (Art UK)
- Giovanni dal Ponte (1385 – c. 1438) (Art UK): An Unknown Saint, Saint Cosmas and Saint Francis (Art UK), Saint Gabriel: left pinnacle panel (Art UK), Saint Michael: Roundel above-left panel (Art UK), Saints Bernard, Scholastica, Benedict and John the Baptist (Art UK), Saints Nicholas, Damian and Margaret: right pilaster (Art UK), Saints Peter, Romuald, Catherine of Alexandria and Jerome (Art UK)
- Giovanni da Udine (1487–1564) (Art UK): The Virgin and Child with Saints George, James the Greater and a Donor (Art UK)
- Giovanni di Nicola (active 1326–1358) (Art UK): Saint Anthony Abbot (Art UK)
- Giovanni di Paolo (1403–1482) (Art UK): Saint John the Baptist retiring to the Desert: predella (Art UK), Saints Fabian and Sebastian (Art UK), The Baptism of Christ: predella panel (Art UK), The Birth of Saint John the Baptist: predella panel (Art UK), The Head of John the Baptist brought to Herod: predella (Art UK)
- Giovanni Francesco da Rimini (c. 1420–1470) (Art UK): The Virgin and Child with Two Angels (Art UK)
- Giulio Romano (1499–1546) (Art UK): Saint Mary Magdalene borne by Angels (Art UK), The Attack on Cartagena (Art UK), The Continence of Scipio (Art UK), The Infant Jupiter guarded by the Corybantes on the Island of Crete (Art UK), The Intervention of the Sabine Women (Art UK), The Rape of the Sabines (Art UK)
- Gerolamo Giovenone (1486/1487–1555) (Art UK): The Virgin and Child with Saints and Donors (Art UK)
- Girolamo da Treviso (c. 1497–1544) (Art UK): The Adoration of the Kings (Art UK), The Madonna and Child with Angels, Saints and a Donor (Art UK)
- Hugo van der Goes (1440–1482) (Art UK): The Death of the Virgin (Art UK), The Nativity, at Night (Art UK), Virgin and Child (Art UK)
- Jan Mabuse (1478–1532) (Art UK): A Man holding a Glove (Art UK), A Young Princess (Dorothea of Denmark) (Art UK), An Elderly Couple (Art UK), Man with a Rosary (Art UK), The Adoration of the Kings (Art UK), The Magdalen (Art UK)
- Francisco Goya (1746–1828) (Art UK): A Picnic (Art UK), A Scene from El Hechizado por Fuerza ("The Forcibly Bewitched") (Art UK), Portrait of Doña Isabel de Porcel (Art UK), Don Andrés del Peral (Art UK), Portrait of the Duke of Wellington (Art UK)
- Jan van Goyen (1596–1656) (Art UK): A Cottage on a Heath (Art UK), A River Landscape (Art UK), A River Scene, with a Hut on an Island (Art UK), A River Scene, with Fishermen laying a Net (Art UK), A Scene on the Ice by a Drinking Booth: A Village in the Distance (Art UK), A Scene on the Ice near Dordrecht (Art UK)
- Benozzo Gozzoli (1420–1497) (Art UK): The Virgin and Child Enthroned among Angels and Saints (Art UK), The Virgin and Child Enthroned with Angels (Art UK), The Virgin and Child with Angels (Art UK)
- Francesco Granacci (1469–1543) (Art UK): Portrait of a Man in Armour (Art UK)
- El Greco (1541–1614) (Art UK): Christ Driving the Money Changers from the Temple (Art UK), Saint Jerome as Cardinal (Art UK), Saint Peter (Art UK), The Adoration of the Name of Jesus (Art UK), The Agony in the Garden of Gethsemane (Art UK)
- Jean-Baptiste Greuze (1725–1805) (Art UK): A Child with an Apple (Art UK), A Girl (Art UK), A Girl (Art UK), A Girl with a Lamb (Art UK), Portrait of a Man (Art UK)
- Francesco Guardi (1712–1793) (Art UK): A Caprice with a Ruined Arch (Art UK), A Caprice with Ruins on the Seashore (Art UK), A Gondola on the Lagoon near Mestre (Art UK), A Ruin Caprice (Art UK), A Ruin Caprice (Art UK), A View near Venice (Art UK)
- Guercino (1591–1666) (Art UK): A Bearded Man holding a Lamp (Art UK), Elijah fed by Ravens (Art UK), The Dead Christ mourned by Two Angels (Art UK), The Incredulity of Saint Thomas (Art UK)

== H ==
- Joris van der Haagen (1615–1669) (YP): A River Landscape (Art UK)
- Jan Cornelis Haccou (1798–1839) (Art UK): A Road by a Cottage (Art UK)
- Frans Hals (1582–1666) (Art UK): A Family Group in a Landscape (Art UK), Portrait of a Man holding Gloves (Art UK), Portrait of a Man in his Thirties (Art UK), Portrait of a Middle-Aged Woman with Hands Folded (Art UK), Portrait of a Woman (Art UK), Portrait of a Woman with a Fan (Art UK)
- Dirck Hals (1591–1656) (Art UK): A Party at Table (Art UK)
- Willem van Herp (1613–1677) (Art UK): Saint Anthony of Padua distributing Bread (Art UK)
- Henri Harpignies (1819–1916) (Art UK): A River Scene (Art UK), Autumn Evening (Art UK), Olive Trees at Menton (Art UK), River and Hills (Art UK), The Painter's Garden at Saint-Privé (Art UK)
- Willem Claeszoon Heda (1594–1680) (Art UK): Still Life: Pewter and Silver vessels and a Crab (Art UK), Still Life with a Lobster (Art UK)
- Gerret Willemsz Heda (1622–1649) (Art UK): Still Life with a Nautilus Cup (Art UK)
- Jan Davidsz. de Heem (1606–1683) (Art UK): Still Life (Art UK)
- Maarten van Heemskerck (1498–1574) (Art UK): The Donor and Saint Mary Magdalene (Art UK), The Virgin and Saint John the Evangelist (Art UK)
- Wolfgang Heimbach (c. 1610 – after 1678) (Art UK): Portrait of a Young Man (Art UK)
- Bartholomeus van der Helst (1613–1670) (Art UK): Portrait of a Girl in Pale Blue with an Ostrich Feather Fan (Art UK), Portrait of a Lady in Black Satin with a Fan (Art UK), Portrait of a Man in Black holding a Glove (Art UK)
- Caterina van Hemessen (1528–1587) (Art UK): A Lady with a Rosary (Art UK), Portrait of a Lady (Art UK), Portrait of a Man (Art UK)
- Wybrand Hendricks (1744–1831) (Art UK): Fruit, Flowers and Dead Birds (Art UK)
- Jean Hey (1471–1500) (Art UK): Charlemagne, and the Meeting of Saints Joachim and Anne at the Golden Gate (Art UK)
- Jan van der Heyden (1637–1712) (Art UK): A Farm among Trees (Art UK), A Square before a Church (Art UK), A View in Cologne (Art UK), An Architectural Fantasy (Art UK), An Imaginary View of Nijenrode Castle and the Sacristy of Utrecht Cathedral (Art UK), The Huis ten Bosch at The Hague (Art UK)
- Meindert Hobbema (1638–1709) (Art UK): A Road winding past Cottages (Art UK), A Stream by a Wood (Art UK), A Woody Landscape (Art UK), A Woody Landscape with a Cottage (Art UK), Cottages in a Wood (Art UK), The Avenue at Middelharnis (Art UK)
- William Hogarth (1697–1764) (Art UK): Marriage à-la-mode (Art UK), Marriage A-la-Mode: 2, The Tête à Tête (Art UK), Marriage A-la-Mode: 3, The Inspection (Art UK), Marriage A-la-Mode: 4, The Toilette (Art UK), Marriage A-la-Mode: 5, The Bagnio (Art UK), Marriage A-la-Mode: 6, The Lady's Death (Art UK)
- Hans Holbein the Younger (1497–1543) (Art UK): A Lady with a Squirrel and a Starling (Anne Lovell) (Art UK), Christina of Denmark, Duchess of Milan (Art UK), The Ambassadors (Art UK)
- Melchior d'Hondecoeter (1636–1695) (Art UK): A Cock, Hens and Chicks (Art UK), Birds, Butterflies and a Frog among Plants and Fungi (Art UK)
- Gerard van Honthorst (1592–1656) (Art UK): Christ before the High Priest (Art UK), Elizabeth Stuart, Queen of Bohemia (Art UK), Saint Sebastian (Art UK)
- Pieter de Hooch (1629–1683) (Art UK): A Man with Dead Birds, and Other Figures, in a Stable (Art UK), A Musical Party in a Courtyard (Art UK), A Woman and her Maid in a Courtyard (Art UK), An Interior, with a Woman Drinking with Two Men and a Maidservant (Art UK), The Courtyard of a House in Delft (Art UK)
- Samuel Dirksz van Hoogstraten (1627–1678) (Art UK): A Peepshow with Views of the Interior of a Dutch House (Art UK)
- John Hoppner (1758–1810) (Art UK): Sir George Beaumont (Art UK)
- John Callcott Horsley (1817–1903) (Art UK): Portrait of Martin Colnaghi (Art UK)
- Wolf Huber (1490–1553) (Art UK): Christ taking leave of his Mother (Art UK)
- Jan van Huchtenburg (1647–1733) (Art UK): A Battle (Art UK)
- Paul Huet (1803–1869) (Art UK): Trees in the Park at Saint-Cloud (Art UK)
- Jan Baptist Huysmans (1654–1716) (Art UK): A Cowherd in a Woody Landscape (Art UK)
- Jan van Huysum (1682–1749) (Art UK): Flowers in a Stone Vase (Art UK), Flowers in a Terracotta Vase (Art UK), Hollyhocks and Other Flowers in a Vase (Art UK)

== I ==
- Jean Auguste Dominique Ingres (1780–1867) (Art UK): Angelica saved by Ruggiero (Art UK), Madame Moitessier (Art UK), Monsieur de Norvins (Art UK), Oedipus and the Sphinx (Art UK), Pindar and Ictinus (Art UK), The Duc d'Orléans (Art UK)
- George Inness (1825–1894) (Art UK): The Delaware Water Gap (Art UK)
- Eugène Isabey (1803–1886) (Art UK): Grandfather's Birthday (Art UK), The Fish Market, Dieppe (Art UK)
- Adriaen Isenbrandt (1485–1551) (YP): The Entombment (Art UK), The Magdalen in a Landscape (Art UK)
- Jozef Israëls (1824–1911) (Art UK): An Old Man writing by Candlelight (Art UK), Fishermen carrying a Drowned Man (Art UK)

== J ==
- John Jackson (1778–1831) (Art UK): Reverend William Holwell Carr (Art UK), William Seguier (Art UK)
- Jacobello di Bonomo (active 1378–1385) (Art UK): The Man of Sorrows (Art UK) (attributed)
- Jacometto Veneziano (active 1472–1497) (YP): Portrait of a Boy (Art UK), Portrait of a Man (Art UK)
- Jacopo di Antonio (1427–1454) (Art UK): A Bishop (Donatus) and a Female Martyr (Antilla) (Art UK), Gabriel: Frame roundel left (Art UK), Left pilaster of an altarpiece (Art UK), Right pilaster of an altarpiece (Art UK), Saint John the Evangelist: altarpiece pinnacle right (Art UK), Saints Michael and John the Baptist: main tier left panel (Art UK)
- Jacopo di Cione (c. 1325 – c. 1399) (Art UK): Adoring Saints: Left main tier panel (Art UK), Adoring Saints: Right main tier panel (Art UK), Pentecost (Art UK), Seraphim, Cherubim and Adoring Angels: left pinnacle panel (Art UK), Seraphim, Cherubim and Adoring Angels: right pinnacle panel (Art UK), The Adoration of the Kings (Art UK)
- Hieronymus Janssens (1624–1693) (Art UK): Ladies and Gentlemen playing La Main Chaude (Art UK)
- Cornelis Janssens van Ceulen (1593–1661) (Art UK): Portrait of a Lady (Art UK)
- Thomas Jones (1742–1803) (Art UK): A Wall in Naples (Art UK)
- Johan Jongkind (1819–1891) (Art UK): River Scene (Art UK), Skating in Holland (Art UK), The Boulevard de Port-Royal, Paris (Art UK)
- Jacob Jordaens (1593–1678) (Art UK): Portrait of Govaert van Surpele and his Wife (Art UK), The Holy Family and Saint John the Baptist (Art UK), The Virgin and Child with Saints Zacharias, Elizabeth and John the Baptist (Art UK)
- Jens Juel (1745–1802) (Art UK): Joseph Greenway (Art UK)

== K ==
- Willem Kalf (1619–1693) (Art UK): Still Life with the Drinking-Horn of the Saint Sebastian Archers' Guild, Lobster and Glasses (Art UK)
- Thomas de Keyser (1596–1667) (Art UK): Portrait of Constantijn Huygens and his Clerk (Art UK)
- Gustav Klimt (1862–1918) (Art UK): Portrait of Hermine Gallia (Art UK)
- Christen Købke (1810–1848) (Art UK): Portrait of Wilhelm Bendz (Art UK), The Northern Drawbridge to the Citadel in Copenhagen (Art UK)
- Willem Koekkoek (1839–1895) (Art UK): View of Oudewater (Art UK)
- Philip de Koninck (1619–1688) (Art UK): An Extensive Landscape with a hawking party (Art UK), An Extensive Landscape with a road by a river (Art UK), An Extensive Landscape with a town in the middle distance (Art UK), An Extensive Landscape with houses in a wood and a distant town (Art UK)
- David de Coninck (1642–1701) (Art UK): Dead Birds and Game with Gun Dogs and a Little Owl (Art UK)

== L ==
- Jan de Lagoor (1620–1660) (Art UK): A Woody Landscape with a Stag Hunt (Art UK)
- Laurent de La Hyre (1605–1656) (Art UK): Allegory of Grammar (Art UK)
- Nicolas Lancret (1690–1743) (Art UK): A Lady in a Garden taking Coffee with some Children (Art UK), The Four Ages of Man: Childhood (Art UK), The Four Ages of Man: Maturity (Art UK), The Four Ages of Man: Old Age (Art UK), The Four Ages of Man: Youth (Art UK), The Four Times of Day: Afternoon (Art UK)
- Bernardino Lanini (c. 1509 – after 1581) (Art UK): The Madonna and Child with Saint Mary Magdalene, Saint Gregory, Saint Joseph and Saint Paul (Art UK)
- Nicolas de Largillière (1656–1746) (Art UK): Portrait of a Man (Art UK), Princess Rákóczi (Art UK)
- Pieter Lastman (1583–1633) (Art UK): Juno discovering Jupiter with Io (Art UK)
- Lieven van Lathem (1430–1493) (Art UK): The Virgin and Child with Saints and Donor (Art UK)
- Thomas Lawrence (1769–1830) (Art UK): John Julius Angerstein, aged about 55 (Art UK), John Julius Angerstein, aged over 80 (Art UK), Queen Charlotte (Art UK)
- Gregorio Lazzarini (1655–1730) (Art UK): Portrait of Antonio Correr (Art UK)
- Le Nain (1588–1648) (YP): Three Men and a Boy (Art UK), A Woman and Five Children (Art UK), Four Figures at a Table (Art UK), Adoration of the Shepherds (Art UK)
- Jean-Baptiste Le Prince (1734–1781) (Art UK): The Necromancer (Art UK)
- Juan de Valdés Leal (1622–1690) (Art UK): The Immaculate Conception of the Virgin, with Two Donors (Art UK)
- Leandro Bassano (1557–1622) (Art UK): Portrait of a Bearded Man (Art UK), The Tower of Babel (Art UK)
- Eustache Le Sueur (1616–1655) (Art UK): Alexander and his Doctor (Art UK), Christ on the Cross with the Magdalen, the Virgin Mary and Saint John the Evangelist (Art UK), Saint Paul preaching at Ephesus (Art UK)
- Ignacio de Léon y Escosura (1834–1901) (Art UK): A Man in 17th-Century Spanish Costume (Art UK)
- Leonardo da Vinci (1452–1519) (Art UK): An Angel in Green with a Vielle (Art UK), An Angel in Red with a Lute (Art UK), Narcissus (Art UK), The Virgin and Child with St Anne and St John the Baptist (Art UK), Virgin of the Rocks (Art UK)
- Stanislas Lépine (1835–1892) (Art UK): A Gateway behind Trees (Art UK), Nuns and Schoolgirls in the Tuileries Gardens, Paris (Art UK), The Pont de la Tournelle, Paris (Art UK)
- Lucas van Leyden (1494–1533) (Art UK): A Man aged 38 (Art UK), Lot's Daughters make their Father drink Wine (Art UK)
- Judith Leyster (1609–1660) (Art UK): A Boy and a Girl with a Cat and an Eel (Art UK)
- Liberale da Verona (c. 1445 – c. 1526) (Art UK): Dido's Suicide (Art UK), The Virgin and Child with Two Angels (Art UK)
- Girolamo dai Libri (c. 1474–1555) (Art UK): The Virgin and Child with Saint Anne (Art UK)
- Bernardino Licinio (c. 1489 – c. 1565) (Art UK): Portrait of Stefano Nani (Art UK), The Madonna and Child with Saint Joseph and a Female Martyr (Art UK)
- Jan Lievens (1607–1674) (Art UK): A Landscape with Tobias and the Angel (Art UK), Portrait of Anna Maria van Schurman (Art UK), Self Portrait (Art UK)
- Johannes Lingelbach (1622–1674) (Art UK): Peasants loading a Hay Cart (Art UK)
- John Linnell (1792–1882) (Art UK): Samuel Rogers (Art UK)
- Hendrik Frans van Lint (1684–1763) (Art UK): A Landscape with an Italian Hill Town (Art UK)
- Filippo Lippi (1406–1469) (Art UK): Angel (Left Hand) (Art UK), Angel (Right Hand) (Art UK), Beheading of Saint James the Greater: predella panel (Art UK), Saint Bernard's Vision of the Virgin (Art UK), Saint Jerome and the Lion: predella panel (Art UK), Saint Mamas in Prison thrown to the Lions: predella panel (Art UK)
- Filippino Lippi (1457–1504) (Art UK): An Angel Adoring (Art UK), Moses brings forth Water out of the Rock (Art UK), The Adoration of the Kings (Art UK), The Virgin and Child with Saint John (Art UK), The Virgin and Child with Saints Jerome and Dominic (Art UK), The Worship of the Egyptian Bull God, Apis (Art UK)
- Lippo di Dalmasio (c. 1353 – c. 1410) (Art UK): The Madonna of Humility (Art UK)
- Johann Liss (1590–1629) (Art UK): Judith in the Tent of Holofernes (Art UK)
- Stefan Lochner (c. 1400–1451) (Art UK): Saints Matthew, Catherine of Alexandria and John the Evangelist (Art UK)
- Alessandro Longhi (1733–1813) (Art UK): Caterina Penza (Art UK)
- Pietro Longhi (1702–1783) (Art UK): A Fortune Teller at Venice (Art UK), A Lady receiving a Cavalier (Art UK), A Nobleman kissing a Lady's Hand (Art UK), An Interior with Three Women and a Seated Man (Art UK), Exhibition of a Rhinoceros at Venice (Art UK)
- Ambrogio Lorenzetti (1290–1348) (Art UK): A Group of Poor Clares (Art UK)
- Pietro Lorenzetti (1280–1348) (Art UK): A Crowned Female Figure (Saint Elizabeth of Hungary?) (Art UK), A Female Saint in Yellow (Art UK), Saint Sabinus before the Governor of Tuscany (Art UK)
- Lorenzo di Credi (1459–1537) (Art UK): The Virgin adoring the Child (Art UK), The Virgin and Child (Art UK), The Virgin and Child with Two Angels (Art UK)
- Lorenzo Monaco (1370–1423) (Art UK): Adoring Saints: Left main tier panel (Art UK), Adoring Saints: Right main tier panel (Art UK), Incidents in the Life of Saint Benedict: predella panel (Art UK), Saint Benedict admitting Saints Maurus and Placidus into the Benedictine Orde (Art UK), Saint Benedict in the Sacro Speco at Subiaco (Art UK), The Baptism of Christ (Art UK)
- Lorenzo Veneziano (1356–1372) (Art UK): The Madonna of Humility with Saints Mark and John the Baptist (Art UK)
- Claude Lorrain (1604–1682) (Art UK): A Seaport (Art UK), A View in Rome (Art UK), Landscape with a Goatherd and Goats (Art UK), Landscape with Aeneas at Delos (Art UK), Landscape with Cephalus and Procris reunited by Diana (Art UK), Landscape with David at the Cave of Adullam (Art UK)
- Bernardino Loschi (c. 1460–1540) (Art UK): Portrait of Alberto Pio (Art UK)
- Johann Carl Loth (1632–1698) (Art UK): Mercury piping to Argus (Art UK)
- Lorenzo Lotto (1480–1556) (Art UK): Portrait of a Woman inspired by Lucretia (Art UK), Portrait of Giovanni della Volta with his Wife and Children (Art UK), The Physician Giovanni Agostino della Torre and his Son, Niccolò (Art UK), The Virgin and Child with Saints Jerome and Nicholas of Tolentino (Art UK)
- Lodewijck van Ludick (1629–1723) (Art UK): A River between Rocky Cliffs, with a Waterfall on the left (Art UK)
- Bernardino Luini (1480–1532) (Art UK): Christ (Art UK), Christ among the Doctors (Art UK), Saint Catherine (Art UK), The Virgin and Child (Art UK), The Virgin and Child with Saint John (Art UK)
- Gerrit Lundens (1622 – after 1683) (Art UK): The Company of Captain Banning Cocq and Lieutenant Willem van Ruytenburch ("The Nightwatch") (Art UK)
- Isaack Luttichuys (1616–1673): Portrait of a Girl (YP)
- Corneille de Lyon (1505–1575) (Art UK): Bust Portrait of a Man (Art UK), Portrait of a Man (Art UK), Portrait of a Man (Art UK), Portrait of a Woman (Art UK)

== M ==
- Gian Francesco de' Maineri (died 1505) (Art UK): The Virgin and Child Enthroned between a Soldier Saint, and Saint John the Baptist (La Pala Strozzi) (Art UK)
- Master of 1518 (1518) (Art UK): The Crucifixion (Art UK), The Flight into Egypt (Art UK), The Visitation of the Virgin to Saint Elizabeth (Art UK)
- Master of the Aachen Altar (active 1480–1520) (Art UK): The Crucifixion (Art UK)
- Master of the Albertini (c 1310–1315) (Art UK): The Virgin and Child with Six Angels (Art UK)
- Master of the Bruges Passion Scenes (active 1500) (Art UK): Christ presented to the People (Art UK)
- Master of the Legend of Saint Ursula (1499–1501) (Art UK): Saint Lawrence showing the Prefect the Treasures of the Church (Art UK), The Virgin and Child with Two Angels (Art UK)
- Master of Cappenberg (1465 – c. 1527) (Art UK): Christ before Pilate (Art UK), The Coronation of the Virgin (Art UK)
- Master of the Castello Nativity (1445–1475) (Art UK): The Nativity (Art UK)
- Master of the Clarisse Panel (active 1285) (Art UK): The Virgin and Child (Art UK)
- Master of Delft (born c. 1470) (Art UK): Christ presented to the People: left-hand panel (Art UK), The Crucifixion: central panel (Art UK), The Deposition: right hand panel (Art UK)
- Master of the Female Half-Lengths (1530–1540) (Art UK): A Female Head (Art UK), Saint Christopher carrying the Infant Christ (Art UK), Saint John on Patmos (Art UK), The Rest on the Flight into Egypt (Art UK)
- Master of Saint Giles (active c. 1500) (Art UK): Saint Giles and the Hind (Art UK), The Mass of Saint Giles (Art UK)
- Master of the Griselda Legend (active 1490s) (Art UK): The Story of Griselda, Part I: Marriage (Art UK), The Story of Griselda, Part II: Exile (Art UK), The Story of Griselda, Part III: Reunion (Art UK)
- Master of the Lehman Crucifixion (active 1370s) (Art UK): Noli me Tangere (Art UK)
- Master of Liesborn (active 1465) (Art UK): Head of Christ Crucified: fragment of the Crucifixion (Art UK), Saint Dorothy (Art UK), Saint Margaret (Art UK), Saints Ambrose, Exuperius and Jerome (Art UK), Saints Cosmas and Damian and the Virgin: fragment (Art UK), Saints Gregory, Maurice and Augustine (Art UK)
- Master of the Life of the Virgin (1463–1480) (Art UK): Saints Augustine, Hubert, Ludger and Gereon (Art UK), Saints Jerome, Bernard, Giles and Benedict (Art UK), The Conversion of Saint Hubert: left-hand shutter (Art UK), The Mass of Saint Hubert: right-hand shutter (Art UK), The Presentation in the Temple (Art UK)
- Master of the Legend of the Magdalen (c. 1483 – c. 1530 ) (Art UK): The Magdalen (Art UK), The Magdalen Weeping (Art UK)
- Master of the Mansi Magdalen (1510–1530) (Art UK): Judith and the Infant Hercules (Art UK)
- Master of Marradi (active 1480–1500) (Art UK): The Story of the Schoolmaster of Falerii (Art UK)
- Master of the Mornauer Portrait (active 1460–1488) (Art UK): Portrait of Alexander Mornauer (Art UK)
- Master of the Osservanza Triptych (1430–1450) (Art UK): The Birth of the Virgin (Art UK)
- Master of the Pala Sforzesca (c. 1490–c. 1500) (Art UK): Saint Paul (Art UK), The Virgin and Child with Saints and Donors (Art UK)
- Master of the Prodigal Son (c. 1530–1560) (Art UK): The Dead Christ supported by the Virgin and Saint John (Art UK)
- Master of Riglos (active 1435–1460) (Art UK): The Crucifixion (Art UK)
- Master of the Blessed Clare of Rimini (c. 1333–1340) (Art UK): Vision of the Blessed Clare of Rimini (Art UK)
- Master of Saint Veronica (1400–1420) (Art UK): Saint Veronica with the Sudarium (Art UK)
- Master of the Saint Bartholomew Altarpiece (1465–1510) (Art UK): Saints Peter and Dorothy (Art UK), The Deposition (Art UK), The Virgin and Child in Glory with Saint James the Great and Saint Cecilia (Art UK), The Virgin and Child with Musical Angels (Art UK)
- Master of Saint Francis (active 1260–1280) (Art UK): Crucifix (Art UK)
- Master of the View of Saint Gudule (1480–1499) (Art UK): Portrait of a Young Man (Art UK)
- Master of the Palazzo Venezia Madonna (active 1340–1360) (Art UK): Saint Mary Magdalene (Art UK), Saint Peter (Art UK)
- Zanobi Machiavelli (c. 1418–1479) (Art UK): A Bishop Saint and Saint Nicholas of Tolentino (Art UK), Saint Bartholomew and Saint Monica (Art UK), Saint John the Baptist and Saint John the Evangelist (Art UK), Saint Mark and Saint Augustine (Art UK), The Virgin and Child (Art UK)
- Girolamo Macchietti (1535–1592) (Art UK): A Knight of S. Stefano (Art UK), The Charity of St Nicholas of Bari (Art UK)
- Raimundo de Madrazo y Garreta (1841–1920) (Art UK): Portrait of a Lady (Art UK)
- Nicolaes Maes (1634–1693) (Art UK): A Little Girl rocking a Cradle (Art UK), A Woman scraping Parsnips, with a Child standing by her (Art UK), Christ blessing the Children (Art UK), Interior with a Sleeping Maid and her Mistress ("The Idle Servant") (Art UK), Portrait of a Man in a Black Wig (Art UK), Portrait of an Elderly Man in a Black Robe (Art UK)
- Antonio Mancini (1852–1930) (Art UK): Aurelia (Art UK), On a Journey (Art UK), The Customs (Art UK), The Marquis del Grillo (Art UK)
- Édouard Manet (1832–1883) (Art UK): Corner of a Café-Concert (Art UK), Eva Gonzalès (Art UK), Music in the Tuileries (Art UK), The Execution of Emperor Maximilian (Art UK)
- Giovanni di Niccolò Mansueti (1485–1526) (Art UK): Symbolic Representation of the Crucifixion (Art UK)
- Andrea Mantegna (1430–1506) (Art UK): A Woman Drinking (Art UK), Noli me Tangere (Art UK), Samson and Delilah (Art UK), The Agony in the Garden (Art UK), The Holy Family with Saint John (Art UK), The Introduction of the Cult of Cybele at Rome (Art UK)
- Margaritone d'Arezzo (1216–1293) (Art UK): The Virgin and Child Enthroned, with Scenes of the Nativity and the Lives of the Saints (Art UK)
- Michele Marieschi (1710–1743) (Art UK): Buildings and Figures near a River with Rapids (Art UK), Buildings and Figures near a River with Shipping (Art UK)
- Jacob Maris (1837–1899) (Art UK): A Beach (Art UK), A Drawbridge in a Dutch Town (Art UK), A Girl feeding a Bird in a Cage (Art UK), A Girl seated outside a House (Art UK), A Windmill and Houses beside water with a stormy sky (Art UK), A Young Woman nursing a Baby (Art UK)
- Matthijs Maris (1839–1917) (Art UK): Men unloading Carts, Montmartre (Art UK)
- Willem Maris (1844–1910) (Art UK): Ducks alighting on a Pool (Art UK)
- Simon Marmion (1420–1489) (Art UK): A Choir of Angels: from left-hand shutter (Art UK), Saint Clement and a Donor (Art UK), The Soul of Saint Bertin carried up to God (Art UK)
- Hendrik Martenszoon Sorgh (1610–1670) (Art UK): A Woman playing Cards with Two Peasants (Art UK), Two Lovers at Table (Art UK)
- Marco Marziale (1492–1507) (Art UK): The Circumcision (Art UK), The Virgin and Child Enthroned with Saints Gall, John the Baptist, Roch and Bartholomew (Art UK)
- Masaccio (1401–1428) (Art UK): Saints Jerome and John the Baptist (Art UK), Madonna and Child (Art UK)
- Masolino da Panicale (1383–1447) (YP): A Pope (Saint Gregory) and Saint Matthias (Art UK)
- Quentin Matsys (1466–1530) (Art UK): A Donor (Art UK), A Female Figure standing in a Niche (Art UK), The Ugly Duchess (Art UK), Christ (Art UK), Saint Luke painting the Virgin and Child (Art UK), The Crucifixion (Art UK)
- Massimo Stanzione (1586–1656) (Art UK): Monks and Holy Women mourning over the Dead Christ (Art UK)
- Henri Matisse (1869–1954) (Art UK): Portrait of Greta Moll (Art UK)
- Matteo di Giovanni (c. 1430–1495) (Art UK): Christ Crowned with Thorns (Art UK), Saint Sebastian (Art UK), The Assumption of the Virgin (Art UK)
- Juan Bautista Martínez del Mazo (1612–1667) (Art UK): Don Adrián Pulido Pareja (Art UK), Queen Mariana of Spain in Mourning (Art UK)
- Damiano Mazza (c. 1500–1550) (Art UK): The Rape of Ganymede (Art UK)
- Filippo Mazzola (c. 1460–1505) (Art UK): The Virgin and Child with Saint Jerome and the Blessed Bernardino da Feltre (Art UK)
- Ludovico Mazzolino (c. 1480 – c. 1530) (Art UK): Christ and the Woman taken in Adultery (Art UK), Christ disputing with the Doctors (Art UK), The Holy Family with Saint Francis (Art UK), The Holy Family with Saint Nicholas of Tolentino (Art UK), The Nativity (Art UK)
- Jean-Louis-Ernest Meissonier (1815–1891) (Art UK): A Man in Black smoking a Pipe (Art UK)
- Luis Egidio Meléndez (1716–1780) (Art UK): Still Life with Lemons and Oranges (Art UK), Still Life with Oranges and Walnuts (Art UK)
- Altobello Melone (c. 1490–before 1543) (Art UK): Christ carrying the Cross (Art UK), The Road to Emmaus (Art UK)
- Hans Memling (1430–1494) (Art UK): A Young Man at Prayer (Art UK), Saint John the Baptist (Art UK), Saint John the Baptist (Art UK), Saint John the Evangelist (Art UK), Saint Lawrence (Art UK), The Virgin and Child with an Angel, Saint George and a Donor (Art UK)
- Giusto de' Menabuoi (c. 1320–1391) (Art UK): The Coronation of the Virgin, and Other Scenes (Art UK)
- Adolph Menzel (1815–1905) (Art UK): Afternoon in the Tuileries Gardens (Art UK)
- Philippe Mercier (c. 1689–1760) (Art UK): Portrait of a Man (Art UK)
- Gabriël Metsu (1629–1667) (Art UK): A Man and a Woman seated by a Virginal (Art UK), A Woman seated at a Table and a Man tuning a Violin (Art UK), A Young Woman seated drawing (Art UK), An Old Woman with a Book (Art UK), The Interior of a Smithy (Art UK), Two Men with a Sleeping Woman (Art UK)
- Adam Frans van der Meulen (1632–1690) (Art UK): Philippe-François d'Arenberg saluted by the Leader of a Troop of Horsemen (Art UK)
- Georges Michel (1763–1843) (Art UK): Landscape with Trees, Buildings and a Road (Art UK), Stormy Landscape with Ruins on a Plain (Art UK)
- Michelangelo (1475–1564) (Art UK): Leda and the Swan (Art UK), The Dream of Human Life (Art UK), The Entombment (Art UK), Manchester Madonna (Art UK)
- Michele da Verona (c. 1470–1536/1544) (Art UK): Coriolanus persuaded by his Family to spare Rome (Art UK)
- Michiel Jansz. van Mierevelt (1567–1641) (Art UK): Portrait of a Woman (Art UK)
- Frans van Mieris the Elder (1635–1681) (Art UK): A Woman in a Red Jacket feeding a Parrot (Art UK), An Old Fiddler (Art UK), Portrait of the Artist's Wife, Cunera van der Cock (Art UK), Self Portrait of the Artist, with a Cittern (Art UK)
- Willem van Mieris (1662–1747) (Art UK): A Woman and a Fish-pedlar in a Kitchen (Art UK)
- Pierre Mignard (1612–1695) (Art UK): The Marquise de Seignelay and Two of her Sons (Art UK)
- Francisque Millet (1642–1679) (Art UK): Mountain Landscape with Lightning (Art UK)
- Jean-François Millet (1814–1875) (Art UK): Landscape with Buildings (Art UK), The Whisper (Art UK), The Winnower (Art UK)
- Girolamo Mocetto (c. 1458–1531) (Art UK): The Massacre of the Innocents (Art UK), The Massacre of the Innocents with Herod (Art UK)
- Pier Francesco Mola (1612–1666) (Art UK): Leda and the Swan (Art UK), Saint John the Baptist preaching in the Wilderness (Art UK), The Rest on the Flight into Egypt (Art UK)
- Jan Miense Molenaer (1610–1668) (Art UK): A Young Man playing a Theorbo and a Young Woman playing a Cittern (Art UK), Two Boys and a Girl making Music (Art UK)
- Joos de Momper (1564–1635) (Art UK): A Music Party before a Village (Art UK)
- Claude Monet (1840–1926) (Art UK): Bathers at La Grenouillère (Art UK), Flood Waters (Art UK), Irises (Art UK), La Pointe de la Hève, Sainte-Addresse (Art UK), Lavacourt under Snow (Art UK), Snow Scene at Argenteuil (Art UK)
- Bartolomeo Montagna (c. 1450–1523) (Art UK): Saint Zeno, Saint John the Baptist and a Female Martyr (Art UK), The Virgin and Child (Art UK), The Virgin and Child (Art UK), The Virgin and Child (Art UK)
- Adolphe Joseph Thomas Monticelli (1824–1886) (Art UK): A Vase of Wild Flowers (Art UK), Conversation Piece (Art UK), Fountain in a Park (Art UK), Meeting Place of the Hunt (Art UK), Still Life of fruit (Art UK), Still Life with oysters and fish (Art UK)
- Antonis Mor (1520–1576) (Art UK): Portrait of a Man (Art UK)
- Luis de Morales (c. 1509–1520 – c. 1586) (Art UK): Virgin and Child (Art UK)
- Paolo Moranda Cavazzola (c. 1486–1522) (Art UK): Saint Roch (Art UK), The Virgin and Child, Saint John the Baptist and an Angel (Art UK)
- Gustave Moreau (1826–1898) (Art UK): St George and the Dragon (Art UK)
- Moretto da Brescia (c. 1498–1554) (Art UK): An Adoring Angel (Art UK), An Adoring Angel (Art UK), Christ blessing Saint John the Baptist (Art UK), Portrait of a Man (Art UK), Portrait of Count Fortunato Martinengo Cesaresco (Art UK), Praying Man with a Long Beard (Art UK)
- Berthe Morisot (1841–1895) (Art UK): Summer's Day (Art UK)
- Domenico Morone (c. 1442 – c. 1518) (Art UK): The Rape of the Sabines (after the signal) (Art UK), The Rape of the Sabines (before the signal) (Art UK)
- Francesco Morone (c. 1471–1529) (Art UK): Virgin and Child (Art UK)
- Giovanni Battista Moroni (1525–1578) (Art UK): Knight with his Jousting Helmet ("Il Cavaliere dal Piede Ferito', Conte Faustino Avogadro) (Art UK), Bust Portrait of a Young Man with an Inscription (Art UK), Canon Ludovico di Terzi (Art UK), Portrait of a Gentleman with his Helmet on a Column Shaft (Art UK), Portrait of a Lady, perhaps Contessa Lucia Albani Avogadro ("La Dama in Rosso") (Art UK), Portrait of a Left-Handed Gentleman with Two Quartos and a Letter ("Il Gentile Cavaliere") (Art UK)
- Jan Mostaert (1465–1553) (Art UK): Christ Crowned with Thorns (Art UK), The Head of Saint John the Baptist, with Mourning Angels and Putti (Art UK)
- Frederik de Moucheron (1633–1686) (Art UK): A Landscape with Classical Ruins (Art UK), Figures in an Italian Garden with Fountains and Statuary (Art UK)
- Bartolomé Esteban Murillo (1617–1682) (Art UK): A Peasant Boy leaning on a Sill (Art UK), A Young Man Drinking (Art UK), Christ healing the Paralytic at the Pool of Bethesda (Art UK), Portrait of Don Justino de Neve (Art UK), Saint John the Baptist in the Wilderness (Art UK), Self Portrait (Art UK)

== N ==
- Nardo di Cione (1343–1366) (Art UK): Saint John the Baptist with Saint John the Evangelist and Saint James (Art UK)
- Jean-Marc Nattier (1685–1766) (Art UK): Manon Balletti (Art UK), Portrait of a Man in Armour (Art UK)
- Nazario Nazari (1724 – after 1793) (Art UK): Andrea Tron (Art UK)
- Pieter Neeffs I (1568–1656) (Art UK): View of a Chapel at Evening (Art UK), An Evening Service in a Church (Art UK)
- Eglon van der Neer (1634–1703) (Art UK): Judith (Art UK)
- Aert van der Neer (1603–1677) (Art UK): A Frozen River by a Town at Evening (Art UK), A Frozen River near a Village, with Golfers and Skaters (Art UK), A Landscape with a River at Evening (Art UK), A River Landscape with a Village (Art UK), A River near a Town, by Moonlight (Art UK), A View along a River near a Village at Evening (Art UK)
- Caspar Netscher (1639–1684) (Art UK): A Lady at a Spinning-wheel (Art UK), A Lady teaching a Child to read, and a Child playing with a Dog ("La Maîtresse d'école") (Art UK), A Musical Party (Art UK), Portrait of a Lady (Art UK), Portrait of a Lady and a Girl (Art UK), Portrait of a Young Man (Art UK)
- Nicolas Neufchatel (c. 1527–1590) (Art UK): Portrait of a Young Lady (Art UK)
- Niccolò Alunno (c. 1420–1502) (Art UK): Christ on the Cross, and Other Scenes (Art UK)
- Niccolò di Buonaccorso (1356–1388) (Art UK): The Marriage of the Virgin (Art UK)
- François de Nomé (1593–1644) (Art UK): Fantastic Ruins with Saint Augustine and the Child (Art UK)
- Michiel Nouts (1628–1693) (Art UK): A Family Group (Art UK)
- Allegretto Nuzi (c. 1315–1373) (YP): Saint Catherine and Saint Bartholomew (Art UK)

== O ==
- Jacob Ochtervelt (1634–1682) (Art UK): A Woman playing a Virginal, Another singing and a Man playing a Violin (Art UK), A Woman standing at a Harpsichord, a Man seated by her (Art UK), A Young Lady trimming her Fingernails, attended by a Maidservant (Art UK)
- Marco d' Oggiono (c. 1475–1530) (YP): The Virgin and Child (Art UK)
- Jan Olis (1610–1676) (Art UK): A Musical Party (Art UK)
- Johann Heinrich Ferdinand Olivier (1785–1841) (Art UK): Abraham and Isaac (Art UK)
- Crescenzio Onofri (1632–1698) (Art UK): Landscape with Figures (Art UK), Landscape with Fishermen (Art UK)
- Jacob van Oost (1603–1671) (Art UK): Portrait of a Boy aged 11 (Art UK), Two Boys before an Easel (Art UK)
- Pietro di Francesco degli Orioli (1458–1496) (Art UK): Scenes from the Passion: predella (Art UK), The Nativity with Saints (Art UK)
- Giovanni da Oriolo (died 1474) (Art UK): Leonello d'Este (Art UK)
- Bernard van Orley (1490–1541) (Art UK): The Virgin and Child in a Landscape (Art UK)
- Lelio Orsi (1511–1587) (Art UK): The Walk to Emmaus (Art UK)
- Ortolano (1485 – c. 1527) (Art UK): Saints Sebastian, Roch and Demetrius (Art UK)
- Jan van Os (1744–1808) (Art UK): Dutch Vessels in Calm Water (Art UK), Fruit and Flowers in a Terracotta Vase (Art UK), Fruit, Flowers and a Fish (Art UK)
- Georgius Jacobus Johannes van Os (1782–1861) (Art UK): Fruit, Flowers and Game (Art UK)
- Adriaen van Ostade (1610–1685) (Art UK): A Cobbler (Art UK), A Peasant courting an Elderly Woman (Art UK), A Peasant holding a Jug and a Pipe (Art UK), An Alchemist (Art UK), The Interior of an Inn with Nine Peasants and a Hurdy-Gurdy Player (Art UK)
- Isaac van Ostade (1621–1649) (Art UK): A Farmyard (Art UK), A Landscape with Peasants and a Cart (Art UK), A Winter Scene (Art UK), An Inn by a Frozen River (Art UK), The Interior of a Barn with Two Peasants (Art UK), The Outskirts of a Village, with a Horseman (Art UK)

== P ==
- Michael Pacher (c. 1435–1498) (Art UK): The Virgin and Child Enthroned with Angels and Saints (Art UK)
- Padovanino (1588–1649) (Art UK): Cornelia and her Sons (Art UK)
- Jacopo Palma il Giovane (1546–1628) (Art UK): Mars and Venus (Art UK)
- Palma Vecchio (1479–1528) (Art UK): A Blonde Woman (Art UK), Portrait of a Poet (Art UK), Saint George and a Female Saint (Art UK)
- Marco Palmezzano (c. 1459 – c. 1539) (Art UK): The Dead Christ in the Tomb, with the Virgin Mary and Saints (Art UK)
- Giovanni Paolo Panini (1691–1765) (Art UK): Roman Ruins with Figures (Art UK), Rome: The interior of St. Peter's (Art UK), The Lottery in Piazza di Montecitorio (Art UK)
- Paolo da San Leocadio (c. 1445 – c. 1520) (Art UK): The Virgin and Child with Saints (Art UK)
- Paolo Fiammingo (c. 1540–1596) (Art UK): Landscape with a Scene of Enchantment (Art UK), Landscape with the Expulsion of the Harpies (Art UK)
- Abraham de Pape (1620–1666) (Art UK): Tobit and Anna (Art UK)
- Luis Paret y Alcázar (1746–1799) (Art UK): View of El Arenal de Bilbao (Art UK)
- Parmigianino (1503–1540) (Art UK): Portrait of a Collector (Art UK), Vision of Saint Jerome (Art UK), The Mystic Marriage of Saint Catherine (Art UK)
- Joseph Parrocel (1646–1704) (Art UK): The Boar Hunt (Art UK), The Return from the Hunt (Art UK)
- Pierre Patel (1605–1676) (Art UK): Landscape with the Rest on the Flight into Egypt (Art UK)
- Jean-Baptiste Pater (1695–1736) (Art UK): The Dance (Art UK)
- Joachim Patinir (1480–1524) (Art UK): Landscape with the Rest on the Flight into Egypt (Art UK), Saint Jerome in a Rocky Landscape (Art UK), The Virgin and Child with a Cistercian Nun (Art UK)
- Giovanni Antonio Pellegrini (1675–1741) (Art UK): An Allegory of the Marriage of the Elector Palatine (Art UK), Rebecca at the Well (Art UK)
- Jean-Baptiste Perronneau (1715–1783) (Art UK): Jacques Cazotte (Art UK)
- Pietro Perugino (1446–1523) (Art UK): Christ Crowned with Thorns (Art UK), The Archangel Michael (Art UK), The Archangel Raphael with Tobias (Art UK), The Virgin and Child with an Angel (Art UK), The Virgin and Child with Saint John (Art UK), The Virgin and Child with Saints Dominic and Catherine of Siena, and Two Donors (Art UK)
- Francesco Pesellino (1422–1457) (Art UK): The Story of David and Goliath (Art UK), The Triumph of David (Art UK)
- Jean-François Pierre Peyron (1744–1814) (Art UK): Belisarius receiving Hospitality from a Peasant (Art UK), Cornelia, Mother of the Gracchi (Art UK)
- Callisto Piazza (c. 1500–1561/1562) (Art UK): Portrait of a Man (Art UK)
- Martino Piazza (1475/80–1523) (Art UK): Saint John the Baptist in the Desert (Art UK)
- Giovanni Battista Piazzetta (1682–1754) (Art UK): The Sacrifice of Isaac (Art UK)
- Pablo Picasso (1881–1973) (Art UK): Fruit Dish, Bottle and Violin (Art UK)
- Piero della Francesca (1410–1492) (Art UK): Saint Michael (Art UK), The Baptism of Christ (Art UK), The Rosy Wealth of June (Art UK)
- Piero di Cosimo (1462–1521) (Art UK): The Death of Procris (Art UK), The Fight between the Lapiths and the Centaurs (Art UK)
- Pinturicchio (1452–1513) (Art UK): Penelope with the Suitors (Art UK), Saint Catherine of Alexandria with a Donor (Art UK), The Virgin and Child (Art UK)
- Pisanello (1395–1455) (YP): The Virgin and Child with Saints Anthony Abbot and George (Art UK), The Vision of Saint Eustace (Art UK)
- Camille Pissarro (1830–1903) (Art UK): Fox Hill, Upper Norwood (Art UK), The Avenue, Sydenham (Art UK), The Boulevard Montmartre at Night (Art UK), The Côte des Bœufs at L’Hermitage (Art UK), The Louvre under Snow (Art UK), View from Louveciennes (Art UK)
- Giambattista Pittoni (1687–1767) (Art UK): The Nativity with God the Father and the Holy Ghost (Art UK)
- Pieter van de Plas (1595–1660) (Art UK): Portrait of a Man (Art UK)
- Egbert van der Poel (1621–1664) (Art UK): A View of Delft after the Explosion of 1654 (Art UK)
- Cornelius van Poelenburgh (1595–1667) (Art UK): A Landscape with the Judgement of Paris (Art UK), Women bathing in a Landscape (Art UK)
- Polidoro da Caravaggio (1499–1543) (Art UK): A Knight of Saint John (Art UK), The Way to Calvary (Art UK)
- Antonio del Pollaiuolo (1433–1498) (Art UK): Apollo and Daphne (Art UK), Martyrdom of Saint Sebastian (Art UK), The Rosy Wealth of June (Art UK)
- Pontormo (1494–1556) (Art UK): Joseph sold to Potiphar (Art UK), Joseph with Jacob in Egypt (Art UK), Joseph's Brothers beg for Help (Art UK), Pharaoh with his Butler and Baker (Art UK), The Madonna and Child with the Infant Baptist (Art UK)
- Willem de Poorter (1608–1649) (Art UK): An Allegorical Subject (The Just Ruler) (Art UK)
- Il Pordenone (1483–1539) (Art UK): Saint Bonaventure (Art UK), Saint Louis of Toulouse (Art UK)
- Giuseppe Porta (1520–1575) (Art UK): Justice (Art UK)
- Hendrik Gerritsz Pot (1585–1657) (Art UK): A Merry Company at Table (Art UK)
- Paulus Potter (1625–1654) (Art UK): A Landscape with Cows, Sheep and Horses by a Barn (Art UK), Cattle and Sheep in a Stormy Landscape (Art UK)
- Nicolas Poussin (1594–1665) (Art UK): A Bacchanalian Revel before a Term (Art UK), Cephalus and Aurora (Art UK), Landscape with a Man killed by a Snake (Art UK), Landscape with a Man scooping Water from a Stream (Art UK), Landscape with a Man washing his Feet at a Fountain (Art UK), Landscape with Travellers Resting (Art UK), The Adoration of the Golden Calf
- Pierre-Charles Poussin (1819–1904) (Art UK): Pardon Day in Brittany (Art UK)
- Giovanni Ambrogio de Predis (c. 1455 – after 1508) (Art UK): Profile Portrait of a Lady (Art UK)
- Gregorio Preti (1603–1672) (Art UK): Christ disputing with the Doctors (Art UK)
- Mattia Preti (1613–1699) (Art UK): The Marriage at Cana (Art UK)
- Andrea Previtali (1480–1528) (Art UK): Christ Blessing (Art UK), Salvator Mundi (Art UK), Scenes from Tebaldeo's Eclogues: Damon broods on his unrequited love (Art UK), Scenes from Tebaldeo's Eclogues: Thyrsis asks Damon (Art UK), The Virgin and Child adored by Two Angels (Art UK), The Virgin and Child with a Shoot of Olive (Art UK)
- Jan Provoost (1462–1529) (Art UK): The Virgin and Child in a Landscape (Art UK)
- Scipione Pulzone (1544–1598) (Art UK): Portrait of a Cardinal (Art UK)
- Pierre Puvis de Chavannes (1824–1898) (Art UK): A Maid combing a Woman's Hair (Art UK), Death and the Maidens (Art UK), Summer (Art UK), The Beheading of Saint John the Baptist (Art UK)
- Jacob Pynas (1592–1650) (Art UK): Mountain Landscape with Narcissus (Art UK)

== Q ==
- Pieter Quast (1606–1647) (Art UK): A Man and a Woman in a Stableyard (Art UK), A Standing Man (Art UK)

== R ==
- Henry Raeburn (1756–1823) (Art UK): Robert Ferguson of Raith 1770–1840 and Lieutenant-General Sir Ronald Ferguson 1773–1841 ("The Archers") (Art UK)
- Raffaellino del Garbo (1470–1524) (Art UK): Portrait of a Man (Art UK), The Virgin and Child with the Magdalen and Saint Catherine of Alexandria (Art UK), The Virgin and Child with Two Angels (Art UK)
- Abraham Ragueneau (1623–1690) (Art UK): Portrait of a Young Man in Grey (Art UK)
- Raphael (1483–1520) (Art UK): Ansidei Madonna (Art UK), Garvagh Madonna (Art UK), Mackintosh Madonna (Art UK), Madonna of the Pinks (Art UK), Mond Crucifixion (Art UK), Portrait of Pope Julius II (Art UK), The Procession to Calvary (Art UK), Saint Catherine of Alexandria (Art UK), Saint John the Baptist Preaching (Art UK), Vision of a Knight (Art UK)
  - After Raphael: Madonna and Child (after the Bridgewater Madonna) (Art UK)
  - Imitator of Raphael: Portrait of a Young Man (Art UK)
- Rembrandt (1606–1669) (Art UK): A Bearded Man in a Cap (Art UK), A Franciscan Friar (Art UK), A Man seated reading at a Table in a Lofty Room (Art UK), A Seated Man with a Stick (Art UK), A Study of an Elderly Man in a Cap (Art UK), A Woman Bathing in a Stream (Art UK), The Woman Taken in Adultery
- Pierre-Auguste Renoir (1841–1919) (Art UK): A Bather (Art UK), A Nymph by a Stream (Art UK), At the Theatre (La Première Sortie) (Art UK), Dancing Girl with Castanets (Art UK), Dancing Girl with Tambourine (Art UK), Lakeside Landscape (Art UK)
- Gabriel Revel (1643–1712) (Art UK): Portrait of an Astronomer (Art UK)
- Marinus van Reymerswaele (1490–1546) (Art UK): Two Tax Gatherers (Art UK)
- Joshua Reynolds (1723–1792) (Art UK): Anne, 2nd Countess of Albemarle (Art UK), Captain Robert Orme (Art UK), Lieutenant-Colonel Banastre Tarleton (Art UK), Lady Cockburn and Her Three Eldest Sons (Art UK), Lord Heathfield of Gibraltar (Art UK)
- Guido Reni (1575–1642) (Art UK): Christ embracing Saint John the Baptist (Art UK), Head of Christ Crowned with Thorns (Art UK), Lot and his Daughters leaving Sodom (Art UK), Perseus and Andromeda (Art UK), Saint Jerome (Art UK), Saint Mary Magdalene (Art UK)
- Francisco Ribalta (1565–1628) (Art UK): The Vision of Father Simón (Art UK)
- Jusepe de Ribera (1590–1656) (Art UK): An Apostle (Art UK), Jacob with the Flock of Laban (Art UK), The Lamentation over the Dead Christ (Art UK)
- Louis Gustave Ricard (1823–1873) (Art UK): Portrait of a Man (Art UK), The Countess of Desart as a Child (Art UK)
- Sebastiano Ricci (1659–1734) (Art UK): Bacchus and Ariadne (Art UK), Esther before Ahasuerus (Art UK)
- Hyacinthe Rigaud (1659–1743) (Art UK): Antoine Pâris (Art UK), Cardinal Fleury (Art UK)
- Ercole de' Roberti (1450–1469) (Art UK): The Adoration of the Shepherds (Art UK), The Dead Christ (Art UK), The Institution of the Eucharist (Art UK), The Israelites gathering Manna (Art UK)
- Roelant Roghman (1627–1692) (Art UK): A Mountainous Landscape (Art UK)
- Girolamo Romani (c. 1484 – c. 1560) (Art UK): Pegasus and the Muses (Art UK), Saint Alexander (Art UK), Saint Filippo Benizzi (Art UK), Saint Gaudioso (Art UK), Saint Jerome (Art UK), The Nativity (Art UK)
- Johann Heinrich Roos (1631–1685) (Art UK): Still Life of Fruit and Vegetables with Two Monkeys (Art UK)
- Salvator Rosa (1615–1673) (Art UK): A Coastal Scene (Art UK), An Angel appears to Hagar and Ishmael in the Desert (Art UK), Landscape with Mercury and the Dishonest Woodman (Art UK), Landscape with Tobias and the Angel (Art UK), Mountainous Landscape with Figures (Art UK), Philosophy (Art UK)
- Alexander Roslin (1718–1793) (Art UK): The Dauphin, Louis de France (Art UK)
- Rosso Fiorentino (1494–1541) (Art UK): Portrait of a Young Man holding a Letter (Art UK)
- Hans Rottenhammer (1564–1625) (Art UK): The Coronation of the Virgin (Art UK)
- Henri Rousseau (1844–1910) (Art UK): Tiger in a Tropical Storm (Art UK)
- Philippe Rousseau (1816–1887) (Art UK): A Valley (Art UK), Still Life with Oysters (Art UK), The Fish Market (Art UK)
- Théodore Rousseau (1812–1867) (Art UK): A Rocky Landscape (Art UK), Landscape (Art UK), Moonlight: The bathers (Art UK), River Scene (Art UK), Sunset in the Auvergne (Art UK), The Valley of Saint-Vincent (Art UK)
- Peter Paul Rubens (1577–1640) (Art UK): A Landscape with a Shepherd and his Flock (Art UK), A Lion Hunt (Art UK), A Roman Triumph (Art UK), A Shepherd with his Flock in a Woody Landscape (Art UK), A Wagon fording a Stream (Art UK), An Allegory showing the Effects of War ("The Horrors of War") (Art UK)
- Jacob Isaacksz van Ruisdael (1628–1682) (Art UK): A Bleaching Ground in a Hollow by a Cottage (Art UK), A Castle on a Hill by a River (Art UK), A Cottage and a Hayrick by a River (Art UK), A Landscape with a Ruined Building at the Foot of a Hill by a River (Art UK), A Landscape with a Ruined Castle and a Church (Art UK), A Landscape with a Waterfall and a Castle on a Hill (Art UK)
- Jacob Salomonsz van Ruysdael (1629–1681) (Art UK): A Waterfall by a Cottage in a Hilly Landscape (Art UK)
- Salomon van Ruysdael (1602–1670) (Art UK): A Landscape with a Carriage and Horsemen at a Pool (Art UK), A River Landscape with Fishermen (Art UK), A River with Fishermen drawing a Net (Art UK), A View of Deventer seen from the North-West (Art UK), A View of Rhenen seen from the West (Art UK), River Scene (Art UK)
- Rachel Ruysch (1664–1750) (Art UK): Flowers in a Vase (Art UK)
- Marten Ryckaert (1587–1631) (Art UK): Landscape with Satyrs (Art UK)
- Théo van Rysselberghe (1862–1926) (Art UK): Coastal Scene (Art UK)

== S ==
- Andrea Sacchi (1599–1661) (Art UK): Saints Anthony Abbot and Francis of Assisi (Art UK)
- Pier Francesco Sacchi (c. 1485–1528) (Art UK): Saint Paul Writing (Art UK)
- Pieter Jansz. Saenredam (1597–1665) (Art UK): The Interior of the Buurkerk at Utrecht (Art UK), The Interior of the Grote Kerk at Haarlem (Art UK)
- Herman Saftleven the younger (1609–1685) (Art UK): Christ teaching from Saint Peter's Boat on the Lake of Gennesaret (Art UK)
- Gabriel-Jacques Saint-Aubin (1724–1780) (Art UK): A Street Show in Paris (Art UK)
- Lorenzo d'Alessandro da Sanseverino (1440/1450–1503) (Art UK): The Marriage of Saint Catherine of Siena (Art UK)
- Girolamo da Santacroce (1492–1537) (YP): A Saint with a Fortress and a Banner (Art UK), A Youthful Saint Reading (Art UK)
- Giovanni Santi (c. 1435–1494) (Art UK): The Virgin and Child (Art UK)
- Dirck van Santvoort (1610–1680) (Art UK): Portrait of Geertruyt Spiegel with a Finch (Art UK)
- Philip Santvoort (1688–1708) (Art UK): The Rape of Tamar by Amnon (Art UK)
- Carlo Saraceni (1579–1620) (Art UK): Moses defending the Daughters of Jethro (Art UK)
- John Singer Sargent (1856–1925) (Art UK): Lord Ribblesdale (Art UK), Wineglasses (Art UK)
- Andrea del Sarto (1486–1530) (Art UK): Portrait of a Young Man (Art UK), The Madonna and Child with Saint Elizabeth and Saint John the Baptist (Art UK)
- Giovanni Battista Salvi da Sassoferrato (1609–1685) (Art UK): The Baptism of Christ (Art UK), The Virgin and Child Embracing (Art UK), The Virgin in Prayer (Art UK)
- Roelant Savery (1576–1639) (Art UK): Orpheus (Art UK)
- Girolamo Savoldo (c. 1480 – c. 1548) (Art UK): Mary Magdalene (Art UK), Saint Jerome (Art UK)
- Vittore Carpaccio (1465–1527) (Art UK): The Departure of Ceyx (Art UK)
- Cornelis Symonsz van der Schalcke (1617–1671) (Art UK): An Extensive River Landscape, with Two Sportsmen and their Greyhounds (Art UK)
- Godfried Schalcken (1643–1706) (Art UK): A Candlelight Scene: A man offering a gold chain and coins (Art UK), A Woman singing and a Man with a Cittern (Art UK), Allegory of Virtue and Riches (Art UK), An Old Woman scouring a Pot (Art UK)
- Ary Scheffer (1795–1858) (Art UK): Mrs Robert Hollond (Art UK), Saints Augustine and Monica (Art UK)
- Giorgio Schiavone (1436/1437–1504) (Art UK): A Female Saint (Art UK), Saint Anthony of Padua (Art UK), Saint Bernardino (Art UK), Saint Catherine (Art UK), Saint Jerome (Art UK), Saint John the Baptist (Art UK)
- Andrea Schiavone (c. 1510–1563) (Art UK): Arcas Hunting (Art UK), Jupiter seducing Callisto (Art UK)
- Julius Schnorr Von Carolsfeld (1794–1872) (Art UK): Ruth in Boaz's Field (Art UK)
- Otto Scholderer (1834–1902) (Art UK): Lilac (Art UK), Portrait of the Artist's Wife (Art UK)
- Martin Schongauer (1440–1491) (Art UK): The Virgin and Child in a Garden (Art UK)
- Heinrich Wilhelm Schweickhardt (1747–1797) (Art UK): Cattle (Art UK)
- Jan van Scorel (1495–1562) (Art UK): A Man with a Pansy and a Skull (Art UK)
- Hercules Seghers (1589–1638) (YP): A Mountainous Landscape (Art UK)
- Segna di Bonaventura (documented 1298 – c. 1331) (Art UK): Crucifix (Art UK)
- Jakob Seisenegger (1504/05–1567) (Art UK): Portrait of a Girl (Art UK)
- Georges Seurat (1859–1891) (Art UK): Bathers at Asnières (Art UK), Bathers at Asnières (Art UK), Study for Bathers at Asnières (Art UK), Study for La Grande Jatte (Art UK), Study for La Grande Jatte (Art UK), The Channel of Gravelines, Grand Fort-Philippe (Art UK)
- Martin Archer Shee (1769–1850) (Art UK): Mr Lewis as the Marquis in 'The Midnight Hour' (Art UK)
- Jan Siberechts (1627–1703) (Art UK): A Cowherd passing a Horse and Cart in a Stream (Art UK)
- Luca Signorelli (1441–1523) (Art UK): Coriolanus persuaded by his Family to spare Rome (Art UK), Esther before Ahasuerus, and Three Episodes from the Life of Saint Jerome (Art UK), The Adoration of the Shepherds (Art UK), The Adoration of the Shepherds (Art UK), The Circumcision (Art UK), The Holy Family (Art UK)
- Telemaco Signorini (1835–1901) (Art UK): Sketch for 'Straw Weavers at Settignano' (Art UK)
- Francesco Simonini (1686 – c. 1755) (Art UK): A Campaign Scene (Art UK)
- Alfred Sisley (1839–1899) (Art UK): The Watering Place at Marly-le-Roi (Art UK)
- Pieter Snyers (1681–1752) (Art UK): A Still Life with Fruit, Vegetables, Dead Chickens and a Lobster (Art UK)
- Il Sodoma (1477–1549) (Art UK): Head of Christ (Art UK), Saint Jerome in Penitence (Art UK), The Madonna and Child (Art UK), The Madonna and Child with Saints Peter and Catherine of Siena and a Carthusian Donor (Art UK), The Nativity with the Infant Baptist and Shepherds (Art UK)
- Giovanni Antonio Sogliani (1492–1544) (Art UK): The Madonna and Child (Art UK)
- Andrea Solari (c. 1465–1524) (Art UK): A Man with a Pink (Art UK), Giovanni Cristoforo Longoni (Art UK), The Virgin and Child (Art UK)
- Antonio Solario (1502–1514) (Art UK): Saint Catherine of Alexandria (Art UK), Saint Ursula (Art UK), The Virgin and Child with Saint John (Art UK)
- Francesco Solimena (1657–1743) (Art UK): An Allegory of Louis XIV (Art UK), Dido receiving Aeneas and Cupid disguised as Ascanius (Art UK)
- Lo Spagna (died 1529) (Art UK): Christ at Gethsemane (Art UK), The Agony in the Garden (Art UK)
- Giovanni Martino Spanzotti (1456–1526) (Art UK): Saint Peter Martyr and a Bishop Saint (probably Saint Evasio) (Art UK), Saints Nicholas of Tolentino and John the Baptist (Art UK)
- Giovanni Battista Spinelli (active from c. 1630 – c. 1660) (Art UK): The Adoration of the Shepherds (Art UK)
- Bartholomeus Spranger (1546–1611) (Art UK): The Adoration of the Kings (Art UK)
- Johannes Spruyt (1627–1671) (Art UK): Geese and Ducks (Art UK)
- Gherardo Starnina (1354–1409) (Art UK): The Beheading of Saint Margaret (Art UK)
- Jan Steen (1626–1679) (Art UK): A Man blowing Smoke at a Drunken Woman, Another Man with a Wine-pot (Art UK), A Peasant Family at Meal-time ("Grace before Meat") (Art UK), A Pedlar selling Spectacles outside a Cottage (Art UK), A Young Woman playing a Harpsichord to a Young Man (Art UK), An Interior with a Man offering an Oyster to a Woman (Art UK), An Itinerant Musician saluting Two Women in a Kitchen (Art UK)
- Harmen Steenwijck (1612–1656) (Art UK): Still Life: An Allegory of the Vanities of Human Life
- Hendrik van Steenwijk II (1580–1649) (Art UK): The Interior of a Gothic Church looking East (Art UK), A Man kneels before a Woman in the Courtyard of a Renaissance Palace (Art UK), Croesus and Solon (Art UK), Interior of a Church at Night (Art UK), The Interior of a Gothic Church looking East (Art UK), The Interior of a Gothic Church looking East (Art UK)
- Stefano di Giovanni (1374–1451) (Art UK): Saint Francis before the Pope: the Granting of the Indulgence (Art UK), Saint Francis before the Sultan (Art UK), Saint Francis meets a Knight Poorer than Himself and Saint Francis's Vision of the Founding of the Franciscan Order (Art UK), Saint Francis renounces his Earthly Father (Art UK), The Funeral of Saint Francis and Verification of the Stigmata (Art UK), The Stigmatisation of Saint Francis (Art UK)
- Alfred Stevens (1823–1906 ) (Art UK): Storm at Honfleur (Art UK)
- Abraham Storck (1644–1708) (Art UK): A River View (Art UK)
- Bernardo Strozzi (1581–1644) (Art UK): A Personification of Fame (Art UK)
- Zanobi Strozzi (1412–1468) (Art UK): The Abduction of Helen (Art UK), The Adoration of the Magi (Art UK), The Annunciation (Art UK)
- George Stubbs (1724–1806) (Art UK): A Gentleman driving a Lady in a Phaeton (Art UK), Sir Peniston and Lady Lamb, Later Lord and Lady Melbourne, with Lady Lamb's Father, Sir Ralph Milbanke, and Her Brother John Milbanke ("The Milbanke and Melbourne Families") (Art UK), Whistlejacket (Art UK)
- Pierre Subleyras (1699–1749) (Art UK): Diana and Endymion (Art UK), The Barque of Charon (Art UK)
- Justus Sustermans (1597–1681) (Art UK): Double Portrait of the Grand Duke Ferdinand II of Tuscany and his Wife Vittoria della Rovere (Art UK), Portrait of a Man (Art UK)
- Lambert Sustris (1515–1591) (Art UK): The Queen of Sheba before King Solomon (Art UK)

== T ==
- Francesco Tacconi (active 1464–1490) (Art UK): The Virgin and Child (Art UK)
- Jean-Joseph Taillasson (1745–1809) (Art UK): Virgil reading the Aeneid to Augustus and Octavia (Art UK)
- David Teniers the Younger (1610–1690) (Art UK): A Cottage by a River with a Distant View of a Castle (Art UK), A Country Festival near Antwerp (Art UK), A Doctor tending a Patient's Foot in his Surgery (Art UK), A Gipsy telling a Peasant his Fortune in a Hilly Landscape (Art UK), A Man holding a Glass and an Old Woman lighting a Pipe (Art UK), A View of a Village with Three Peasants talking in the Foreground (Art UK)
- Giovanni Battista Tiepolo (1696–1770) (Art UK): A Vision of the Trinity appearing to Pope Saint Clement (Art UK), An Allegory with Venus and Time (Art UK), Rinaldo turning in Shame from the Magic Shield (Art UK), Saints Augustine, Louis of France, John the Evangelist and a Bishop Saint (Art UK), Saints Maximus and Oswald (Art UK), Seated Man, Woman with Jar, and Boy (Art UK)
- Giovanni Domenico Tiepolo (1727–1804) (Art UK): The Building of the Trojan Horse (Art UK), The Lamentation at the Foot of the Cross (Art UK), The Lamentation at the Foot of the Cross (Art UK), The Marriage of Frederick Barbarossa and Beatrice of Burgundy (Art UK), The Procession of the Trojan Horse into Troy (Art UK)
- Tintoretto (1518–1594) (Art UK): Christ Washing the Disciples' Feet (Art UK), Jupiter and Semele (Art UK), Portrait of Vincenzo Morosini (Art UK), Saint George and the Dragon (Art UK), The Miracle of Saint Mark (Art UK), The Nativity (Art UK), The Origin of the Milky Way
- Domenico Tintoretto (1560–1635) (Art UK): Portrait of a Gentleman (Art UK)
- Titian (1485–1576) (Art UK): A Boy with a Bird (Art UK), A Concert (Art UK), A Man with a Quilted Sleeve (Art UK), Allegory of Prudence (Art UK), Bacchus and Ariadne (Art UK), Diana and Actaeon (Art UK), Noli me tangere
- Louis Tocqué (1696–1772) (Art UK): Jean Michel de Grilleau (Art UK), Portrait of a Man (Art UK), Portrait of Mademoiselle de Coislin (Art UK)
- Michele Tosini (1503–1577) (Art UK): Charity (Art UK)
- Henri de Toulouse-Lautrec (1864–1901) (Art UK): Woman seated in a Garden (Art UK)
- Jan Jansz. Treck (1605–1652) (Art UK): Still Life with a Pewter Flagon and Two Ming Bowls (Art UK), Vanitas Still Life (Art UK)
- Jean François de Troy (1679–1752) (Art UK): Jason swearing Eternal Affection to Medea (Art UK), The Capture of the Golden Fleece (Art UK), The Game of Pied de Bœuf (Art UK), Time unveiling Truth (Art UK)
- Charles-Philogène Tschaggeny (1815–1894) (Art UK): An Episode on the Field of Battle (Art UK)
- Cosmè Tura (c. 1430–1495) (Art UK): A Muse (Calliope) (Art UK), Saint Jerome (Art UK), The Virgin and Child Enthroned (Art UK), The Virgin Annunciate (Art UK)
- J. M. W. Turner (1775–1851) (Art UK): Calais Pier, with French Poissards preparing for Sea: an English Packet arriving (Art UK), Dido building Carthage (Art UK), Margate, from the Sea (Art UK), Rain, Steam and Speed – The Great Western Railway (Art UK), Sun rising through vapour with fishermen (Art UK), The Evening Star (Art UK)

== U ==
- Paolo Uccello (1396–1475) (Art UK): The Battle of San Romano (Art UK), Saint George and the Dragon (Art UK)
- Ugolino di Nerio (1295–1347) (Art UK): David (Art UK), Isaiah (Art UK), Moses (Art UK), Saint Bartholomew and Saint Andrew (Art UK), Saint Simon and Saint Thaddeus (Jude) (Art UK), The Betrayal of Christ (Art UK)
- Moses van Uyttenbroeck (1590–1648) (Art UK): Landscape with Mythological Figures (Art UK)

== V ==
- Wallerant Vaillant (1623–1677) (Art UK): A Boy seated Drawing (Art UK)
- Valentin de Boulogne (1591–1632) (Art UK): The Four Ages of Man (Art UK)
- Jacques Antoine Vallin (c. 1760 – after 1831) (Art UK): Dr Forlenze (Art UK)
- Vincent van Gogh (1853–1890) (Art UK): Wheat Field with Cypresses (Art UK), Long Grass with Butterflies (Art UK), Sunflowers (Art UK), Van Gogh's Chair (Art UK)
- Diego Velázquez (1599–1660) (Art UK): Christ after the Flagellation contemplated by the Christian Soul (Art UK), Christ in the House of Martha and Mary (Art UK), Philip IV hunting Wild Boar (La Tela Real) (Art UK), Philip IV of Spain (Art UK), Philip IV in Brown and Silver (Art UK), Portrait of Archbishop Fernando de Valdés (Art UK)
- Adriaen van de Velde (1636–1672) (Art UK): A Bay Horse, a Cow, a Goat and Three Sheep near a Building (Art UK), A Farm with a Dead Tree (Art UK), A Goat and a Kid (Art UK), A Landscape with a Farm by a Stream (Art UK), Golfers on the Ice near Haarlem (Art UK), Peasants with Cattle fording a Stream (Art UK)
- Esaias van de Velde (1587–1630) (Art UK): A Winter Landscape (Art UK)
- Willem van de Velde the Younger (1633–1707) (Art UK): A Dutch Ship, a Yacht and Smaller Vessels in a Breeze (Art UK), A Dutch Ship and Other Small Vessels in a Strong Breeze (Art UK), A Dutch Vessel in a Strong Breeze (Art UK), A Dutch Yacht surrounded by Many Small Vessels, saluting as Two Barges pull alongside (Art UK), A Small Dutch Vessel close-hauled in a Strong Breeze (Art UK), An English Vessel and Dutch Ships Becalmed (Art UK)
- Jan Jansz van de Velde (1620–1662) (Art UK): Still Life: A goblet of wine, oysters and lemons (Art UK)
- Jacob Jansz van Velsen (1597–1656) (Art UK): A Musical Party (Art UK)
- Antonio da Vendri (1476–1555) (Art UK): The Giusti Family of Verona (Art UK)
- Marcello Venusti (c. 1512–1579 ) (Art UK): The Holy Family (Il Silenzio) (Art UK), The Purification of the Temple (Art UK)
- Pieter Cornelisz Verbeeck (1610–1654) (Art UK): A White Horse standing by a Sleeping Man (Art UK)
- Johannes Vermeer (1632–1675) (Art UK): Lady Seated at a Virginal (Art UK), Lady Standing at a Virginal (Art UK)
- Andries Vermeulen (1763–1814) (Art UK): A Scene on the Ice (Art UK)
- Jan Cornelisz Vermeyen (1500–1559) (Art UK): A Man holding a Coloured Medal (Art UK)
- Claude Joseph Vernet (1714–1789) (Art UK): A Landscape at Sunset with Fishermen returning with their Catch (Art UK), A River with Fishermen (Art UK), A Sea-Shore (Art UK), A Seaport (Art UK), A Shipwreck in Stormy Seas (Art UK), 'A Sporting Contest on the Tiber' (Art UK)
- Horace Vernet (1789–1863) (Art UK): The Battle of Hanau (Art UK), The Battle of Jemappes (Art UK), The Battle of Montmirail (Art UK), The Battle of Valmy (Art UK), The Emperor Napoleon I (Art UK)
- Bonifazio Veronese (1487–1553) (Art UK): A Huntsman (Art UK), Dives and Lazarus (Art UK), The Madonna and Child with Saints James the Greater, Jerome, the Infant Baptist and Catherine of Alexandria (Art UK), The Madonna and Child with Saints John the Baptist, Elizabeth and Catherine of Alexandria (Art UK)
- Paolo Veronese (1528–1588) (Art UK): The Allegory of Love (Infidelity (Art UK), Respect (Art UK), Scorn (Art UK) and Happy Union (Art UK)), Adoration of the Magi (Art UK), The Consecration of Saint Nicholas (Art UK), The Conversion of Mary Magdalene (Art UK)
- Andrea del Verrocchio (1435–1488) (Art UK): Madonna of the Milk (Art UK), Tobias and the Angel (Art UK)
- Hendrik Verschuring (1627–1690) (Art UK): Cavalry attacking a Fortified Place (Art UK)
- Gerolamo da Vicenza (active 1488) (Art UK): The Dormition and Assumption of the Virgin (Art UK)
- Jan Victors (1619–1676) (Art UK): A Village Scene with a Cobbler (Art UK)
- Louise Élisabeth Vigée Le Brun (1755–1842) (YP): Mademoiselle Brongniart (Art UK), Self-Portrait in a Straw Hat (Art UK)
- Sebastiano del Piombo (1485–1547) (Art UK): Portrait of a Lady with the Attributes of Saint Agatha (Art UK), The Daughter of Herodias (Art UK), The Madonna and Child with Saint Joseph, Saint John the Baptist and a Donor (Art UK), The Raising of Lazarus (Art UK)
- Giovanni Battista Viola (1576–1622 ) (Art UK): Landscape with a Hunting Party (Art UK), Landscape with a River and Boats (Art UK)
- Bartolomeo Vivarini (1432–1499) (YP): Portrait of a Man (Art UK), The Virgin and Child with Saints Paul and Jerome (Art UK)
- Alvise Vivarini (1445–1503) (Art UK): The Virgin and Child (Art UK)
- Antonio Vivarini (1415–1476) (Art UK): Saints Francis and Mark (Art UK), Saints Peter and Jerome (Art UK)
- Simon de Vlieger (1600–1653) (Art UK): A Dutch Man-of-war and Various Vessels in a Breeze (Art UK), A View of an Estuary, with Dutch Vessels at a Jetty and a Dutch Man-of-War at Anchor (Art UK)
- Willem van der Vliet (1584–1642) (Art UK): Portrait of Suitbertus Purmerent (Art UK)
- Jacob Ferdinand Voet (1639–1689) (Art UK): Cardinal Carlo Cerri (Art UK), Cardinal de Retz (Art UK)
- Simon de Vos (1603–1676) (Art UK): The Raising of Lazarus (Art UK)
- Simon Vouet (1590–1649) (Art UK): Ceres and Harvesting Cupids (Art UK)
- Roelof Jansz van Vries (1630–1690) (Art UK): A View of a Village (Art UK)
- Cornelis Vroom (1591–1661) (Art UK): A Landscape with a River by a Wood (Art UK)
- Édouard Vuillard (1868–1940) (YP): Madame André Wormser and her Children (Art UK), The Mantelpiece (La Cheminée) (Art UK), The Terrace at Vasouy, the Garden (Art UK), The Terrace at Vasouy, the Lunch (Art UK)

== W ==
- Jacob van Walscapelle (1644–1727) (Art UK): Flowers in a Glass Vase (Art UK)
- Antoine Watteau (1684–1721) (Art UK): Perfect Harmony (Art UK), The Scale of Love (Art UK)
- Jan Baptist Weenix (1621–1661) (Art UK): A Huntsman cutting up a Dead Deer, with Two Deerhounds (Art UK)
- Jan Weenix (1640–1719) (Art UK): A Deerhound with Dead Game and Implements of the Chase (Art UK), An Italian Courtyard (Art UK)
- Jacob Weier (died 1670) (Art UK): Cavalry attacked by Infantry (Art UK)
- Adriaen van der Werff (1659–1722) (Art UK): A Boy with a Mousetrap (Art UK), Portrait of a Man in a Quilted Gown (Art UK), The Rest on the Flight into Egypt (Art UK)
- Hans Wertinger (c. 1465–1533) (Art UK): Summer (Art UK)
- Jacob Willemszoon de Wet (1610–1675) (Art UK): A Landscape with a River at the Foot of a Hill (Art UK)
- Rogier van der Weyden (1400–1464) (Art UK): A Man Reading (Art UK), Christ appearing to the Virgin (Art UK), Pietà (Art UK), Portrait of a Lady (Art UK), The Exhumation of Saint Hubert (Art UK), The Magdalen Reading (Art UK)
- Jan Wijnants (1632–1684) (Art UK): A Landscape with a Dead Tree, and a Peasant driving Oxen and Sheep along a Road (Art UK), A Landscape with a High Dune and Peasants on a Road (Art UK), A Landscape with a Woman driving Sheep through a Ruined Archway (Art UK), A Landscape with Two Dead Trees, and Two Sportsmen with Dogs on a Sandy Road (Art UK), A Track by a Dune, with Peasants and a Horseman (Art UK), Peasants driving Cattle and Sheep by a Sandhill, and Two Sportsmen with Dogs (Art UK)
- Richard Wilson (1713/1714–1782 ) (Art UK): Holt Bridge on the River Dee (Art UK), The Valley of the Dee, with Chester in the Distance (Art UK)
- Emanuel de Witte (1617–1692) (Art UK): Adriana van Heusden and her Daughter at the New Fishmarket in Amsterdam (Art UK), The Interior of the Oude Kerk, Amsterdam, during a Sermon (Art UK), The Interior of the Oude Kerk, Amsterdam, during a Sermon (Art UK)
- Frans Wouters (1612–1659) (Art UK): Nymphs surprised by Satyrs (Art UK)
- Philips Wouwerman (1619–1668) (Art UK): A Dune Landscape with a River and Many Figures (Art UK), A Horse being Shod outside a Village Smithy (Art UK), A Stag Hunt (Art UK), A Stream in the Dunes, with Two Bathers (Art UK), A View on a Seashore with Fishwives offering Fish to a Horseman (Art UK), A White Horse, and an Old Man binding Faggots (Art UK)
- Jan Wouwerman (1629–1666) (Art UK): A Landscape with a Farm on the Bank of a River (Art UK)
- Joseph Wright of Derby (1734–1797) (Art UK): An Experiment on a Bird in the Air Pump (Art UK), Mr and Mrs Thomas Coltman (Art UK)
- Joachim Wtewael (1566–1638) (Art UK): The Judgement of Paris (Art UK)

== Z ==
- Bernardino Zaganelli (1465–1511) (Art UK): Saint Sebastian (Art UK)
- Francesco da Cotignola (1475–1531) (Art UK): The Baptism of Christ (Art UK), The Dead Christ with Angels (Art UK)
- Giuseppe Zais (1709–1781) (Art UK): Landscape with a Group of Figures (Art UK), Landscape with a Group of Figures Fishing (Art UK), Landscape with a Ruined Tower (Art UK)
- Johann Zoffany (1733–1810) (Art UK): Mrs Oswald (Art UK)
- Marco Zoppo (1433–1478) (Art UK): A Bishop Saint, perhaps Saint Augustine (Art UK), The Dead Christ supported by Saints (Art UK)
- Francesco Zuccarelli (1702–1788) (Art UK): Landscape with Cattle and Figures (Art UK)
- Francesco Zugno (1709–1787) (Art UK): The Finding of Moses (Art UK)
- Francisco de Zurbarán (1598–1664) (Art UK): A Cup of Water and a Rose (Art UK), Saint Francis in Meditation (Art UK), Saint Francis in Meditation (Art UK), Saint Margaret of Antioch (Art UK)

== See also ==
- For European paintings from the 14th to the 20th century, see the 1981 highlights catalogue 100 great paintings from Duccio to Picasso, by curator Dillian Gordon
