= Jan Lagoor =

Dutch Golden Age painter

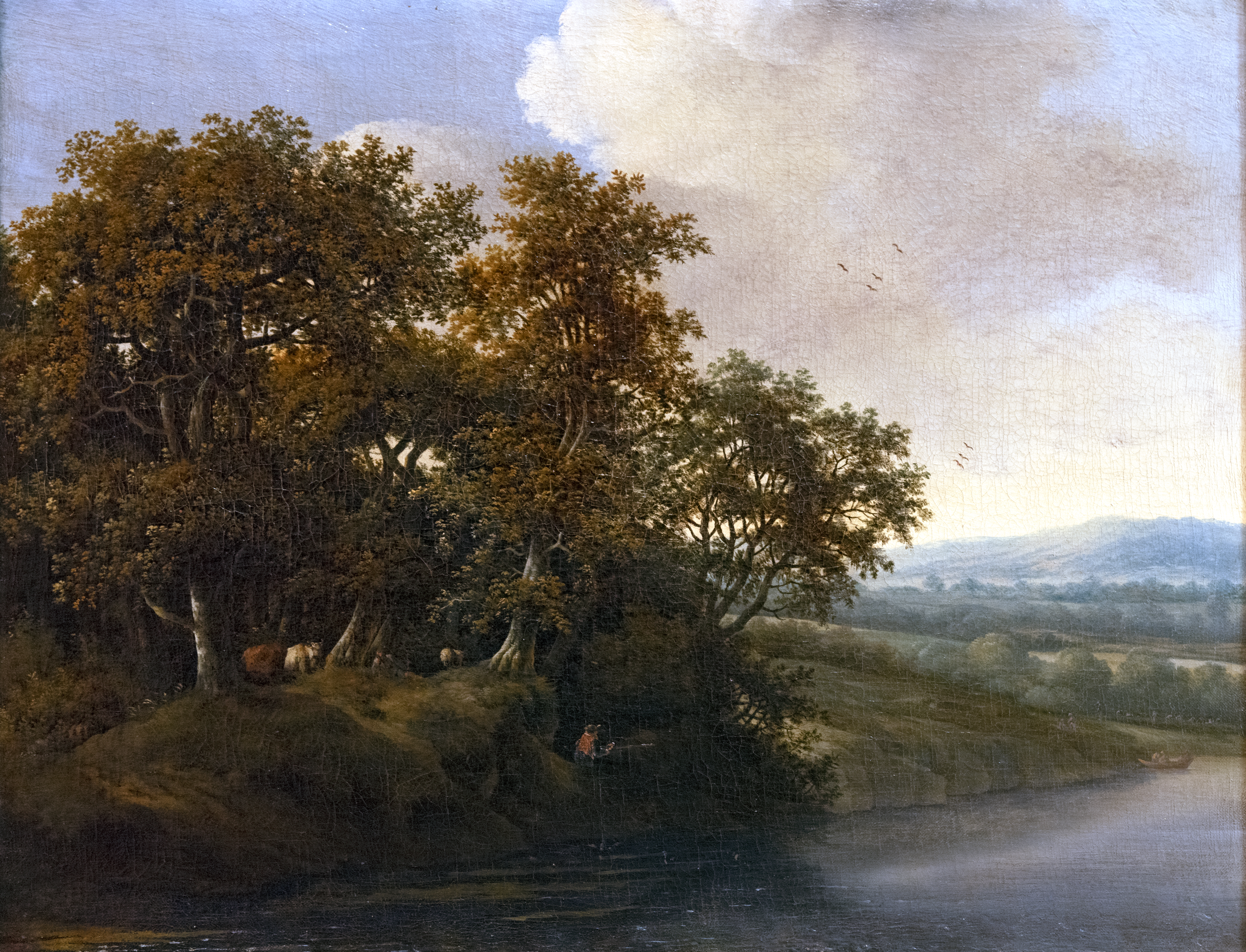
Landscape with a boatsman at a river's edge

Johan, or Jan (De) Lagoor (1620–1660), was a Dutch Golden Age painter.

== Biography ==
According to his marriage record, Lagoor was born in Gorinchem and moved to Haarlem by 1645 where he married Francina Dwingeloo. Francina was the daughter of the Leiden clergyman Bernardus Dwingeloo, who later lived on the River Spaarne near the brewery den Hollandtschen Thuyn and was buried in the Grote Kerk in 1652, where he is explicitly identified as Lagoor’s father-in-law. He became a member of the Haarlem Guild of St. Luke.

In 1649 he was a vinder of the guild and during the years 1645-1651 he was a member of the Haarlem schutterij. Archival documents further reveal him as an active participant in the city’s social and legal affairs. In 1651 he purchased a house on the Spaarnwouderstraat, known by the sign the three flax flowers, and shortly thereafter mortgaged the property. He appears frequently in legal and notarial records, acting as executor of wills and as surety in financial transactions, indicating a degree of social standing and trust. In 1653 he moved to Amsterdam where his daughter was baptized in 1658. In July 1659 Lagoor served as baptismal witness to the daughter of Allaert van Everdingen, suggesting close ties within Haarlem’s artistic circles.
