= Master of Riglos =

Spanish Gothic painter

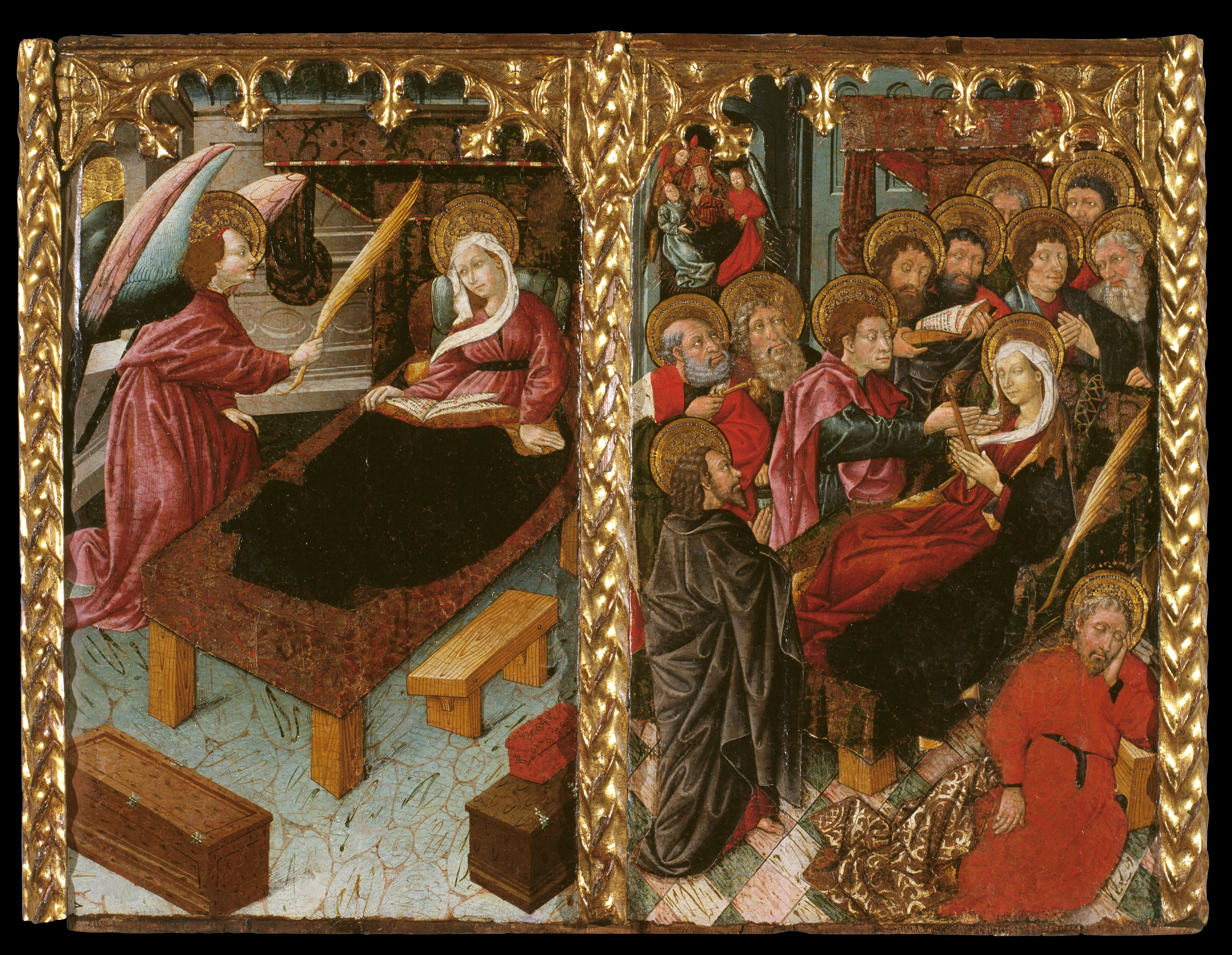
Annunciation of the Death and Dormition of the Virgin

Master of Riglos (died circa 1460), was a Spanish Gothic painter.

== Biography ==
He was active in Aragon during the years 1435–1460. He is known for religious works.
