= Francesco Tacconi =

Italian painter

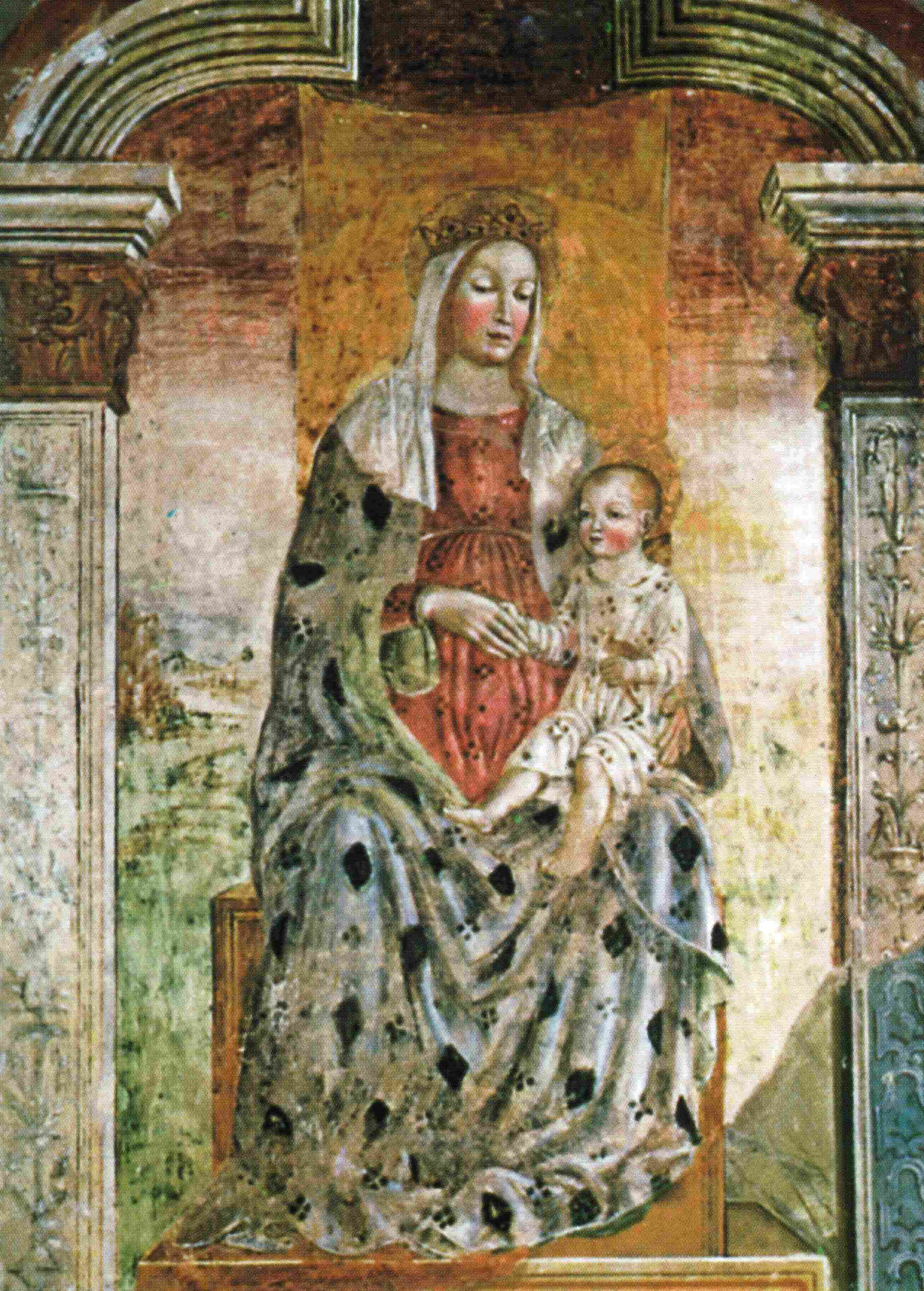
Madonna and Child fresco, circa 1480, Badia di Santa Maria della Neve

Francesco Tacconi (fl. 1464 – 1490) was an Italian painter of the Renaissance period, active in Cremona in the 15th century. He and his brother, Filippo Tacconi, executed several frescoes in a loggia in the Palazzo Pubblico of their native city. In 1464 their fellow-citizens exempted them from all taxes on account of these frescoes, which have since, however, been whitewashed over. In 1460, Francesco was employed in St Mark's Basilica in Venice, where he painted, on the organ doors then in use, with Epiphany, Resurrection, and Assumption. These paintings, though much damaged, are still preserved, and are said once to have been signed and dated.
