= Jacob Weyer =

German painter

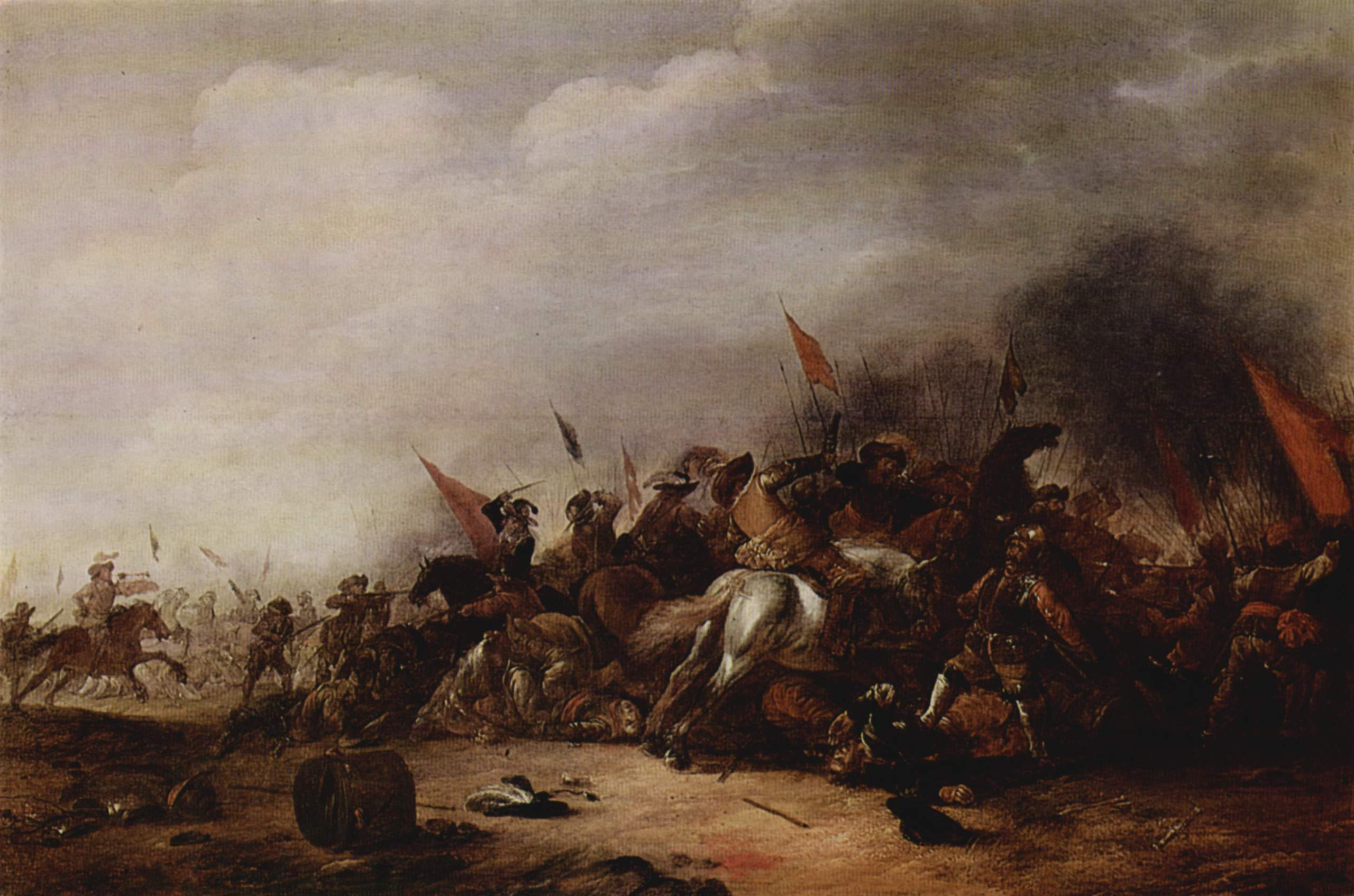
An unspecified battle, probably from the Thirty Years' War

Jacob Weyer, or Weier (1623–1670), was a 17th-century German painter.

== Biography ==
Little is known of his life. He was born in Hamburg in 1623. He was a battle painter influenced by Rembrandt. Weyer died in Hamburg in 1670. A battle work by him is in the collection of the National Gallery, London.

== Sources ==
- Timo Trümper: Der Hamburger Maler und Zeichner Jacob Weyer (1623-1670). Petersberg 2012.
