= Antonio da Vendri =

Italian painter

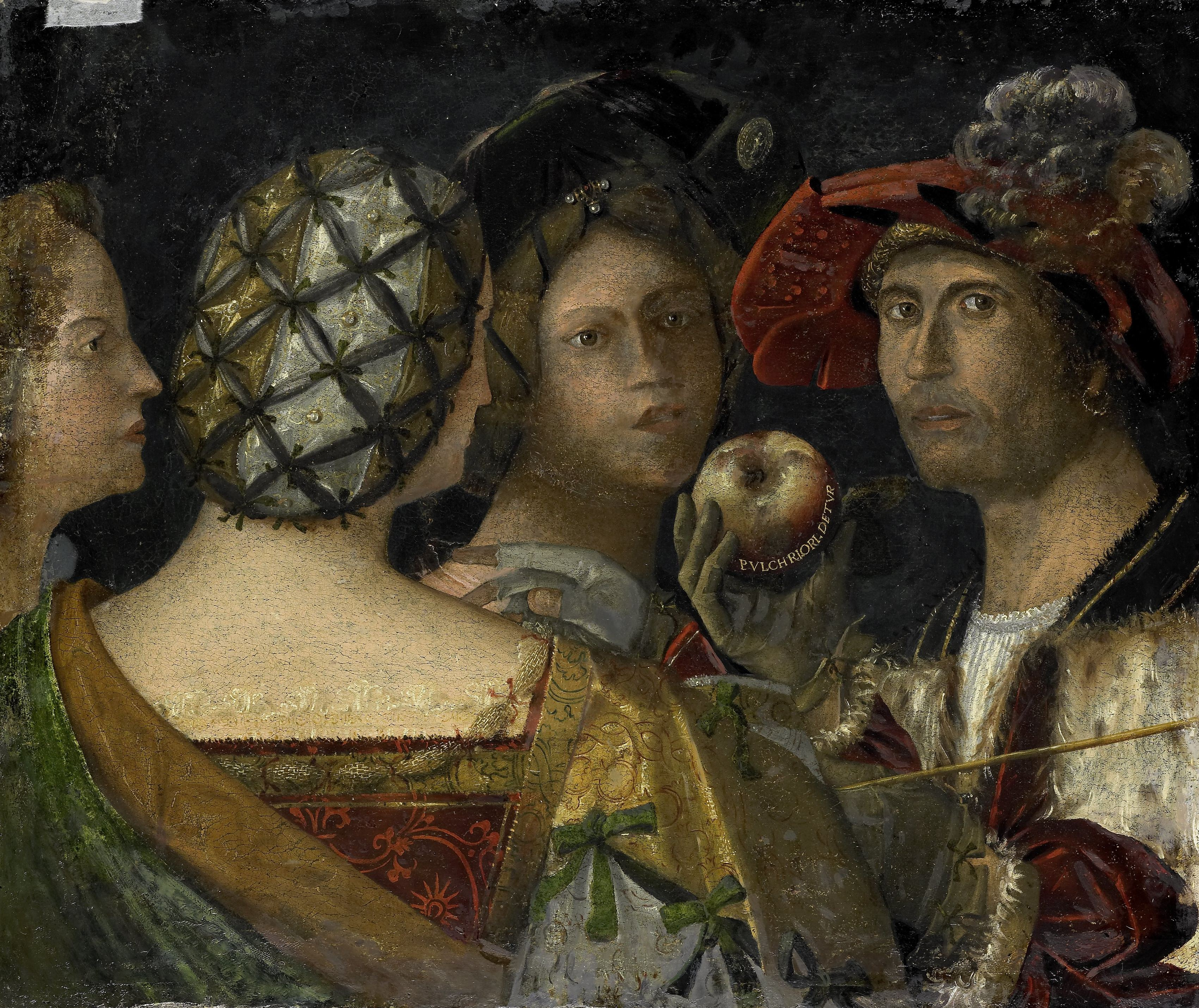
The Judgment of Paris by Antonio da Vendri, Rijksmuseum, c. 1500–1524

Antonio da Vendri (active 1517–1545) was a 16th-century Italian Renaissance painter.

Not much is known about Antonio da Vendri's life except through his works. Documents show he worked in Verona between 1517 and 1545, as a baker, tailor and most famously as a painter. As an artist he primarily painted paintings of religious themes for church commissions. The Giusti Family of Verona, one of his works, is part of the National Gallery collection. Among his other knownworks include Madonna and Child with Two Angels in 1518 (Verona, Castelvecchio Museum), and painted frescoes (now lost) in Toblino Castle near Levico Terme, Trentino in 1536 for Cardinal Bernardo Clesio. A fresco fragment attributed to Vendri, Madonna and Child and Saint Roch, survives in the church of Santa Maria in Stelle, Verona.
