= Time Orders Old Age to Destroy Beauty =

1746 painting by Pompeo Batoni

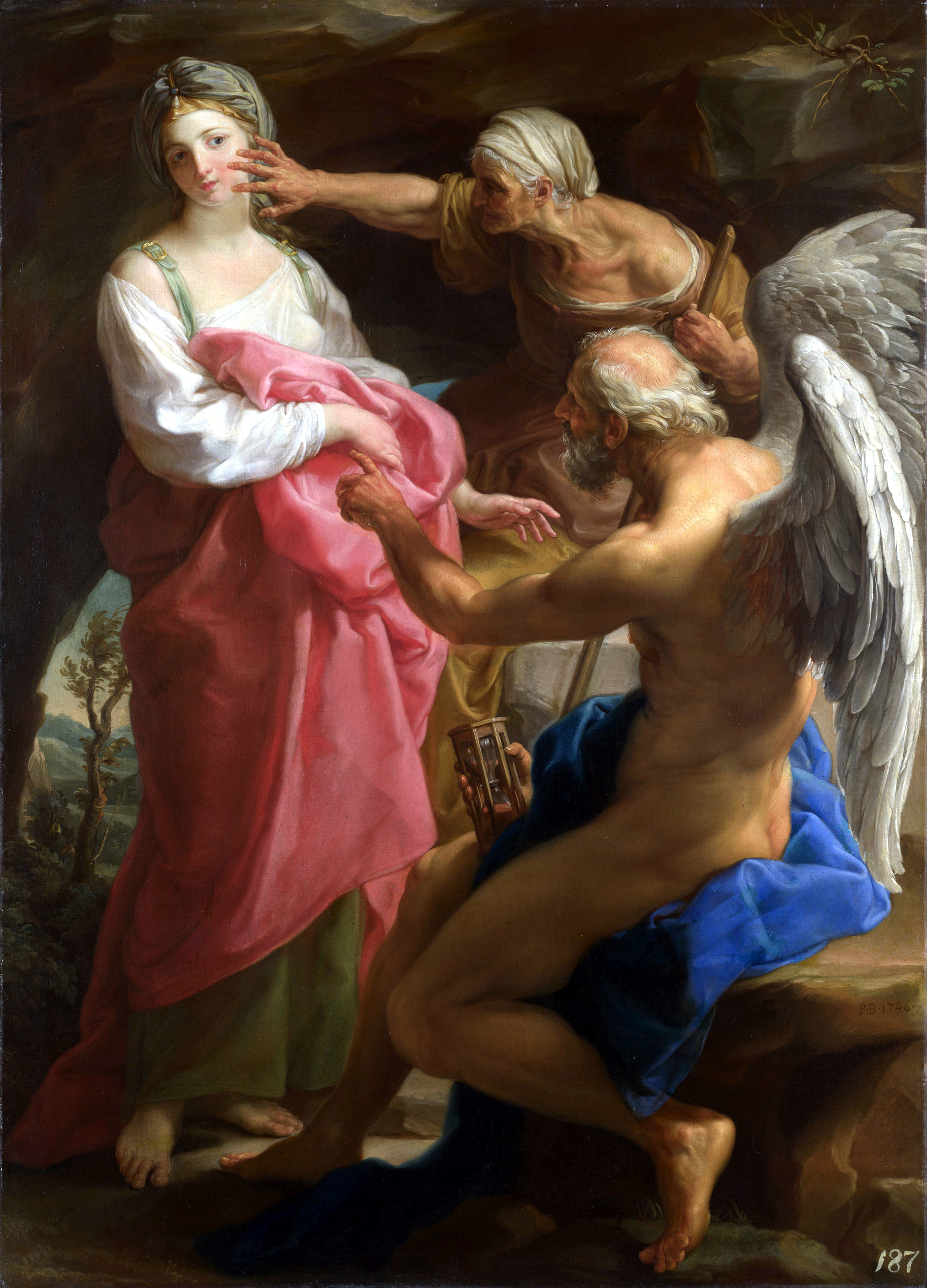
- Artist: Pompeo Batoni
- Year: 1746
- Medium: oil on canvas
- Dimensions: 135,3 cm × 96,5 cm (533 in × 380 in)
- Location: National Gallery, London
- Website: Catalogue entry

Time Orders Old Age to Destroy Beauty is a 1746 allegorical oil-on-canvas painting by the Italian artist Pompeo Batoni. It was commissioned from him by Bartolomeo Talenti, a collector from Lucca, as a pendant for La lascivia, now in the Hermitage Museum. It shows personifications of Time as an old man with a scythe, Old Age as an old woman and Beauty as a young woman. It came into the collection of the Russian count Nikolai Alexandrovich Kushelev-Bezborodko, before being acquired in 1961 by the National Gallery, London where it now hangs.
