= Saint Roch (Parmigianino) =

Painting by Parmigianino

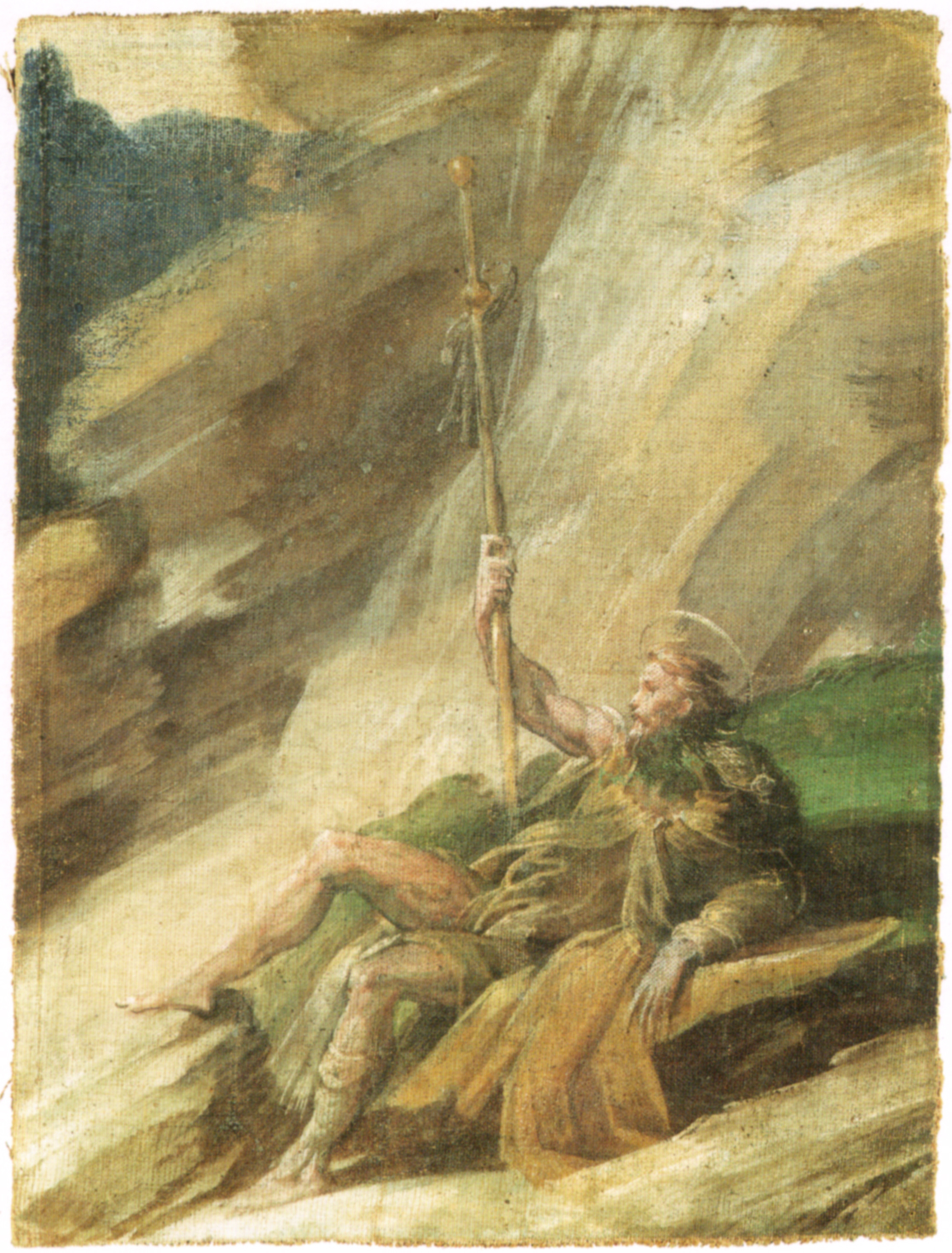
Saint Roch (c. 1528) by Parmigianino

Saint Roch is a tempera on canvas painting by Parmigianino, executed c. 1528, now in a private collection in Parma. It measures 27.8 by 21.5 cm. A preparatory study for the work survives in the Bonnat Museum in Bayonne (n. 699). Like the artist's Saint Roch with a Donor (1527), its elongated figures are typical of works produced during his stay in Bologna after escaping the Sack of Rome.

Previously in the Baiardi collection, the work is probably the "canvas with a Saint Roch sketched in colour 0.7 high 0.5 high by Parmigianino" recorded in the 1560-1566 Baiardi collection inventory. Those measurements equate to about 31.7 cm by 21.6 cm - it is now smaller due to warping visible to the naked eye. It is a fragment of a larger composition, perhaps one of the two "guazzi" described in Vasari's Lives of the Artists as commissioned in Bologna from "Maestro Luca di Leuti" - the other is probably Holy Family with the Infant Saint John the Baptist (Museo di Capodimonte).
