= British Institution =

Defunct art society

Coordinates: 51°30′21″N 0°8′13″W

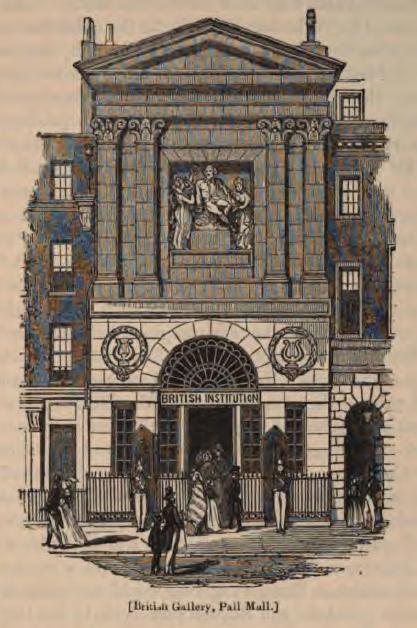
The British Institution building from a wood-engraving in London (1851) edited by Charles Knight

The British Institution (in full, the British Institution for Promoting the Fine Arts in the United Kingdom; founded 1805, disbanded 1867) was a private 19th-century society in London formed to exhibit the works of living and dead artists; it was also known as the Pall Mall Picture Galleries or the British Gallery. Unlike the Royal Academy it admitted only connoisseurs, dominated by the nobility, rather than practising artists to its membership, which along with its conservative taste led to tensions with the British artists it was intended to encourage and support. In its gallery in Pall Mall the Institution held the world's first regular temporary exhibitions of Old Master paintings, which alternated with sale exhibitions of the work of living artists; both quickly established themselves as popular parts of the London social and artistic calendar. From 1807 prizes were given to artists and surplus funds were used to buy paintings for the nation. Although it continued to attract members and visitors, in 1867, when the lease on its quarters expired, instead of renewing the society wrapped up its affairs.

== Founding ==
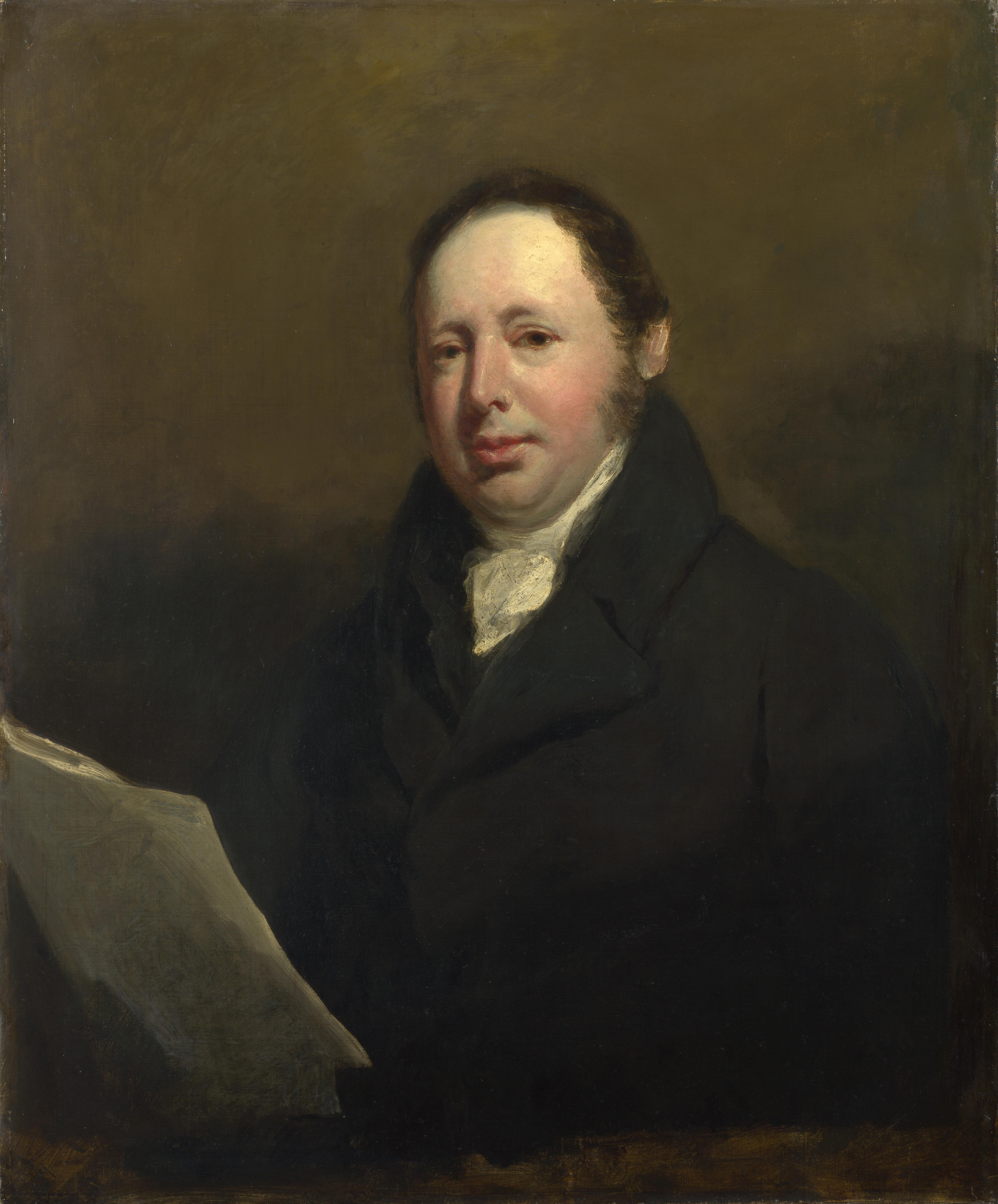
Portrait of William Seguier, the first Superintendent, in 1830 by John Jackson

The British Institution was founded in June 1805 by a group of private subscribers who met in the Thatched House Tavern in London. A committee was formed, and in September of that year it purchased the lease of the former Boydell Shakespeare Gallery building at 52 Pall Mall, with 62 years remaining, for a premium of £4,500 and an annual ground rent of £125. The British Institution opened at the Pall Mall site on 18 January 1806.

The founding "Hereditory Governors" included Sir George Beaumont, 7th Baronet and Charles Long, 1st Baron Farnborough, both of whom had employed the services of the leading dealer and picture-cleaner William Seguier, and were probably responsible for his appointment as "Superintendent". Seguier later became Surveyor of the King's Pictures and when the National Gallery, London was founded in 1824, was appointed as the first Keeper, holding all three positions until his death in 1843, as well as continuing to run his business. Above Seguier the Institution had a Keeper, a role given to a series of engravers. The Superintendent was responsible for organizing and hanging the shows, a role that inevitably gave rise to grumbling and worse from artists – at the Royal Academy a committee was responsible for the hang, which allowed someone else to be blamed, but Seguier had no such opportunity to share the blame. In 1833 John Constable wrote with heavy irony of having received a visit in his studio from "a much greater man than the King—the Duke of Bedford—Lord Westminster—Lord Egremont, or the President of the Royal Academy — "MR SEGUIER"." When in 1832 two pictures by Richard Parkes Bonington, who had been dead only four years, were included in an "Old Masters" exhibition, Constable (who was twenty-six years older than Bonington) wrote that Seguier was "carrying on a Humbugg".

Other founding Governors included George Legge, 3rd Earl of Dartmouth as President, the Marquess of Stafford, Sir Francis Baring, 1st Baronet, William Holwell Carr, John Julius Angerstein, Sir Abraham Hume, 2nd Baronet, Sir Thomas Bernard, 3rd Baronet, and others. They were essentially the same group who were to succeed in persuading the government to found the National Gallery in 1824, and whose gifts to it provided most of the early collection. There was a total group of 125 Governors, Directors and Subscribers, paying sums between 100 guineas (56 of them, 35 at 50g., 11 at 10g.) down to one guinea annually. In 1805 the initial subscribers consisted of "One duke, five marquesses, fourteen earls, two viscounts, nine lords, two bishops, four ladies, seven baronets, twenty-two members of parliament, five clergymen and above fifty private gentlemen, bankers and merchants". The Institution had been discussed with the Royal Academy before it was established, and relations were friendly, at least initially, though later there were to be tensions. The Prince Regent was Patron from the foundation, and loans from the Royal Collection continued throughout the life of the Institution. In 1822 the hereditary nature of the Governors was eased out, as they were becoming far too numerous, and the bottom end of the Subscribership tightened up.

The gallery building had been commissioned in 1788 by the engraver and print publisher John Boydell as a showroom for his Boydell Shakespeare Gallery, a large and financially unsuccessful project for a series of paintings and prints of scenes from works by William Shakespeare. The architect was George Dance the Younger, the then clerk of the city works. The gallery had a monumental, neo-classical stone-built front, and three exhibition rooms on the first floor, with a total of more than 4,000 square feet (370 m^{2}) of wall space for displaying pictures. Boydell ran up large debts in producing his Shakespeare engravings, and obtained an Act of Parliament in 1804 to dispose of the gallery and other property by lottery. The main prize winner, William Tassie, a modeller and maker of replica engraved gems, then sold the gallery property and contents at auction. When the British Institution took possession, they also retained a sculptural group on the façade by Thomas Banks, which had been intended to be used as a monument on Boydell's tomb.

== Modern exhibitions ==
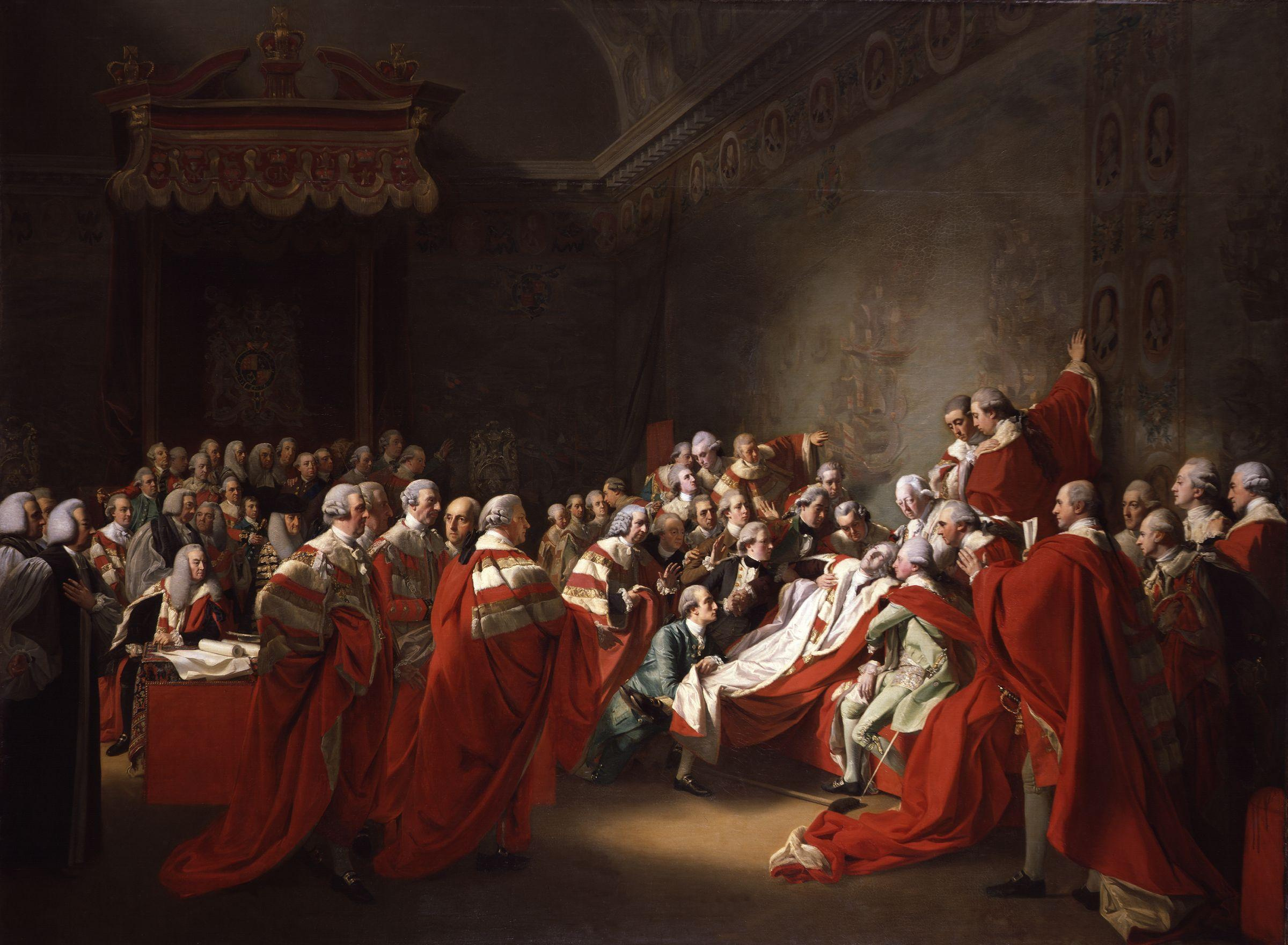
Collapse of the Earl of Chatham in the House of Lords, 7 July 1778 by John Singleton Copley; exhibited in the first exhibition, although over 20 years old.

The price of admission remained one shilling throughout the life of the Institution. There were some private openings in the evenings, for members and (separately) exhibitors, these being divided into two by splitting the alphabet. The number of modern works exhibited grew within a few years to over 500. The first exhibition contained 257 works (including sculptures and some enamels and miniatures) with a good selection of the leading British artists, including (selecting on their modern rather than contemporary reputations) two Turners, two Stubbs paintings and five enamels, fourteen Benjamin Wests, four Paul Sandby's, two by Thomas Lawrence, one a huge history painting, three Copleys including his Death of Chatham, four James Wards, as well as 24 pictures from the Arabian Nights by Robert Smirke, who was to turn against the Institution.

Within a few years the number of works regularly reached over 500, and many had to be rejected. The 1806 receipts for the shilling entries were £534 & 4s implying 10,684 paying visitors above the members and their guests. In 1810 the Institution announced that in its first four years a total of 424 works had been sold, raising £20,900 for the artists (the Institution took no cut of sales); by 1826 this cumulative figure was over £75,000. In 1814 the Emperor of Russia and King of Prussia were among the visitors, apparently without buying.

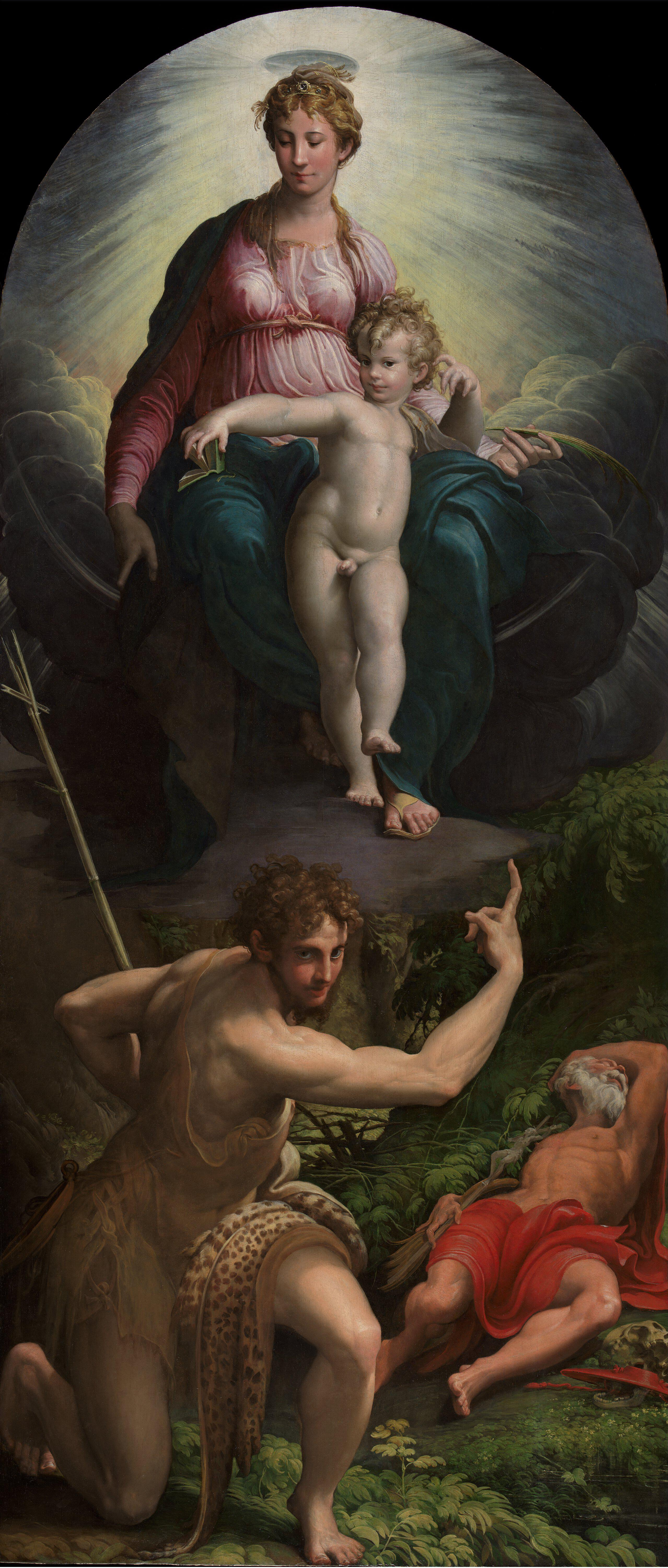
Vision of Saint Jerome by Parmigianino, bought in 1823 for £3,302 for presentation to the National Gallery

Perhaps because many large history paintings were submitted, and indeed encouraged by the Institution, the number of works included fell in the late 1810s: in 1818 309 were exhibited and 65 sold, for £2,623, typical for these years, though from 1828 there were usually over 500 until the late 1830s after which numbers in the mid-400s were typical until about 1850, when they rose again. The Institution largely remained faithful to the hierarchy of genres and saw the encouragement of history painting as an aim, especially as opposed to portraits, traditionally the mainstay of the British market. Its exhibitions were by 1850 falling behind developments in British art; few Pre-Raphaelite works were exhibited there, though Ford Madox Brown's oval Hampstead landscape was seen and disliked there by John Ruskin in 1855.

== Patronage ==
After the first exhibition the gallery was kept open as a free school for artists, with members lending a variety of Old Masters for them to copy; at this stage the public could not see these displays. From 1807 a number of prizes of £100 or £50 were given to students at the school who painted the best companion pieces to works by Old Masters on display at the gallery. These were later increased and extended to other artists, reaching 300, 200 and 100 guineas by 1811.

The Institution commissioned or bought a number of paintings which were presented to the National Gallery, and some other institutions. In 1826 they presented the Vision of Saint Jerome or Madonna and Child with Saints by Parmigianino (bought in 1823 for £3,302), the Consecration of Saint Nicholas by Paolo Veronese (bought in 1811 for £1,575), and in 1830 the Market Cart by Thomas Gainsborough (bt 1829, Lord Gwydir's Sale, 1050 gn) and a Holy Family by Reynolds (same, 1950 gn.). Modern works included Benjamin West's Christ Healing the Sick in the Temple, for which the very high price of 3,000 guineas was paid, though this was more than recouped by sales of an engraving commissioned by the Institution. It was given to the National Gallery, but later transferred along with their British collection to what is now Tate Britain.

In 1814 Mary anointing the Feet of Christ by William Hilton was bought for 550 gn. and given to a church in the City. and the following year 1,000 gn was set aside for premiums for oil sketches of subjects showing "the successes of the British Army in Spain, Portugal or France", producing many submissions the following year, for which two 150 gn. premiums were awarded, and James Ward commissioned for 1,000 gn to do a full-size version of his Allegory of Waterloo. Another Waterloo work was given to the Royal Hospital, Chelsea. Other religious paintings were bought for London churches, and a new competition announced for two works on Nelson's victories to be given to Greenwich Hospital. In 1826 the Institution announced that nearly £5,000 in premiums, and over £14,000 on purchases had been spent to date, but from the 1830s the number and size of premiums slackens and the last premiums were in 1842, after which sums like £50 were given to artists' charities instead, and in later years no donations are recorded. In 1850 the Institution recorded a total of £28,515 in purchases, prizes and donations since 1806. By the 1850s the overall prosperity of the market for contemporary paintings had hugely increased.

== Heyday of the Institution ==
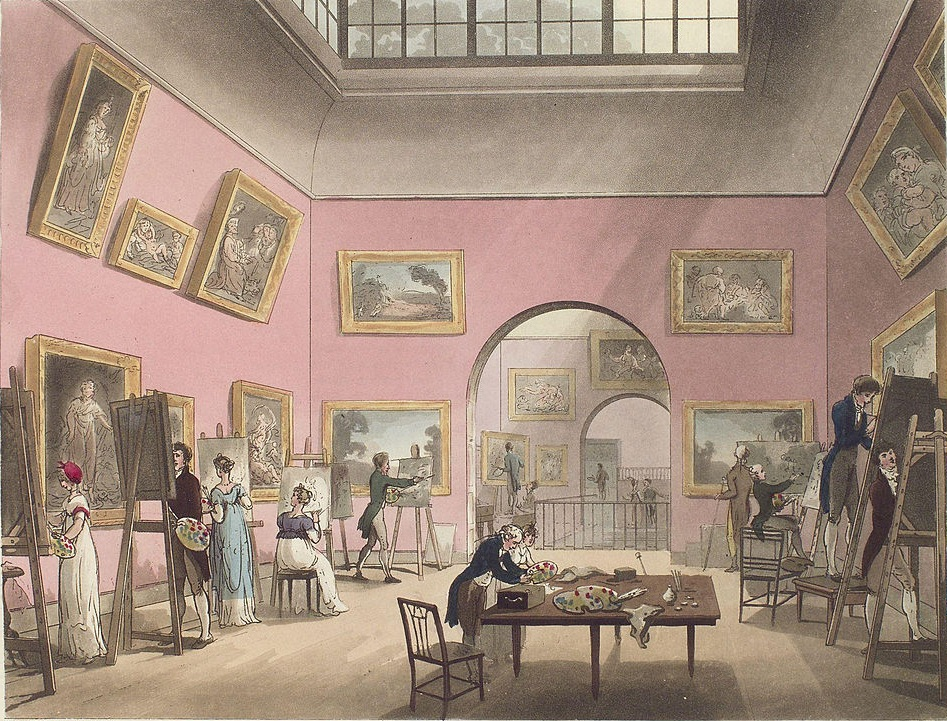
The British Institution (Pall Mall) by Rudolph Ackermann – 1808, with artists copying works

The Old Masters exhibitions were mainly loans from the members. The first was in 1813, entirely consisting of 143 works by Sir Joshua Reynolds, and the next year 53 William Hogarths, 73 Gainsboroughs, 85 Richard Wilsons and 12 by Zoffany were shown. In 1815 for the first time the Institution showed foreign art – Dutch and Flemish – and upset many British artists by a preface to the catalogue, implying in a rather too patronizing manner that British artists had a lot to learn from them. Robert Smirke is generally accepted as the anonymous author of a series of satirical "Catalogues Raisonnés" published in 1815–16, which savagely lampooned the Directors, the great and the good of British art patronage. William Hazlitt rejoined with a long piece of laboured sarcasm in defence of the Institution. At this time the Old Masters were exhibited in the winter, and the living artists in the summer. In 1816 Italian and Spanish works were shown, including two of the Raphael Cartoons and several important works from the Orleans Collection; most of the consortium who had split this up were Directors of the Institution.

The foreign schools rotated until 1825 when only selected loaned works by living British artists were shown, and for the next two years only works from the Royal Collection, essentially the new collections of the Prince Regent, by now King George IV. In 1830 all 91 works were by the recently dead Sir Thomas Lawrence, including all the pictures from the Waterloo Gallery at Windsor Castle; his nieces received the £3,000 of ticket sales.

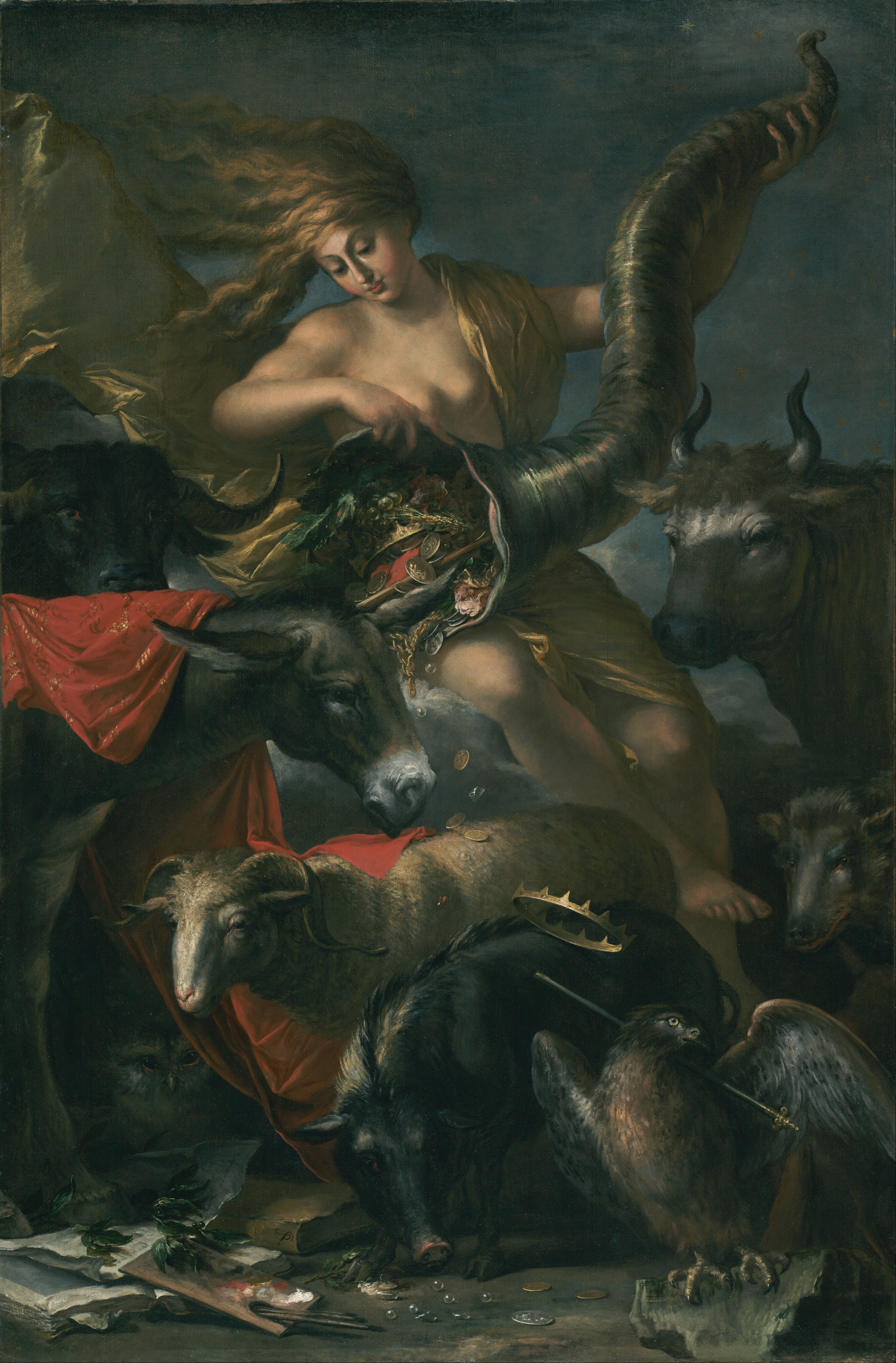
Allegory of Fortune by Salvator Rosa, shown in 1859, when owned by the Duke of Beaufort. It was then apparently never exhibited in England until 2010, by which time it belonged to the Getty Museum.

In 1838 the living French artist Paul Delaroche was treated as an Old Master to allow exhibition of two of his large works on British history including Charles I Insulted by Cromwell's Soldiers. In 1848 the designation was extended in the other direction with a group of early masters including Giotto and Jan van Eyck (attributions that perhaps would not be maintained today). This was still somewhat bold for the time. The 1851 show, coinciding with vast numbers of tourists flocking to the Great Exhibition, had 120 pictures from 47 collections, intended to show the cream of British collections. The selection gives an interesting view of taste at the mid-century.

Later, by 1832 as reported by Passavant, the Institution's routine was to hold a spring exhibition of paintings by contemporary artists, available for purchase, followed by a summer exhibition of old masters. By the time of an 1835 visit by Thomas Carlyle, the gallery had become known colloquially as the Pall Mall Picture Galleries or the British Gallery, and was still among the popular society haunts. The Times called it "the favourite lounge of the nobility and gentry", and artists grumbled that it imposed aristocratic tastes on the viewing public. Tourist guides in the 1840s reported that the spring exhibition ran from the start of February to the first week of May, closing a week after the Royal Academy exhibition opened, and the old masters exhibition from the first week of June to the end of August, with some works remaining in the galleries for a month or more for artists to copy:

"Here are two exhibitions in the course of every year – one of living artists, in the Spring, and one of old masters, in the Summer. The latter exhibition is one of the most interesting sights of the London season to the lovers of the Fine Arts. Admission, 1s. Observe – Bas-relief of Shakespeare, between Poetry and Painting, on the front of the building, (cost 500 guineas), and a Mourning Achilles, in the hall of the Institution – both by Thomas Banks, R.A." from Peter Cunningham, Hand-Book of London, 1850

By 1850 the Queen was Patroness, and the Directors a new generation of Dukes, Marquesses and Earls, with a couple of bankers (Hope and Baring) and the ever-present Samuel Rogers. Despite the apparently flourishing state of the Institution, when the term of the 1805 lease expired in 1867 it was dissolved; according to The Art Journal the modern exhibitions had been declining in popularity, but not the Old Masters. Even so, they reported that 150 pictures were sold from the modern exhibition in 1865, and 147 in 1864. A chance to buy the freehold in 1846 for £10,000 was missed, and it would have cost £25,000 by the 1860s. The remaining funds were used to establish scholarships for artists, and the Royal Academy took over the holding of loan exhibitions of Old Masters. When the gallery building was demolished during 1868–1869, the Banks sculpture from the building's façade was moved to Stratford-upon-Avon and re-erected in New Place Garden.

== Exhibits ==
A complete dictionary of the contributors and their work from the foundation of the institution was compiled by Algernon Graves FSA and published in 1908, titled The British Institution 1806 - 1867.
