= The Circumcision (Parmigianino) =

Painting by Parmigianino

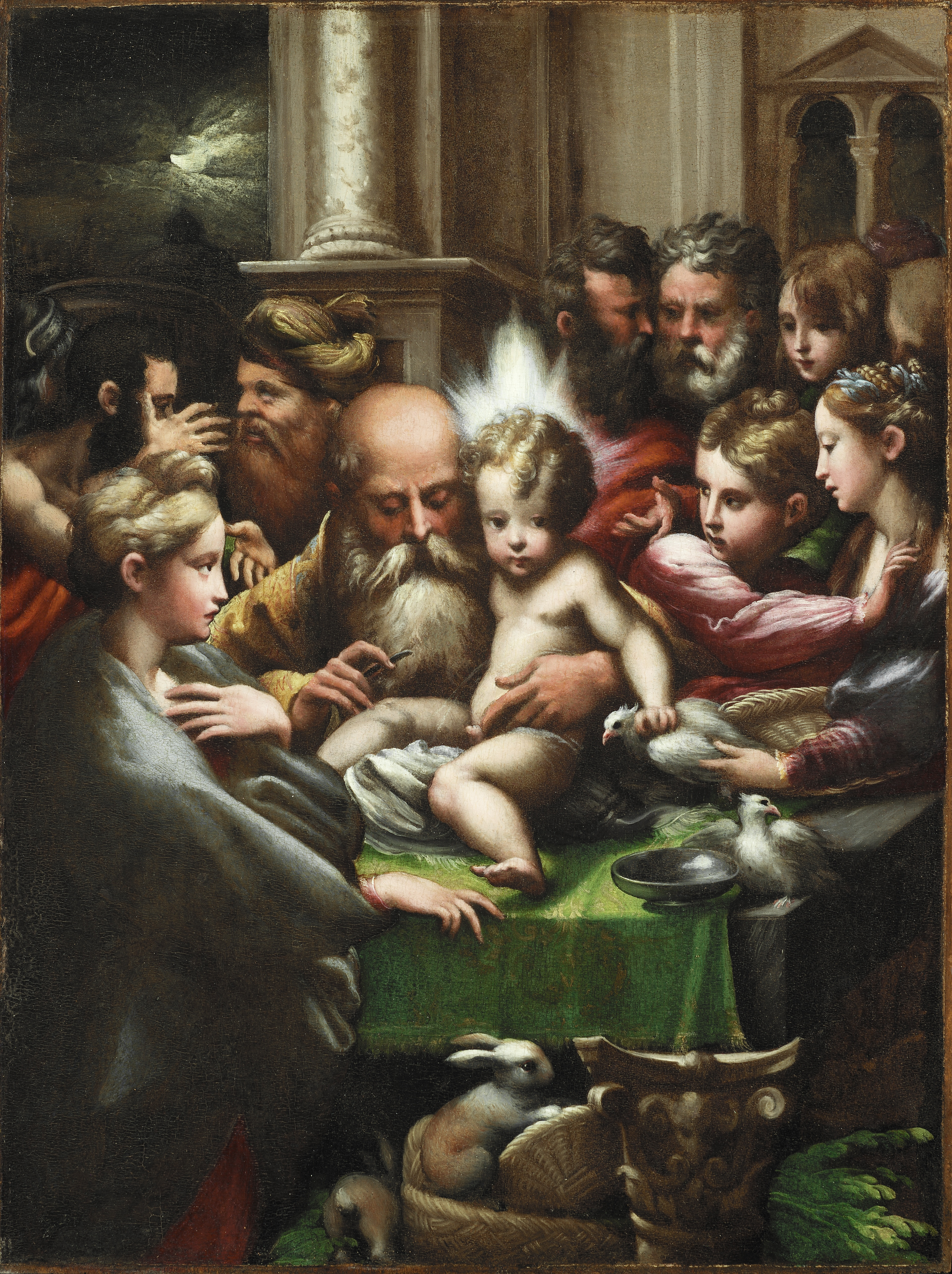
- Artist: Parmigianino
- Year: c. 1523
- Medium: Oil on panel
- Dimensions: 42 cm × 31.4 cm (17 in × 12.4 in)
- Location: Detroit Institute of Arts, Detroit

The Circumcision, a painting by the Italian Mannerist artist Parmigianino of the common subject of the circumcision of Jesus, was executed around 1523 and is now in the Detroit Institute of Arts, Michigan, United States.

== History ==
Giorgio Vasari, the late Renaissance biographer of artists, described a depiction of the Circumcision by Parmigianino. However, his description does not match the Detroit painting: he described a series of characters holding torches and walking which do not appear in this work.

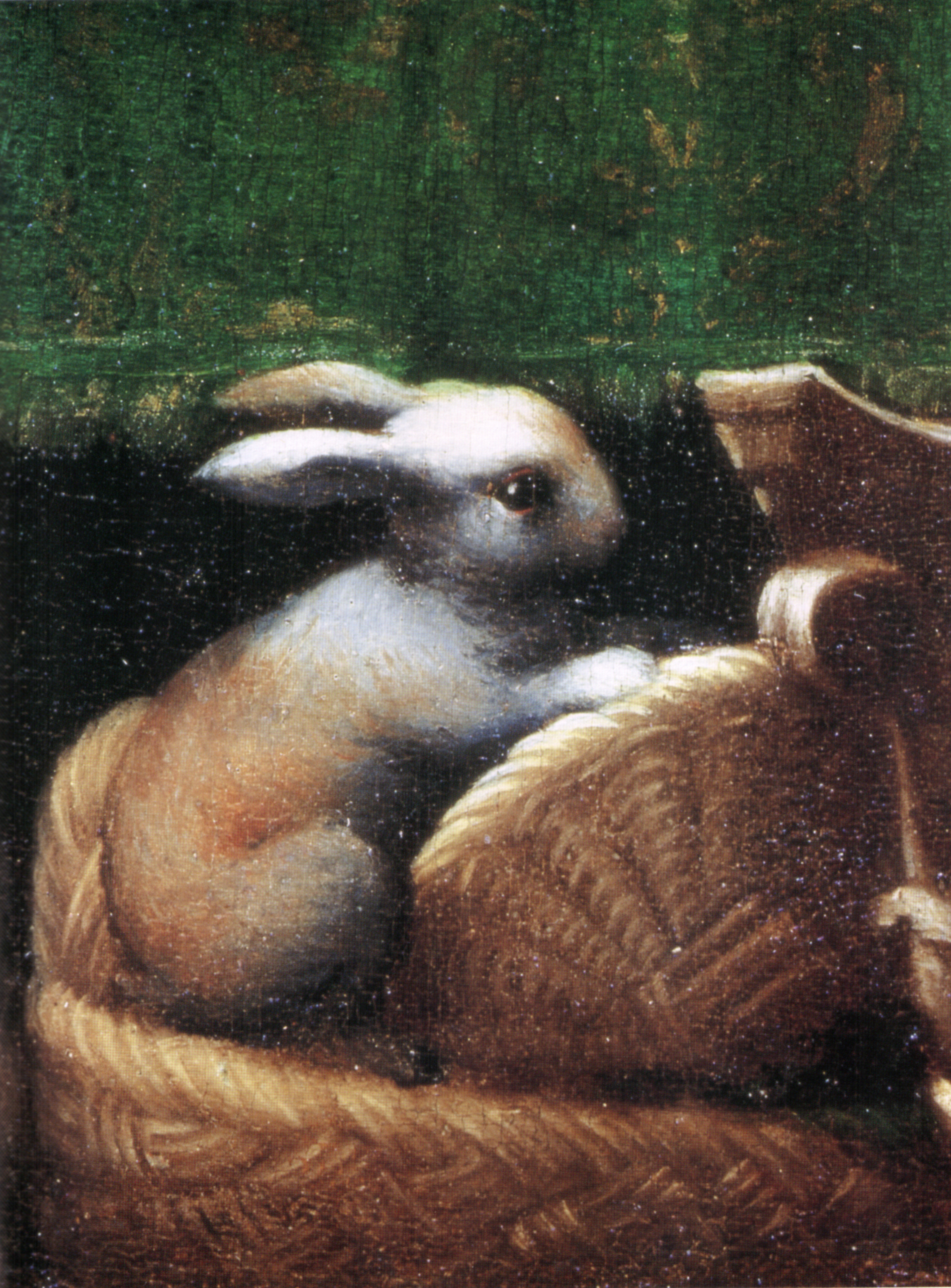
Detail of a rabbit.

The painting is known with certainty only starting from the 1830s, when it was part of the Russian imperial collection, and was copied in an 1851 etching by J. W. Muxel. In 1917 it was acquired at Stockholm by A.B. Nordiska Kompaniet, which a few years later sold it to the American Axel Beskow. In 1936 he donated the work to the Detroit museum.

The painting was not unanimously attributed to Parmigianino until 1991.

The dating from around 1523 is based on comparison with early other works by the artist and by a preparatory drawing at the Cabinet des Dessins (inv. 6390) of the Louvre museum.

== Description ==
The work shows the circumcision of Jesus as described in the Gospel of Luke; the two sacrificial doves refer to the connected act of the purification of Mary. The Christ child, well illuminated, is surrounded by a crowd of characters. At the left is a very young Madonna, with blonde hair, similar to the artist's Saint Barbara at the Museo del Prado. Also on the left, behind her, are two characters confabulating on a background with the rising sun.

At the right are two rows of figures, as well as the priest who holds Jesus on the altar and, in the other hand, the ritual knife. Below, between the offers, are two small rabbits, which resembles similar details in the arch of the first chapel frescoed by Parmigianino in the church of San Giovanni Evangelista at Parma.

== Sources ==
- de Castris, Pierluigi Leone (2003). Parmigianino e il manierismo europeo. Cinisello Balsamo: Silvana editoriale. pp. 236–237. ISBN 88-8215-481-5.
