= Turkish Slave =

Painting by Parmigianino

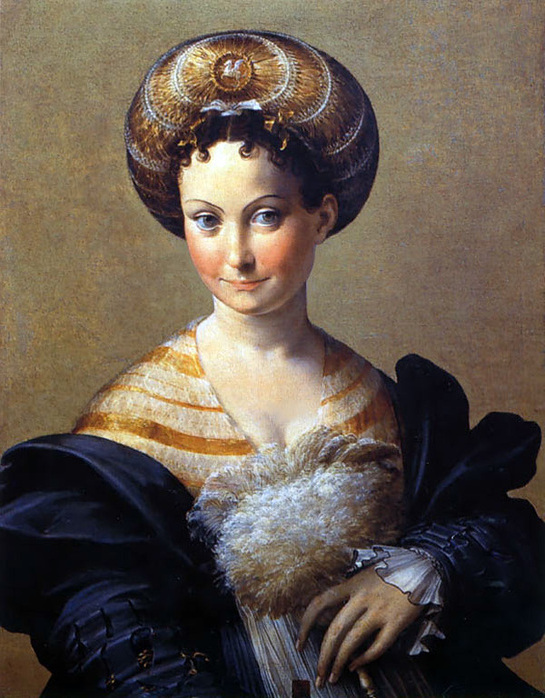
- Artist: Parmigianino
- Year: c. 1533
- Medium: Oil on panel
- Dimensions: 67 cm × 53 cm (26 in × 21 in)
- Location: Galleria nazionale di Parma, Parma

Turkish Slave (Italian: Schiava turca), also called Portrait of a Young Woman, is a painting by the Italian Mannerist artist Parmigianino. The painting was executed around 1533. It is housed in the Galleria nazionale di Parma.

The title derives from the misinterpretation of the sitter's headwear as a turban. It is in fact a typical headdress of noblewomen of the time called a balzo, with examples appearing in numerous contemporary portraits. She is wearing a chemise under her elaborately sleeved dress called a guimp and is holding a feather fan used as a flywhisk.

== History ==
The work was in the Uffizi Gallery until 1928, when it was exchanged for two 13th-century panels and a portrait thought to be of Philip, Duke of Parma by Giuseppe Baldrighi and later recognized as a self-portrait. It had arrived in Florence through Cardinal Leopoldo de' Medici, who owned it as early as 1675 and left it to the Medici Cabinet after his death. It is mentioned in the Uffizi inventories of 1704 and 1890, being listed in the latter as "Portrait of a Young Woman with a turban on her head, with the left she holds a plume, by Parmigianino's hand".

The work was restored in 1968, at which time the dark background was removed and a uniform, earth-like color was discovered. The intervention, however, has been criticized, since several art historians consider the black background as a later intervention by Parmigianino himself.

== Description ==
The subject is a young woman with brown hair and eyes, portrayed as a half-figure. She wears a white silk dress or bodice striped with gold. Her over-dress of indigo blue satin has large puffed sleeves and is worn low around the shoulders, revealing the bodice. She also wears a soft embroidered apron on her belly of a type also represented in the painting Antea by the same artist. On the head she wears a doughnut-shaped headdress sewn with gilt thread and decorated by a medallion portraying Pegasus, perhaps a metaphor of love or a heraldic reference to the Cavalli family. This style of headwear was fashionable for women of the time, invented for Isabella d'Este and featured in numerous female portraits from the Lombard and Padan area in the early 16th century.

On the hand, whose slender fingers are typical of Parmigianino art, she wears a small ring, perhaps a reference to a recent marriage. She holds a plume used to fan herself, depicted with highly detailed brushstrokes.

The proposed identifications of the woman include Giulia Gonzaga at the time of her marriage to Vespasiano Gonzaga and Veronica Gambara.

== Sources ==
- de Castris, Pierluigi Leone (2003). Parmigianino e il manierismo europeo. Cinisello Balsamo: Silvana editoriale. pp. 236–237. ISBN 88-8215-481-5.
