= Casalmaggiore Altarpiece =

Painting by Parmigianino

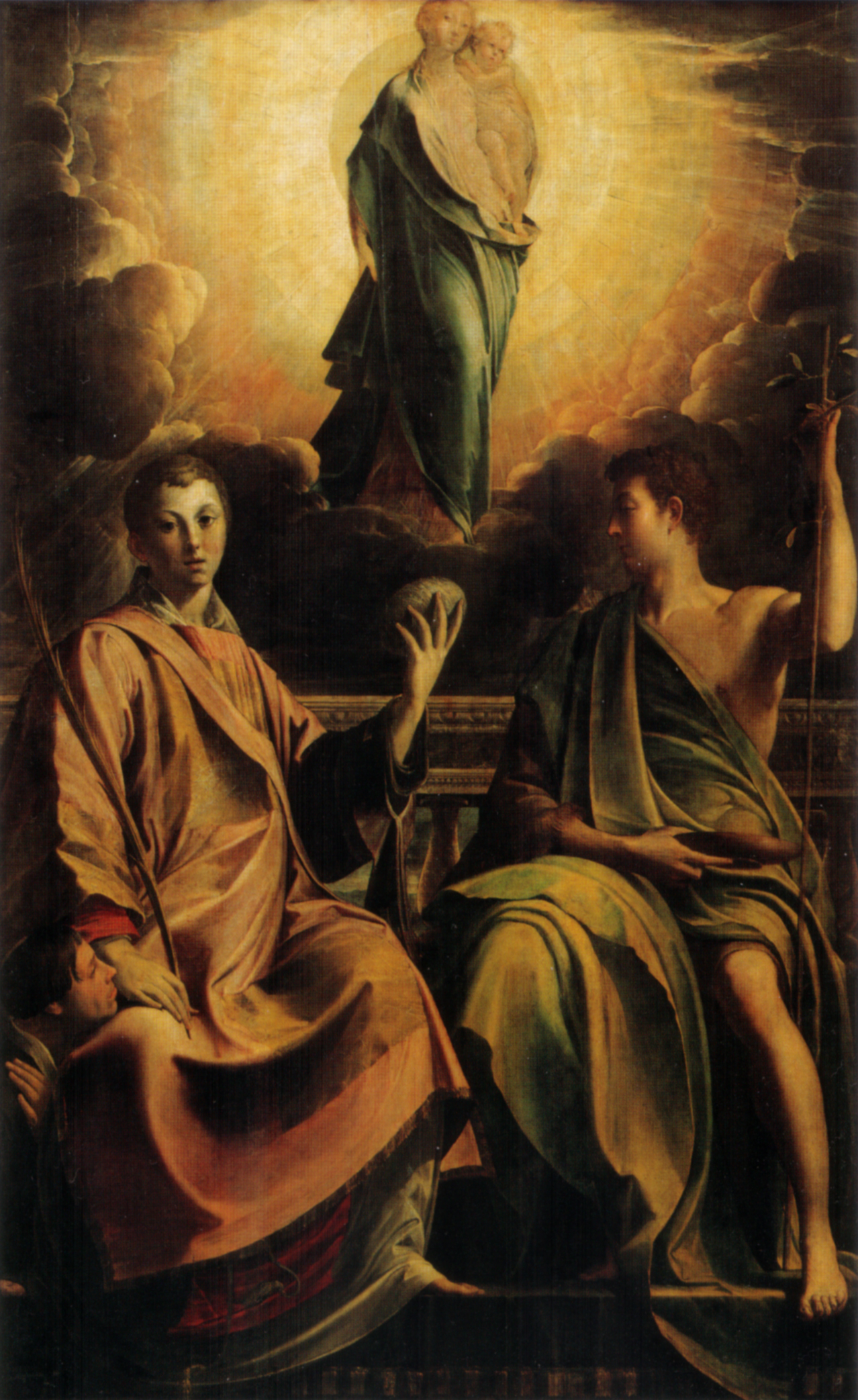
- Artist: Parmigianino
- Year: 1540
- Medium: Oil on panel
- Dimensions: 253 cm × 161 cm (100 in × 63 in)
- Location: Gemäldegalerie Alte Meister, Dresden

The Casalmaggiore Altarpiece is an oil on panel painting by Parmigianino, from 1540. It is held in the Gemäldegalerie Alte Meister, in Dresden, which acquired it from the Este collection in 1746.

It is named after Casalmaggiore, whither the artist had fled from Parma after imprisonment for non-compliance by the priors of Santa Maria della Steccata and where he spent five months before dying of a fever. It was commissioned for the church of Santo Stefano (now the Duomo) in the town and in 1846 Mortara recorded a tradition that the commissioner was Matteo Cavalli and that Cavalli is shown resting his head on Saint Stephen's leg in the lower left of the work. A preparatory study survives in the Royal Collection at Windsor Castle, along with a drawing of the Madonna and Child for the work in the Gabinetto dei Disegni e delle Stampe in Florence.

The work remained in Santo Stefano for at least a century before the local community allowed it to be moved to the Galleria Estense in Modena, hoping this would win the Este family over to making the church a collegiate one - Correggio's Casalmaggiore Madonna was also given up on similar grounds. This transaction occurred during Francesco I d'Este's temporary occupation of the town in 1647 during his war with Spain, though its citizens had first been forewarned of the work's interest to collectors by a 1602 visit from Palmerio Celestani, an intermediary for Ferdinando Gonzaga - a letter dated 14 February 1602 states Celestani met the church's priest, who was willing to sell the work, though for an unknown reason the sale was not completed.
