= Madonna with the Long Neck =

Painting by Parmigianino

- Madonna dal collo lungo (Italian)
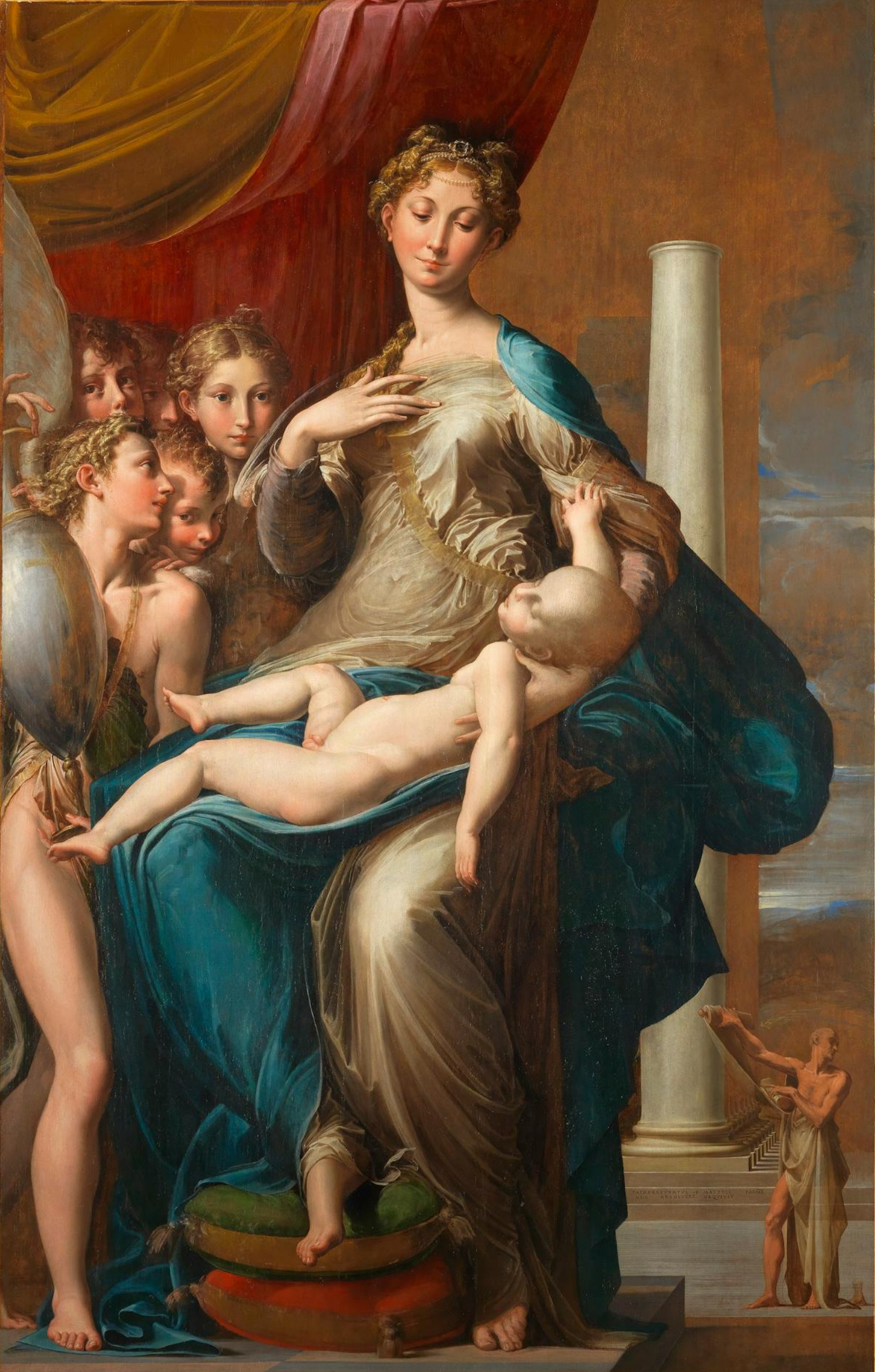
- After restoration
- Artist: Parmigianino
- Year: 1535-40
- Type: Oil on wood
- Dimensions: 216 cm × 132 cm (85 in × 52 in)
- Location: Uffizi, Florence

The Madonna with the Long Neck (Italian: Madonna dal collo lungo), also known as Madonna and Long Child with Angels and St. Jerome, is an Italian Mannerist oil painting by Parmigianino, dating from c. 1535-1540 and depicting Madonna and Child with angels. The painting began in 1534 for the funerary chapel of Francesco Tagliaferri in Parma, but remained incomplete on Parmigianino's death in 1540. Ferdinando de' Medici, Grand Prince of Tuscany, purchased it in 1698 and it has been on display at the Uffizi since 1948.

== Description ==
The painting depicts the Virgin Mary seated on a high pedestal in luxurious robes, holding a large baby Jesus on her lap. Six angels crowded together on the Madonna's right adore the Christ-child. In the lower right-hand corner of the painting is an enigmatic scene, with a row of marble columns and the emaciated figure of St. Jerome. A depiction of St. Jerome was required by the commissioner because of the saint's connection with the adoration of the Virgin Mary.

The painting is popularly called Madonna of the Long Neck because "the painter, in his eagerness to make the Holy Virgin look graceful and elegant, has given her a neck like that of a swan." On the unusual arrangement of figures, Austrian-British art historian E. H. Gombrich writes:

Instead of distributing his figures in equal pairs on both sides of the Madonna, he crammed a jostling crowd of angels into a narrow corner, and left the other side wide open to show the tall figure of the prophet, so reduced in size through the distance that he hardly reaches the Madonna's knee. There can be no doubt, then, that if this be madness there is method in it. The painter wanted to be unorthodox. He wanted to show that the classical solution of perfect harmony is not the only solution conceivable ... Parmigianino and all the artists of his time who deliberately sought to create something new and unexpected, even at the expense of the 'natural' beauty established by the great masters, were perhaps the first 'modern' artists.

Parmigianino has distorted nature for his own artistic purposes, creating a typical Mannerist figura serpentinata. Jesus is also extremely large for a baby, and he lies precariously on Mary's lap as if about to fall at any moment. The Madonna herself is of hardly human proportions—she is almost twice the size of the angels to her right. Her right foot rests on cushions that appear to be only a few inches away from the picture plane, but the foot itself seems to project beyond it, and is thus on "our" side of the canvas, breaking the conventions of a framed picture. Her slender hands and long fingers have also led the Italian medical scientist Vito Franco of the University of Palermo to diagnose that Parmigianino's model had the genetic disorder Marfan syndrome affecting her connective tissue.

Following a recent restoration of the painting, the unfinished face of an angel just below the Madonna's right elbow can be seen more clearly. Also the angel in the middle of the bottom row now looks at the vase held by the angel on his right, in which can be seen the faint image of a cross. Before the restoration this angel looked down at the Christ child. The changes made during the restoration likely reflect the original painting, which must have been altered at some time in its history. The angel who faces the viewer has a resemblance to Parmigianino's Antea portrait.
