= Baptism of Christ (Parmigianino) =

Painting by Parmigianino

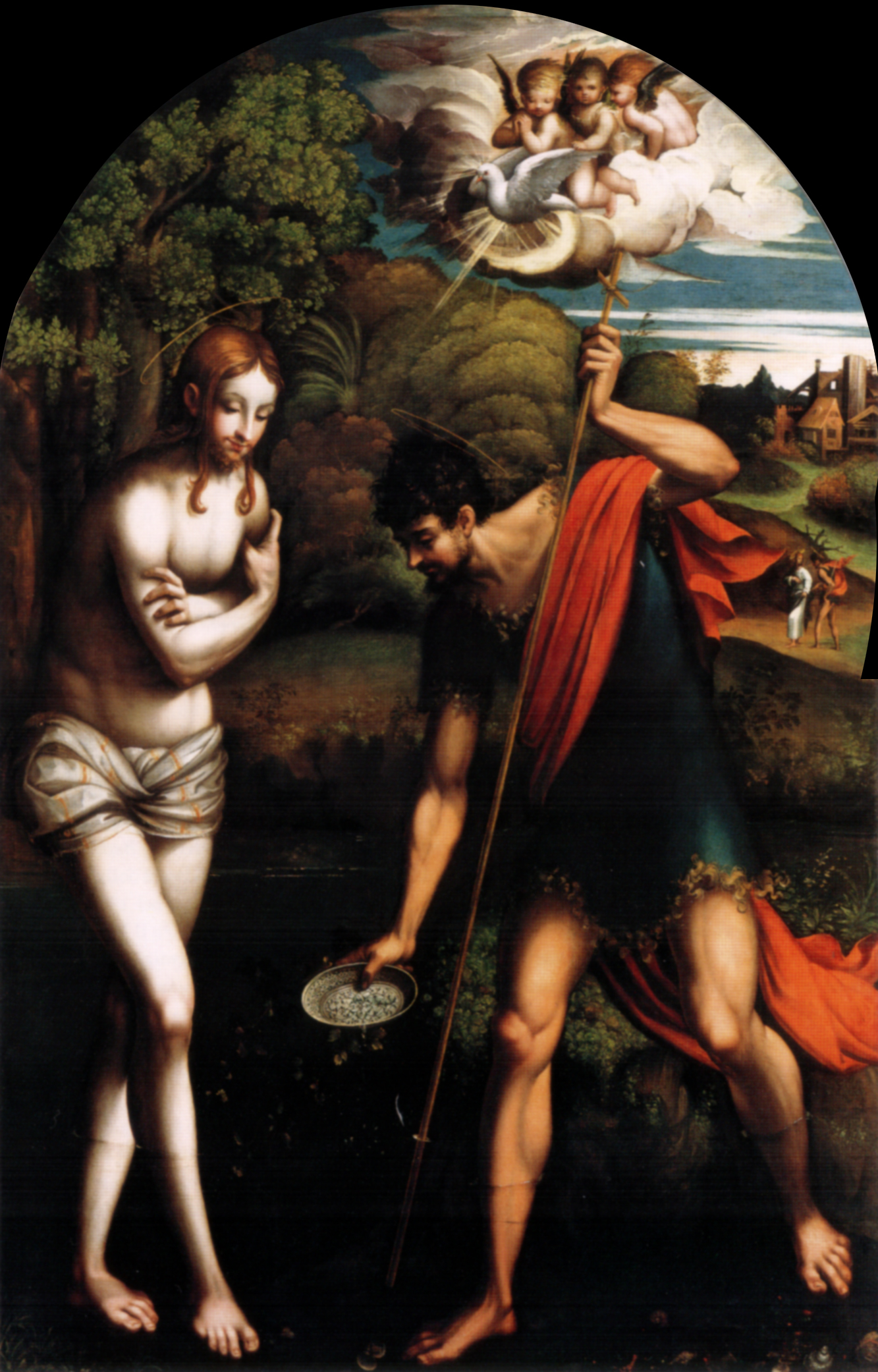
Baptism of Christ (c. 1519) by Parmigianino

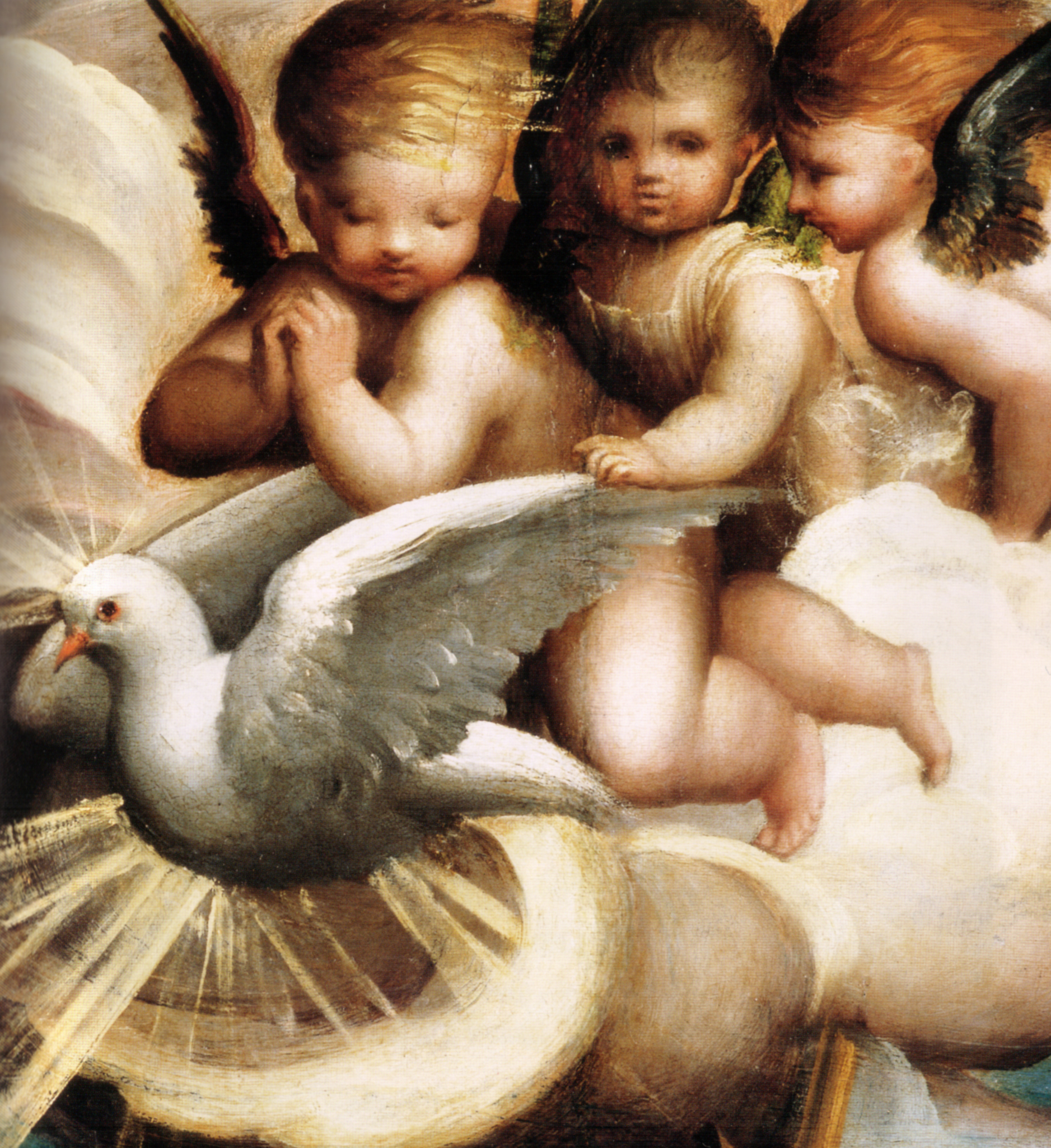
Detail

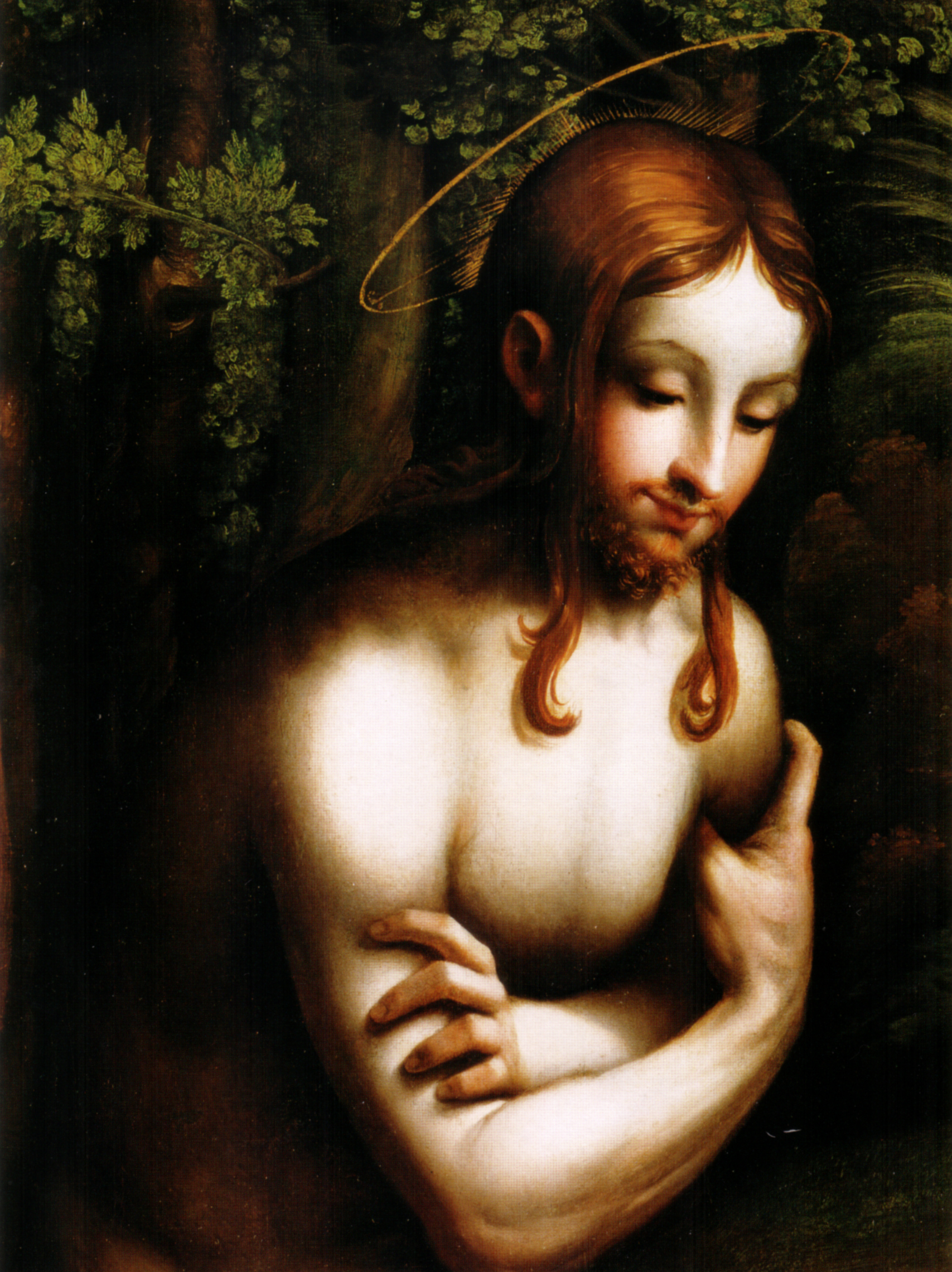
Detail

Baptism of Christ is an oil on panel painting by Parmigianino, executed c. 1519, the earliest surviving work by the artist, produced when he was only sixteen. It is now in the Gemäldegalerie in Berlin.

It is usually identified with an anecdote in Vasari's Lives of the Artists:

after achieving miraculous things in drawing, he made a panel painting of his own invention, a St John the Baptist Baptising Christ, in which he so painted that still makes those who see it wonder that so fine a thing was made by a child. This painting was placed in Parma in the Nunziata church, run by the frati de' Zoccoli

== Bibliography (in Italian) ==
- Luisa Viola, Parmigianino, Parma, 2007
- Mario Di Giampaolo ed Elisabetta Fadda, Parmigianino, Keybook, Santarcangelo di Romagna 2002. ISBN 8818-02236-9
- "Article - Fondazione Zeri".
