= Bardi Altarpiece (Parmigianino) =

Painting by Parmigianino

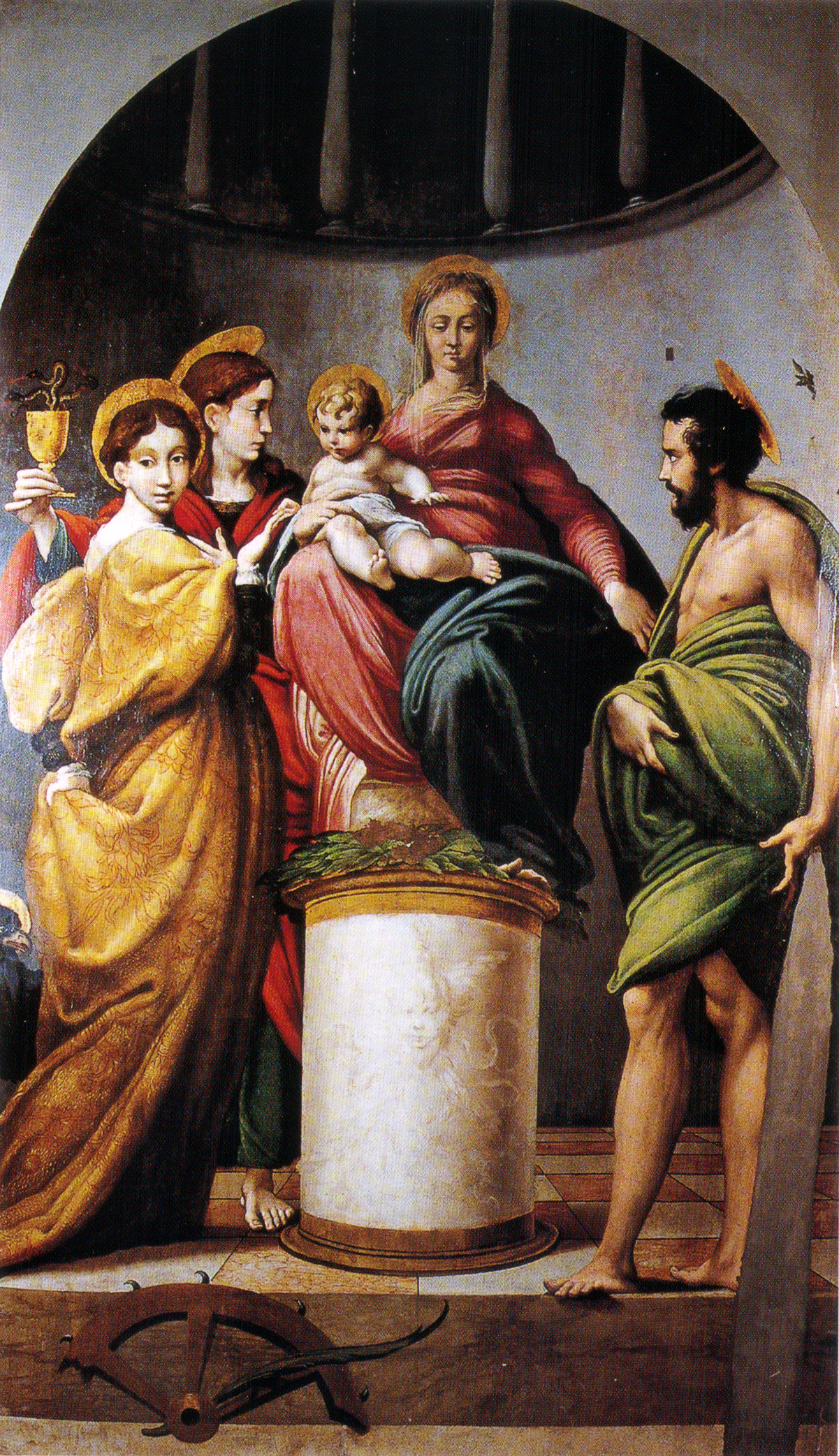
- Artist: Parmigianino
- Year: 1521
- Medium: Tempera on panel
- Dimensions: 203 cm × 130 cm (80 in × 51 in)
- Location: Chiesa di Santa Maria Addolorata (Bardi), Bardi

The Bardi Altarpiece (Italian: Pala di Bardi), is an Italian Mannerist painting by the Italian painter Parmigianino, dating from c. 1521. It is housed in the church of Santa Maria, at Bardi.

== History ==
In 1521 Parma was invaded by the imperial-papal troops under Prospero Colonna, in the course of the Italian Wars. The young Parmigianino, then seventeen, was sent by his family to Viadana to his cousin's house. According to Italian late Renaissance art biographer Giorgio Vasari, there Parmigianino painted two tempera panels: St. Francis Receiving the Stigmata (lost) and the Marriage of St. Catherine, which was placed in the church of San Pietro. The latter was stolen in 1629, during the War of Mantuan Succession, and brought to Parma. Later, in unknown circumstances, it was transferred to the current location in Bardi, a town near Parma: here, in 1860, members of the Academy of Fine Arts of Parma recognized as by Parmigianino, although the identification remained disputed until the 1930s.

== Description ==
The work depicts the mystical marriage of Saint Catherine of Alexandria, set a in a fake niche with a colonnade surmounting the background curved wall. The scheme is that of the Holy Conversation. In the middle is the Virgin sitting on a tall throne, above a historiated section of column (decorated with a barely visible putto), giving the Child to St. Catherine, on the left, who receives the symbolic marriage ring. At the sides are two saints, St. John the Evangelist (with a chalice full of snakes, a hint to his alleged miraculous discovery and healing of a poisoned drink) and St. John the Baptist, who holds his typical attribute, a tall and slim cross. Catherine's attributes are shown in the low foreground, including a broken wheel and the martyrdom palm.
