= Portrait of a Collector =

Painting by Parmigianino

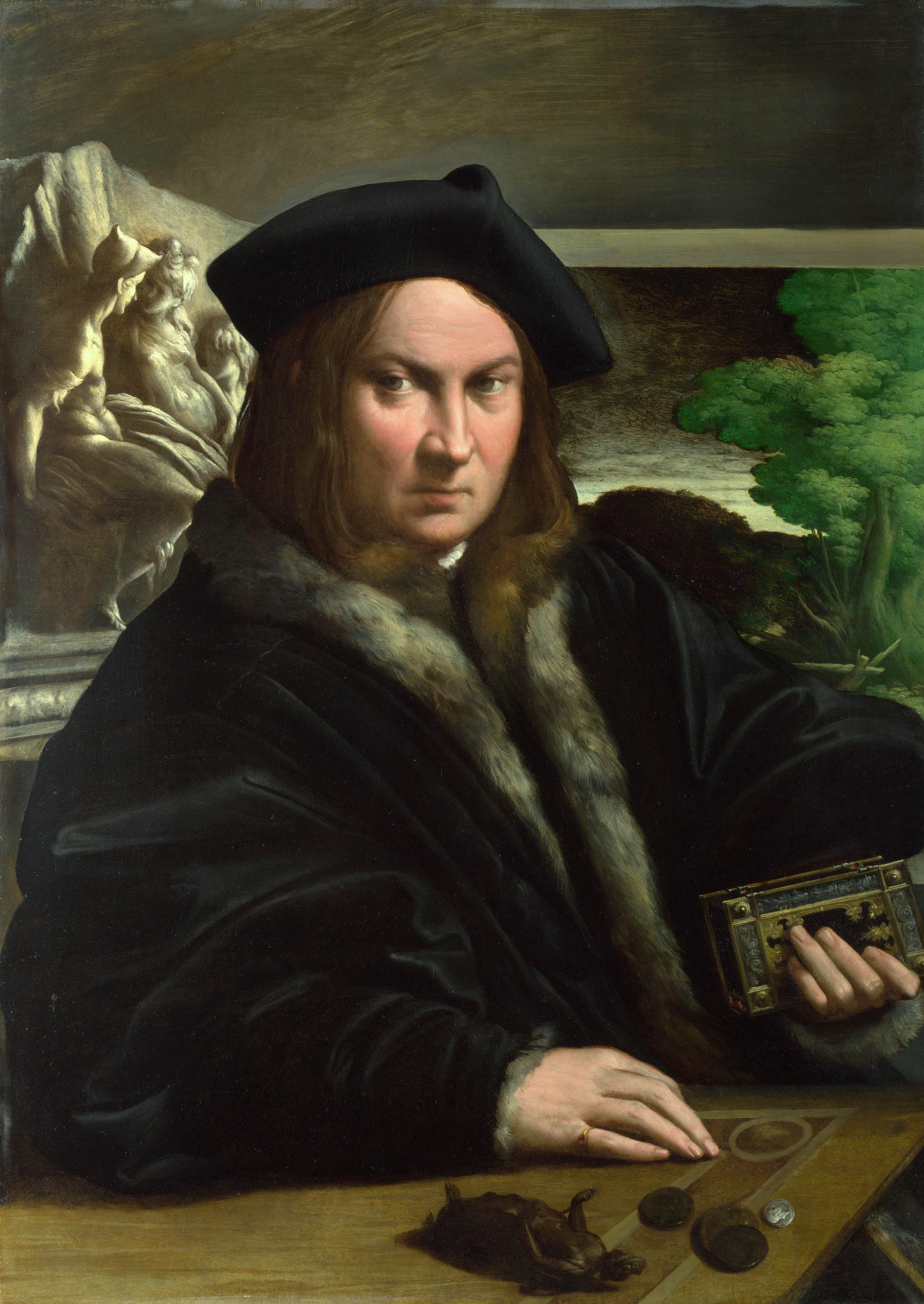
- Artist: Parmigianino
- Year: c. 1524
- Medium: Oil on panel
- Dimensions: 86 cm × 94 cm (34 in × 37 in)
- Location: National Gallery, London

Portrait of a Collector is an oil on canvas painting by the Italian Mannerist artist Parmigianino, created c. 1524. It is held at the National Gallery, in London.

== History ==
The work, together with other four attributed to Parmigianino, was listed in the "wardrobe" of Ranuccio Farnese in 1587, as a Portrait of a Priest. A more detailed description from 1670, of the works in the Palazzo del Giardino at Parma, also identifies the subject as religious man. The painting arrived in England in the early 19th century, in the collections of Lord Radstock, and was later auctioned at Christie's as Parmigianino's self-portrait. In 1857 it became part of the collections of Lord Strafford at Wrotham Park, being acquired by the National Gallery in 1977.

It was published for the first time in an art history journal in 1940, on Emporium, which assigned it to the Roman sojourn of the painter. It was later considered earlier, to c. 1524, basing on stylistic similarities with works of that period. In particular, the bas-relief is similar to that in the fresco of Sts. Lucy and Apollonia at San Giovanni Evangelista, while the portrait scheme and technique recalls the Portrait of Galeazzo Sanvitale.

There are at least two old copies of the painting, one in the Uffizi depot (inventory 3971) and one at the Walker Art Center of Minneapolis, United States.

== Description ==
The first art historian to clarify that the subject was not a priest was Freedberg, in 1950, identifying him as Francesco Baiardi. Today he is considered an unknown collector, who holds the Offiziolo Durazzo, a miniated breviary today housed in the Biblioteca Civica Berio at Genoa. This work had been executed some twenty years before the painting by Francesco Marmitta, a painter from Parma who has been erroneously considered Parmigianino's master. The man is the same appearing in a portrait in London, attributed by some to Dosso Dossi.

The subject, who is illuminated by a frontal source, wears a wide black coat lined in fur, and a hat of the same color. His left hands holds the Offiziolo, whose decorated cover is painted in the finest details; the right hands lies on the table, and has a golden ring with a precious stone at the little finger. Near it are a bronze statuette in ancient style, perhaps a female divinity (identified by some as Ceres), three bronze medals and an ancient silver coin: these objects were added as a show of the man's cultural interests. In the left background is a marble bas-relief of Mars, Cupid and Venus, a typical theme of the Platonic Academy, while on the right is a landscape.

== Sources ==
- de Castris, Pierluigi Leone (2003). Parmigianino e il manierismo europeo. Cinisello Balsamo: Silvana editoriale. pp. 236–237. ISBN 88-8215-481-5.
