= The Conversion of Saint Paul (Parmigianino) =

Painting by Parmigianino

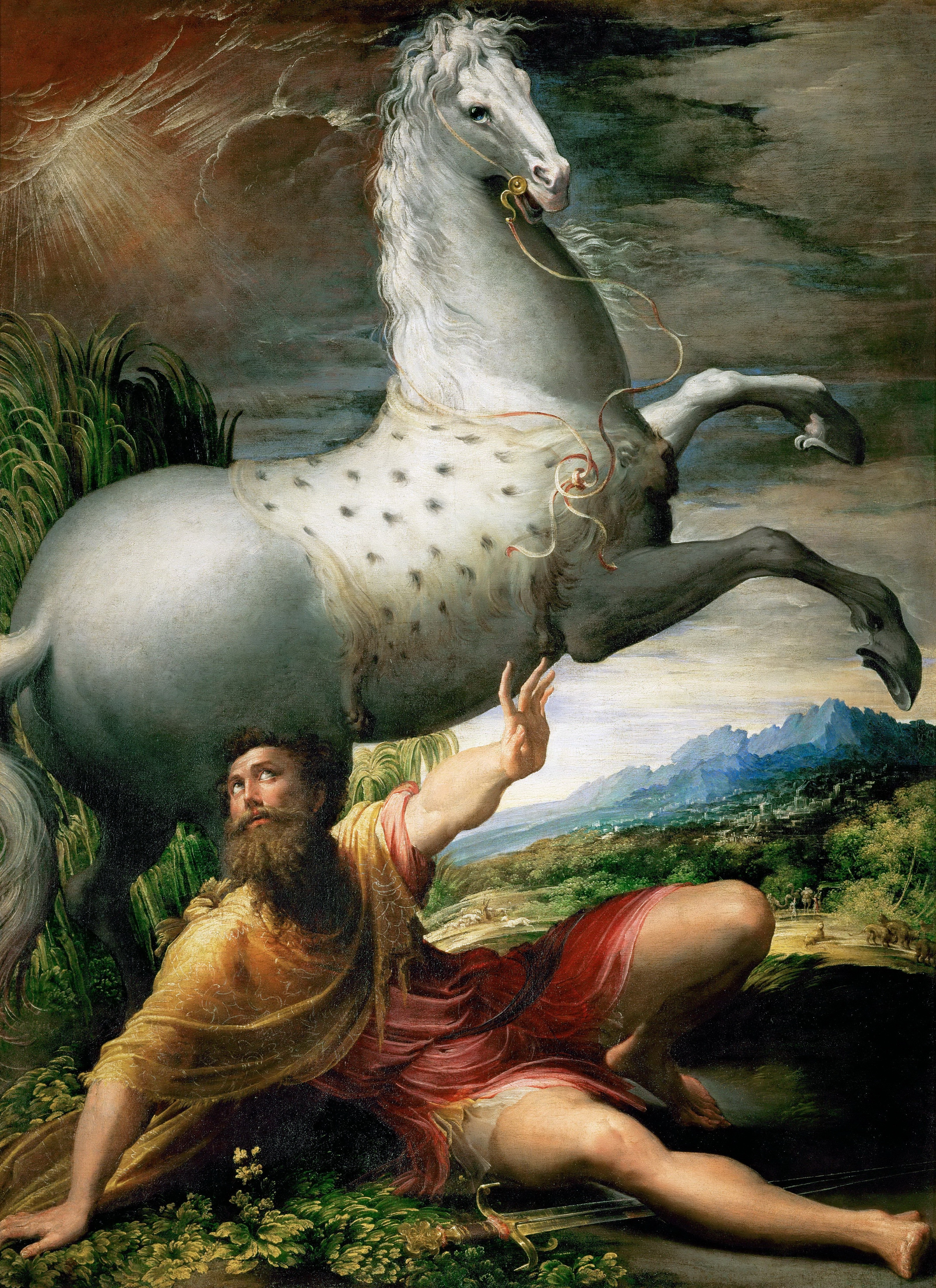
- Artist: Parmigianino
- Year: 1527
- Medium: oil on canvas
- Dimensions: 177.5 cm × 128.5 cm (69.9 in × 50.6 in)
- Location: Kunsthistorisches Museum, Vienna

The Conversion of Saint Paul is an oil painting on canvas of 1527 by Parmigianino, now in the Kunsthistorisches Museum, in Vienna.

It was seen in the house of Giovanni Andrea, a major figure in Parma, by both Giorgio Vasari (1550) and Lamo (1560). On Andrea's death in 1566 the work left Parma and is known to have been in Madrid in 1608, where it featured in the collection inventory of Pompeo Leoni. It moved to the museum in Vienna in the 18th century and was first exhibited to the public in 1912.
