= Saint Barbara (Parmigianino) =

Painting by Parmigianino

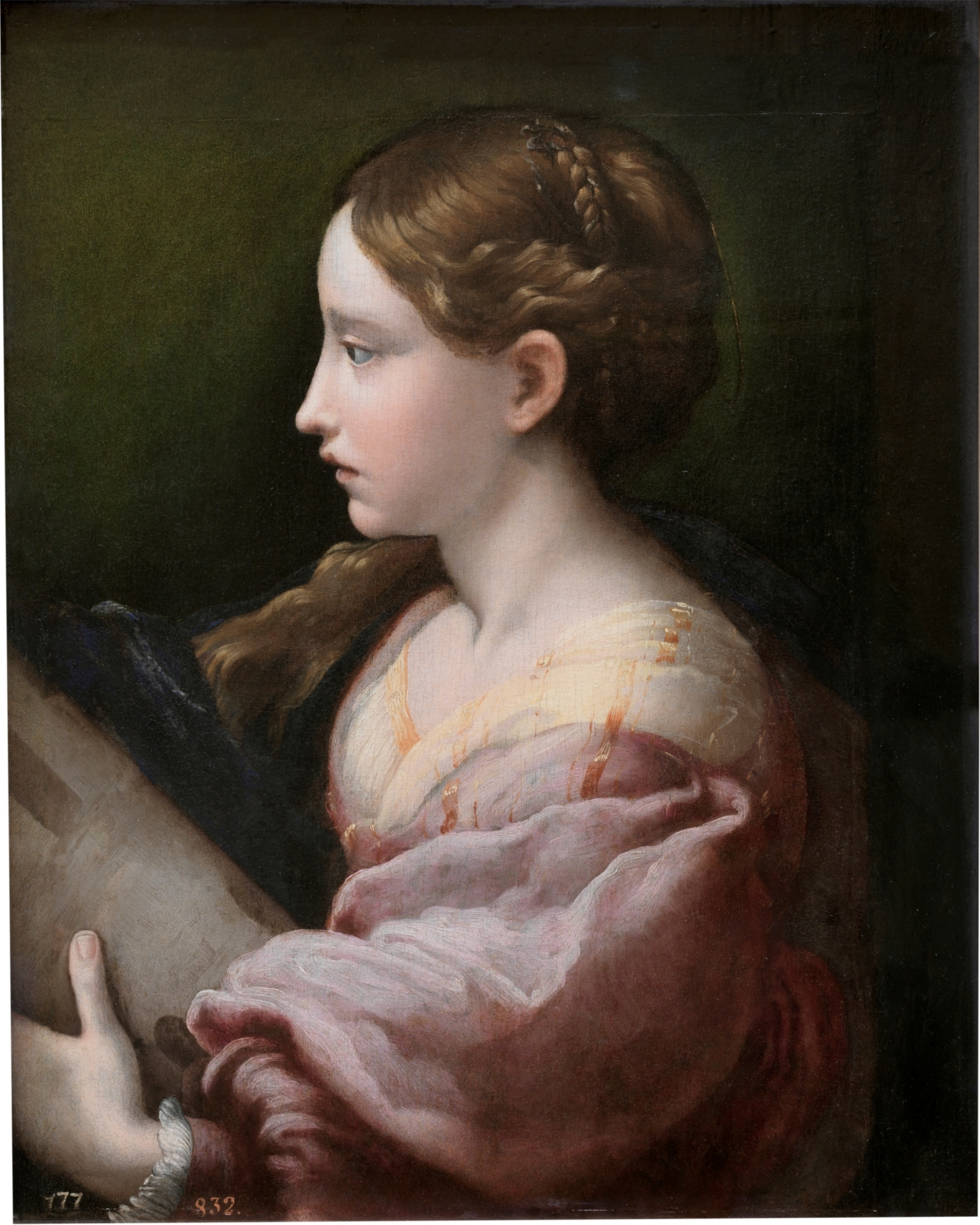
Saint Barbara (c. 1523) by Parmigianino

Saint Barbara is an oil on panel painting by the Italian Mannerist painter Parmigianino, created c. 1523. It is in the Museo del Prado in Madrid. Copies of it are in the Mauritshuis (inv. 354), Pomona College and Chatsworth House (inv. 508).

The painting arrived in Spain in 1686, when it was recorded in the real Alcázar di Madrid, and from 1746 in the Royal Palace of La Granja de San Ildefonso.

== History ==
It is probably the Saint Barbara acquired in 1624 with other works by princess Giulia d'Este for cardinal Alessandro d'Este and recorded in 1662 in the Muselli collection in Verona, the latter work being reported as "to my taste [one] of the most beautiful paintings by Parmigianino [...] by an arm's length".
