= Francesco Borgani =

Italian painter

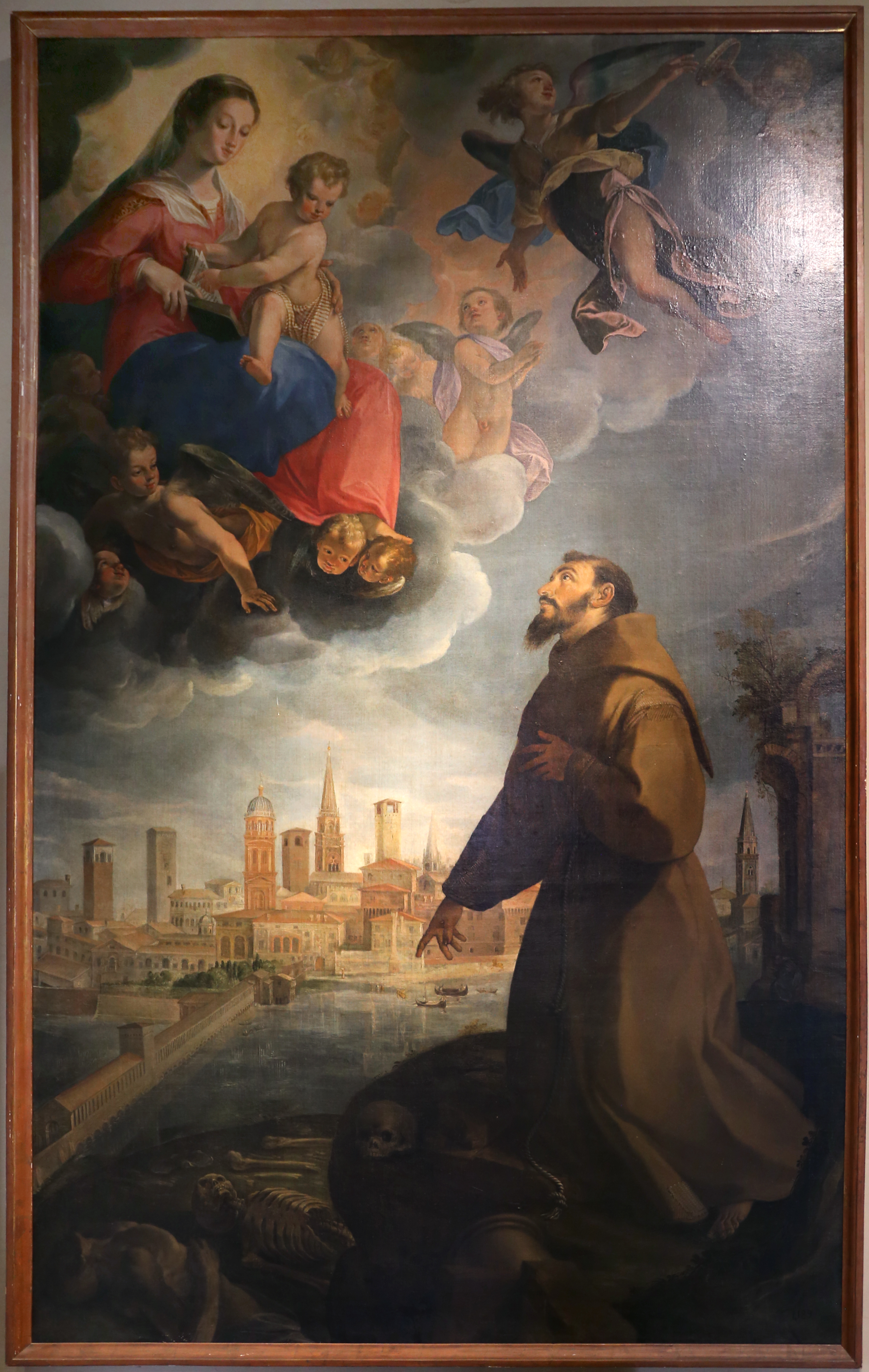
Saint Francis intercedes for the city of Mantua, palazzo Ducale, Mantua

Francesco Borgani (1587–1624) was an Italian painter of the Baroque, mainly active in Mantua.

He was a pupil of Ippolito Costa and influenced by his contemporary Domenico Fetti. He was employed by the court of the Duke Vincenzo I Gonzaga. The painting of St. Francis intercedes with the Virgin to liberate Mantua from the plague of 1630 for the church of Santa Agnese, but now in the Ducal Palace of Mantua, was attributed to him, but given the date of demise that seems unlikely. He painted for the churches of San Pietro, San Simone, and Santa Croce at Mantua.
