= Casalmaggiore Madonna =

Painting by Correggio

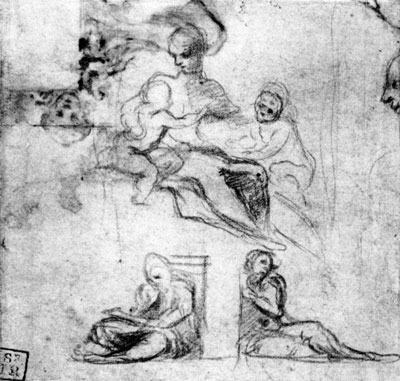
Preparatory sketch (British Museum)

The Casalmaggiore Madonna is a lost oil-on-canvas painting by the Italian Renaissance painter Correggio, measuring 28 by 24 cm and painted around 1522.

== History ==
A copy in Frankfurt (in poor condition and probably transferred from canvas to panel) and a preparatory sketch are the only evidence of the work. The sketch is on the back of a sheet of designs for a fresco at the San Giovanni Evangelista church in Parma, dating the Casalmaggiore Madonna commission to November 1522.

The painting showed the Madonna and Child with an infant St John the Baptist, a motif revisited several times by Correggio] from his youth (in Madonna and Child with the Infant John the Baptist for example) onwards.

The Frankfurt work has divided critics – some see it as a copy of a lost original and others as an autograph work by Correggio in poor condition which may have entered the Galleria Estense when Francesco I occupied Casalmaggiore in1646.

== Bibliography ==
- Giuseppe Adani, Correggio pittore universale, Silvana Editoriale, Correggio 2007. ISBN 9788836609772
