= Holy Family with the Infant Saint John the Baptist (Parmigianino) =

Painting by Parmigianino

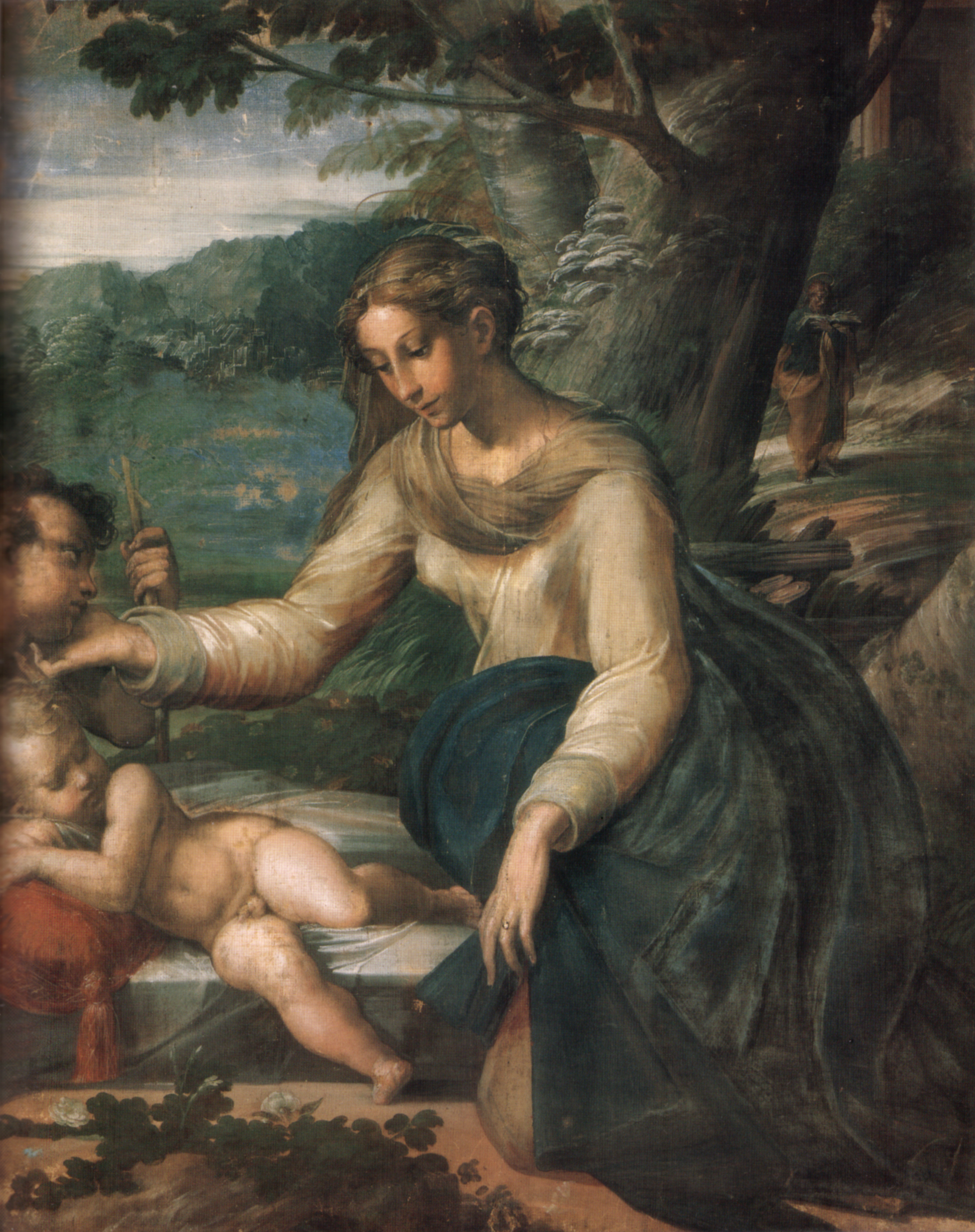
Holy Family with the Infant Saint John the Baptist (c. 1528) by Parmigianino

Holy Family with the Infant Saint John the Baptist is a painting by the Italian painter Parmigianino, executed c. 1528. It was in the Palazzo Farnese in Rome until 1662, when it moved to Parma. There it hung in the Palazzo del Giardino and later in the Galleria Ducale – the 'Descrizione' of the latter in 1725 called it one of the finest works on display there. It and the rest of the Farnese collection were later moved to Naples and the work was exhibited for a few years in the Palazzo Reale before moving to its present home in the National Museum of Capodimonte. Two early copies remain in the Galleria Nazionale and Palazzo Comunale in Parma.

Its attribution to Parmigianino is almost undisputed, though its dating is more debated – some scholars place it in his period in Rome (1524–1527) and others to his time in Bologna (1527–1530), whilst Freedberg argues it belonged to a second stay in Parma (1530–1539). Its technique and style probably date it to his time in Bologna – the mineral colours are typical of work in fresco and the work is in glue tempera or gouache. Vasari records Parmigianino painting two works in gouache in Bologna "for Master Luca di Leuti".

Four preparatory drawings for the work survive (one each) in the Royal Collection at Windsor Castle (RCIN 990346), the Galleria nazionale di Parma (inv. 510/5), the British Museum (1905,1110.18) and the Ashmolean Museum (inv. 446). It is his most classical and Raphaelesque work, drawing on his Madonna with the Blue Diadem. It shows a scene on the Flight into Egypt.

== Bibliography ==
- (in Italian) Mario Di Giampaolo and Elisabetta Fadda, Parmigianino, Keybook, Santarcangelo di Romagna 2002. ISBN 8818-02236-9
