= Antea (Parmigianino) =

Painting by Parmigianino

Antea (Portrait of a Young Woman)
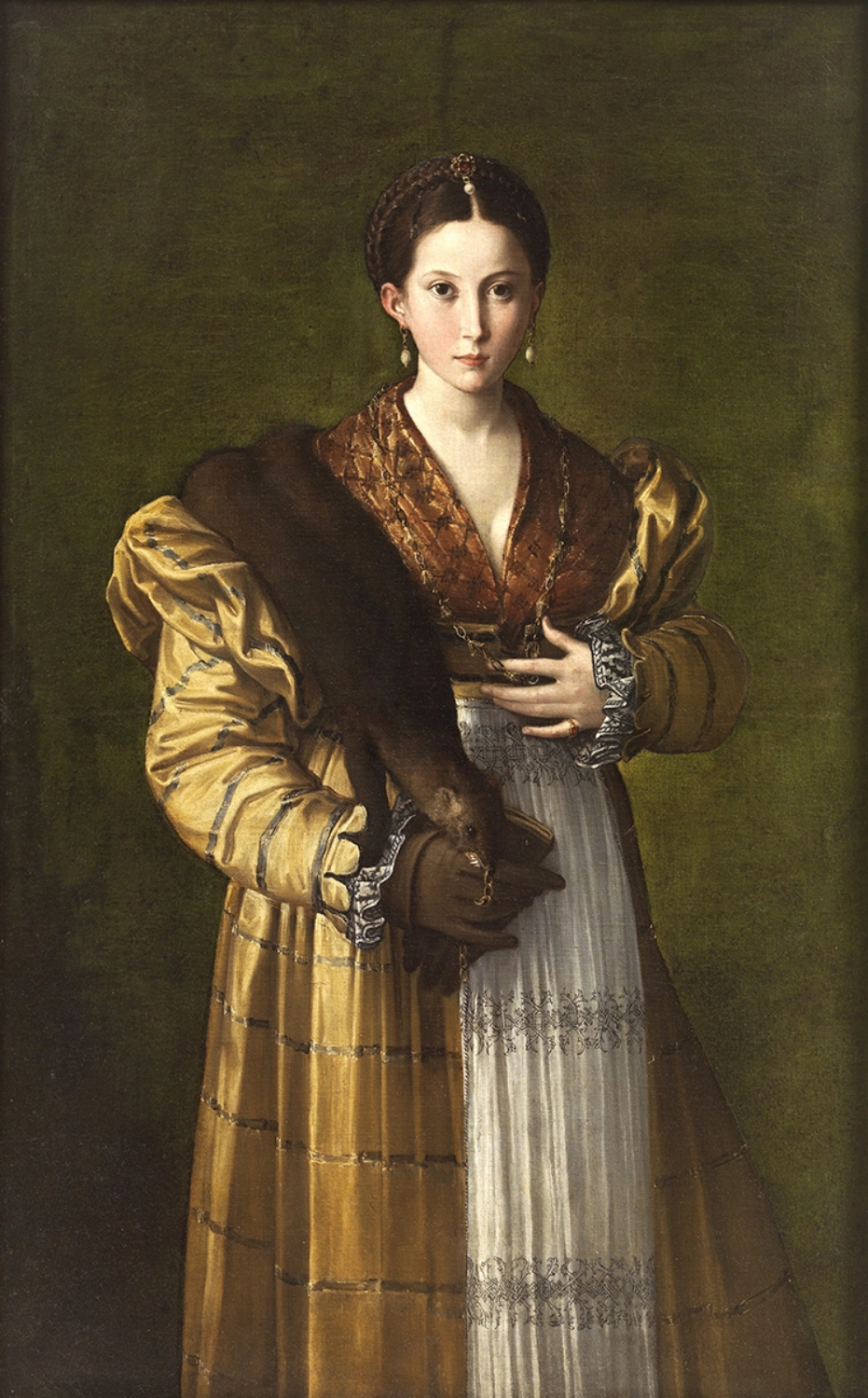
- Artist: Parmigianino
- Year: c. 1535
- Medium: Oil on canvas
- Dimensions: 136 cm × 86 cm (54 in × 34 in)
- Location: National Museum of Capodimonte, Naples

Antea (also known as Portrait of a Young Woman) is a portrait painting by the Italian Mannerist artist Parmigianino. The painting is in the collection of the Museum of Capodimonte in Naples.

== History ==
The work is mentioned in 1671 as part of the Farnese collections in the Palazzo del Giardino. In the late 17th century, the painting was moved to the Ducal Gallery in the Palazzo della Pilotta in Parma. It has been in Naples since 1734, aside from a short period in 1816-1817 at Palermo. During World War II it was moved to Montecassino, where it was stolen by the occupying German forces and brought to Berlin, and then to the Austrian salt mines of Altaussee, from where it returned to Italy in 1945.

== The sitter ==
The subject of the painting remains a mystery. In 1671, Giacomo Barri, an artist and writer, identified the woman as "Antea", a famous 16th-century Roman courtesan, who he stated was the artist's mistress. This identification has long been contested. Studies of the woman's garments, a mix of luxury and popular elements, have led to the hypothesis that she could be either the artist's daughter, a lover, a servant of Parmigianino, Pellegrina Rossi di San Secondo or another unknown noblewoman of Parma. Her dress - the zinale, a light white apron covering the young woman's stomach - suggests she may have been a bride from northern Italy. The zinale was traditionally worn by young brides on their wedding day as a symbol of their virginity. It is possible that the sitter was also the model for Parmigianino's final work, the Madonna with the Long Neck (Uffizi, Florence).

Art historian Elizabeth Cropper has written about the painting in the context of the extensive Italian Renaissance discourse on the specific traits and qualities of ideal female beauty.

== Cultural references ==
The painting is recreated in the Gilmore Girls episode "The Festival of Living Art", where Rory Gilmore portrays the subject of the painting.

The painting is referred to in Elizabeth Daly's book Nothing Can Rescue Me: Henry Gamadge #6 as an excellent portrait of the character, Corinne Hutter.

== Sources ==
- de Castris, Pierluigi Leone (2003). Parmigianino e il manierismo europeo. Cinisello Balsamo: Silvana editoriale. pp. 236–237. ISBN 88-8215-481-5.
