= Vision of Saint Jerome =

Painting by Parmigianino

The Vision of Saint Jerome
- The Madonna and Child with Saints
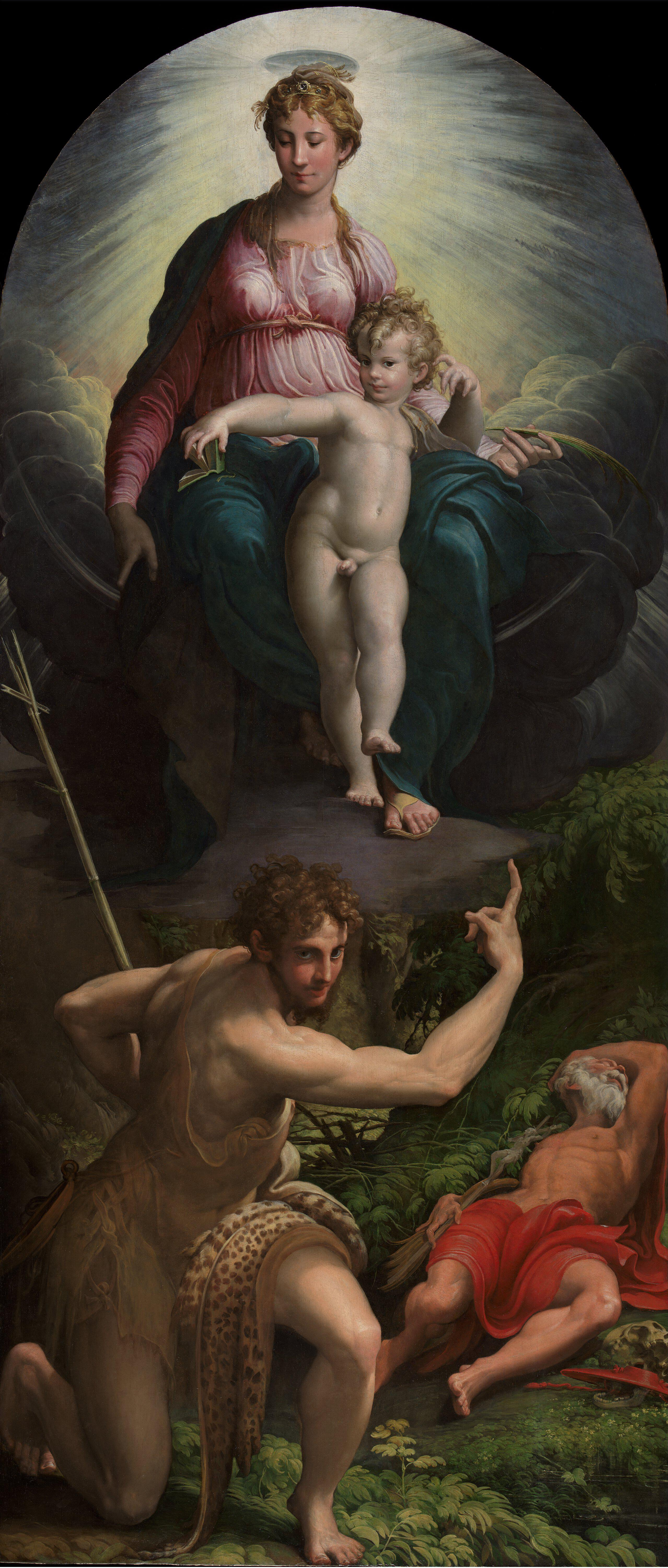
- Artist: Parmigianino
- Year: 1526–1527
- Medium: Oil on panel
- Dimensions: 343 cm × 149 cm (135 in × 59 in)
- Location: National Gallery, London

The Vision of Saint Jerome of The Madonna and Child with Saints is a painting by the Italian Mannerist artist Parmigianino, executed in 1526–1527. It is in the collection of the National Gallery, in London.

== History ==
The work was commissioned on 3 January 1526 in Rome, by Maria Bufalini, wife of Antonio Caccialupi, to decorate the family chapel in the church of San Salvatore in Lauro. The contract mentioned "Francesco Mazola de Parma" and one "Pietro" with the same name, perhaps Parmigianino's uncle Piero Ilario Mazzola. The elongated shape derives from its original destination as part of a triptych, the side panels (never painted) of which would have represented The Immaculate Conception (to which the chapel was dedicated) and the Saints Joachim and Anna.

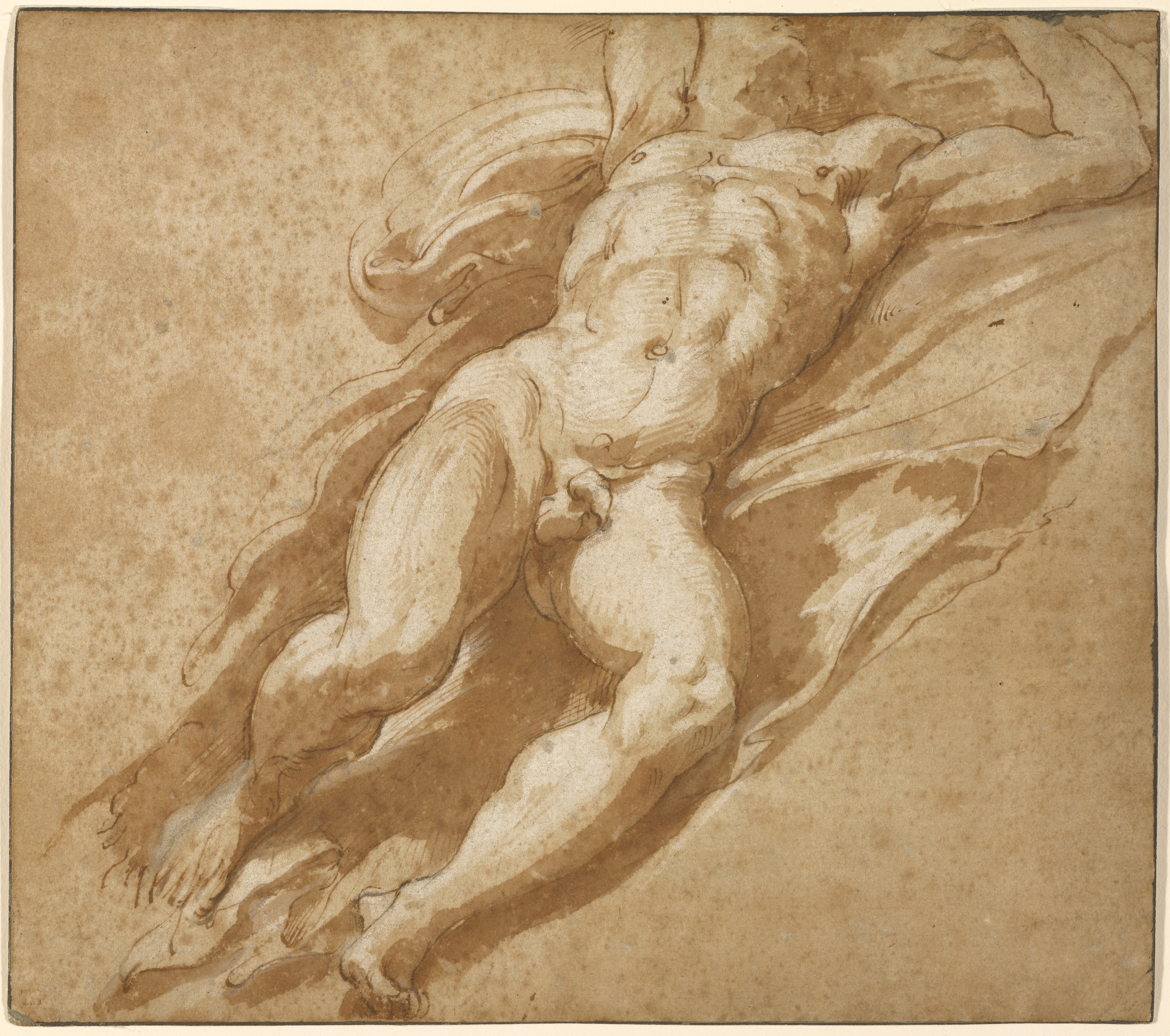
Figure study for the Vision of St. Jerome, Getty Center

According to late Renaissance art biographer Giorgio Vasari, Parmigianino was working on this painting during the Sack of Rome when imperial troops burst into his workshop but "seeing him [and] stupefied at this work" they let him pursue it. He was able to escape Rome by paying a ransom. His uncle in Rome was able to hide the painting in the refectory of Santa Maria della Pace.

In 1558 the Bufalini family decided to move the painting to their chapel in Sant'Agostino in Città di Castello. The painting was acquired in 1790 by the English painter James Durno who brought it to England. There it was subsequently sold to the Marquess of Albercon for 1,500 guineas. After a number of further sales, the painting was acquired by the National Gallery in 1826.

There are about 20 drawings in various museums such as the Musée Condé, the British Museum and the Getty Center that appear to be made in preparation of the picture. A drawing in the Galleria nazionale di Parma is the one which is the nearest to the final version, although it adopts a horizontal composition.

== Description ==
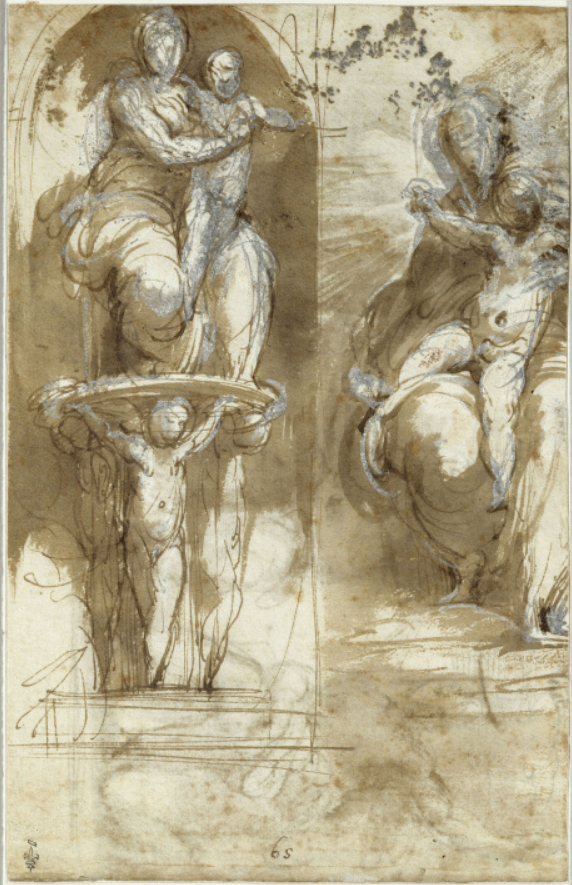
Two studies of the Virgin and Child, Musée Condé

The composition is painted on a long and narrow panel. On the lower right of the painting, an old man is sleeping near a crucifix. He can be identified as Saint Jerome by his traditional symbols, i.e. the cardinal hat and a skull. The saint's pose may have been intended as an homage to Parmigianino's elder fellow artist Correggio, who was also based in Parma. Correggio's Venus and Cupid with a Satyr (Louvre} may have inspired St Jerome's pose with his feet forward, head tilted backwards and his body at once vertical and horizontal. In Correggio's painting, the naked love goddess Venus is sleeping in the same pose as Jerome, seen from the same sharp angle, her feet towards the picture plane and her body vertical on the canvas.

The foreground of the picture is dominated by St. John the Baptist, identified by the long cross and the baptismal wash basin tied at his belt. While staring intently at the viewer his exaggeratedly long finger points backwards and upwards to the Virgin and Child, who are seated in a burst of light against dark grey storm clouds. St. John's raised right arm and upwards-pointing finger are reminiscent of Leonardo's painting St. John the Baptist. The Virgin sits on the crescent moon in a burst of silvery cosmic light. From preparatory studies for the work it appears that the figure of the Virgin may have been derived from a female nude, possibly a classical sculpture. Her nipples are visible under her rose garment. The Child Jesus is not held by his mother but is standing leaning against her lap. He is looking at the viewer while mischievously kicking his foot out of the painting.

Parmigianino's attention to detail is shown by the Baptist's reed cross, the speckled skin which covers him, the undergrowth near the sleeping Jerome, and the sheen on Mary's dress, the last perhaps inspired by classical sculptures seen by Parmigianino during his trips. The painting shows the characteristics of the Mannerist style of which he was one of the exponents. This is reflected in the elongated fingers of Saints John and Jerome and their contorted poses.

== External sources ==
- Media related to Vision of St Jerome by Parmigianino at Wikimedia Commons
