= Parmigianino =

Italian Mannerist painter and printmaker (1503–1540)

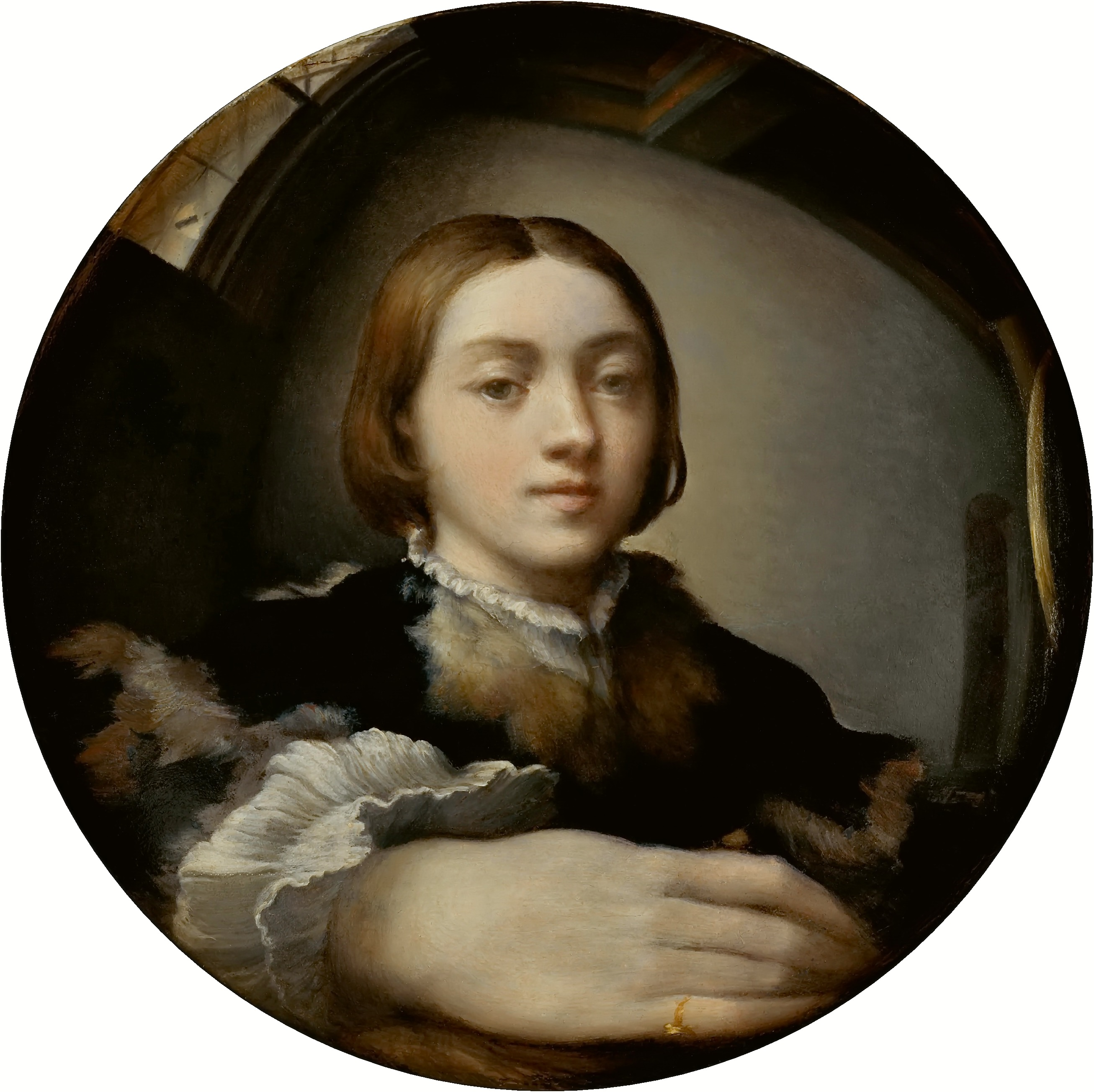
- Self-portrait in a Convex Mirror (c. 1524, age about 21), Kunsthistorisches Museum, Vienna
- Born: Girolamo Francesco Maria Mazzola; 11 January 1503; Parma, Duchy of Milan
- Died: 24 August 1540 (aged 37); Casalmaggiore, Republic of Venice
- Known for: Painting, etching
- Notable work: Self-portrait in a Convex Mirror; Vision of Saint Jerome; Madonna with the Long Neck
- Movement: Mannerist

Girolamo Francesco Maria Mazzola (11 January 1503 – 24 August 1540), also known as Francesco Mazzola or, more commonly, as Parmigianino (UK: /ˌpɑːrmɪdʒæˈniːnoʊ/, US: /-dʒɑːˈ-/, Italian: [parmidʒaˈniːno]; "the little one from Parma"), was an Italian Mannerist painter and printmaker active in Florence, Rome, Bologna, and his native city of Parma. His work is characterized by a "refined sensuality" and often elongation of forms and includes Vision of Saint Jerome (1527) and the iconic if somewhat anomalous Madonna with the Long Neck (1534), and he remains the best-known artist of the first generation whose whole career falls into the Mannerist period.

His prodigious and individual talent has always been recognised, but his career was disrupted by war, especially the Sack of Rome in 1527, three years after he moved there, and then ended by his death at 37. He produced outstanding drawings and was one of the first Italian painters to experiment with printmaking himself. While his portable works have always been keenly collected and are now in major museums in Italy and around the world, his two large projects in fresco are in a church in Parma and a palace in a small town nearby. This, in conjunction with their lack of large main subjects, has resulted in their being less well known than other works by similar artists. He painted a number of important portraits, leading a trend in Italy towards the three-quarters or full-length figure, previously mostly reserved for royalty.

== Early years ==
Parmigianino was the eighth child of Filippo Mazzola and one Donatella Abbati. His father died of the plague two years after Parmigianino's birth, and the children were raised by their uncles, Michele and Pier Ilario, who, according to Vasari, were modestly talented artists. In 1515, his uncle received a commission from Nicolò Zangrandi for the decoration of a chapel in San Giovanni Evangelista; a work later completed by a young Parmigianino. By the age of eighteen, he had already completed the Bardi Altarpiece. In 1521, Parmigianino was sent to Viadana (along with painter Girolamo Bedoli, who was to marry his cousin) to escape the wars between the French, Imperial, and papal armies. In Viadana, he painted two panels in tempera, depicting Saint Francis for the church of the Frati de' Zoccoli, and the Mystical Marriage of Saint Catherine for San Pietro. He also worked in San Giovanni and met Correggio, who was at work on the fresco decorations of the cupola.

== Work in Fontanellato and travel to Rome ==
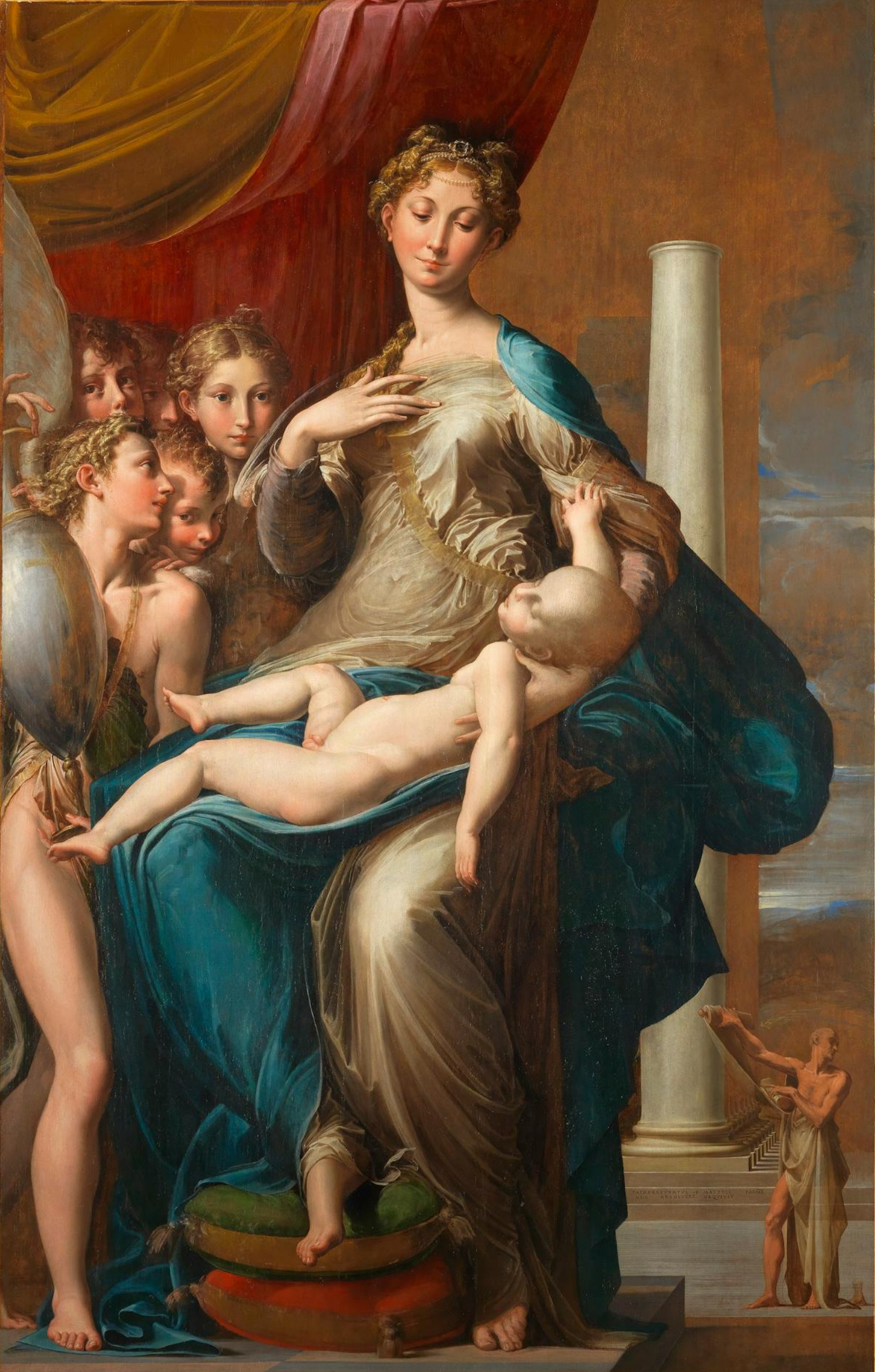
Madonna with the Long Neck (1535–1540)

In 1524, he travelled to Rome with five small paintings, including the Circumcision of Jesus and his Self-portrait in a Convex Mirror, seeking patronage of the Medici pope, Clement VII. Vasari records that in Rome, Parmigianino was "celebrated as a Raphael reborn". In January 1526, Parmigianino and his uncle, Pier Ilario, agreed with Maria Bufalina from Città di Castello to decorate the church of San Salvatore in Lauro with an altarpiece of the Vision of Saint Jerome (1526–27, National Gallery, London). Within a year, the Sack of Rome caused Parmigianino and many other artists to flee.

== Bologna and return to Parma ==
He resided in Bologna for nearly three years. At around 1528, he painted the Madonna and Child with Saints (Pinacoteca, Bologna), then later in 1528, he painted Madonna con la Rosa (Dresden) and Madonna with Saint Zachariah (Uffizi). By 1530, Parmigianino had returned to Parma.

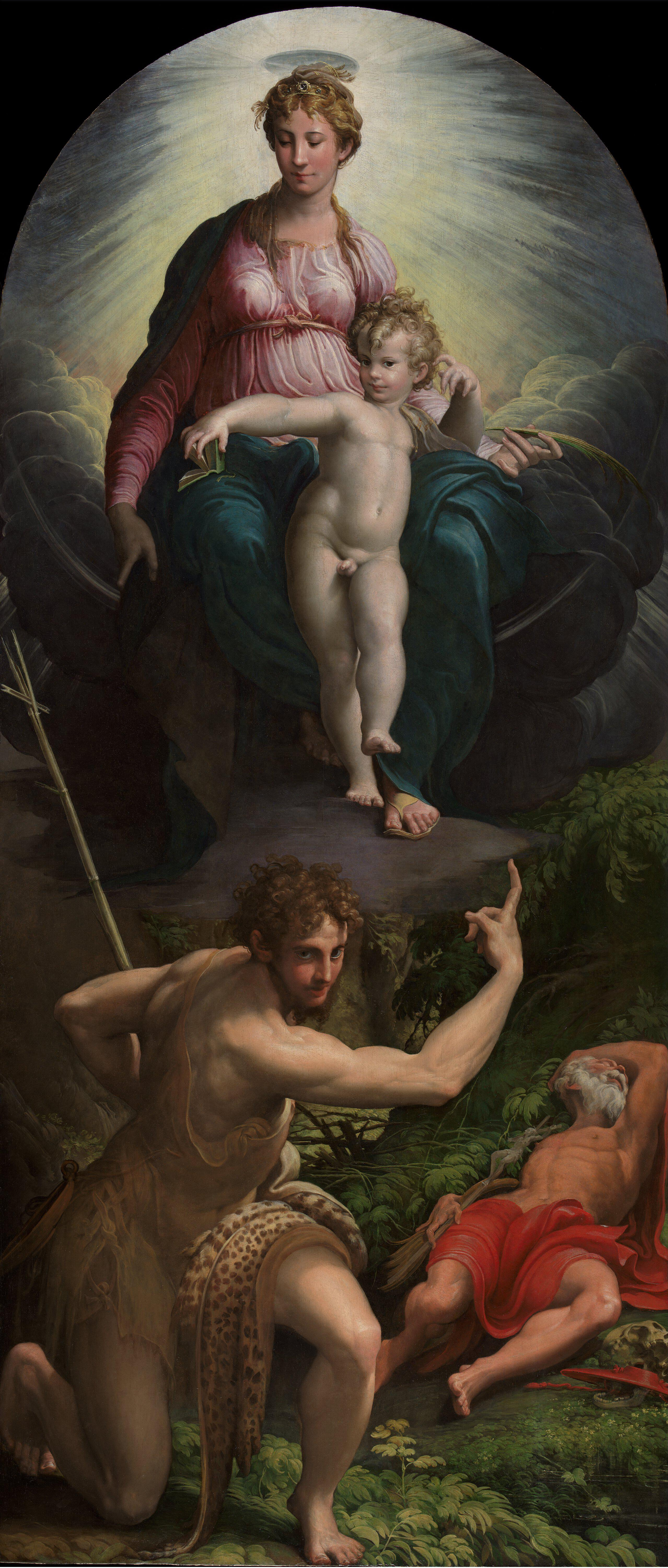
Vision of Saint Jerome (1526–1527)

In 1531, Parmigianino received a commission for two altarpieces, depicting Saint Joseph and Saint John the Baptist, from the unfinished church of Santa Maria della Steccata. The brotherhood overseeing the church advanced him a salary and promised him the supplies and materials; however, by 1535, the project was unfinished. In December, he nominated Don Nicola Cassola, a Parman cleric at the Roman Curia, to act as his legal representative. Parmigianino authorized him to collect the 50 gold scudi from Bonifazio Gozzadini for the Madonna with St. John the Baptist and St. Zacharias.

In 1534, it was decided that the Madonna dal collo lungo (the Madonna with the Long Neck) would hang in the chapel of the family of Elena Baiardi.

Parmigianino had probably expected to succeed Correggio in the favour of the church. However, in April 1538, the administrative offices commissioned initially Giorgio Gandini del Grano, then Girolamo Bedoli, to decorate the apse and choir of the Parma Cathedral.

It is believed that at this time, he became a devotee of alchemy. Vasari hypothesizes that this was due to his fascination with magic. Scholars now agree that Parmigianino's scientific interests may have been due to his obsession with trying to find a new medium for his etchings. As a result of his alchemical researches, he completed little work in the church. He was imprisoned for two months for breach of contract after the Confraternita decided unanimously to ban him from continuing in their church. He was replaced between 1539 and 1540 by Giulio Romano, who also promptly withdrew from the contract.

Parmigianino died of a fever in Casalmaggiore on 24 August 1540 at the age of 37 years. He was buried in the church of the Servite Friars, "naked with a cross made of cypress wood on his chest".

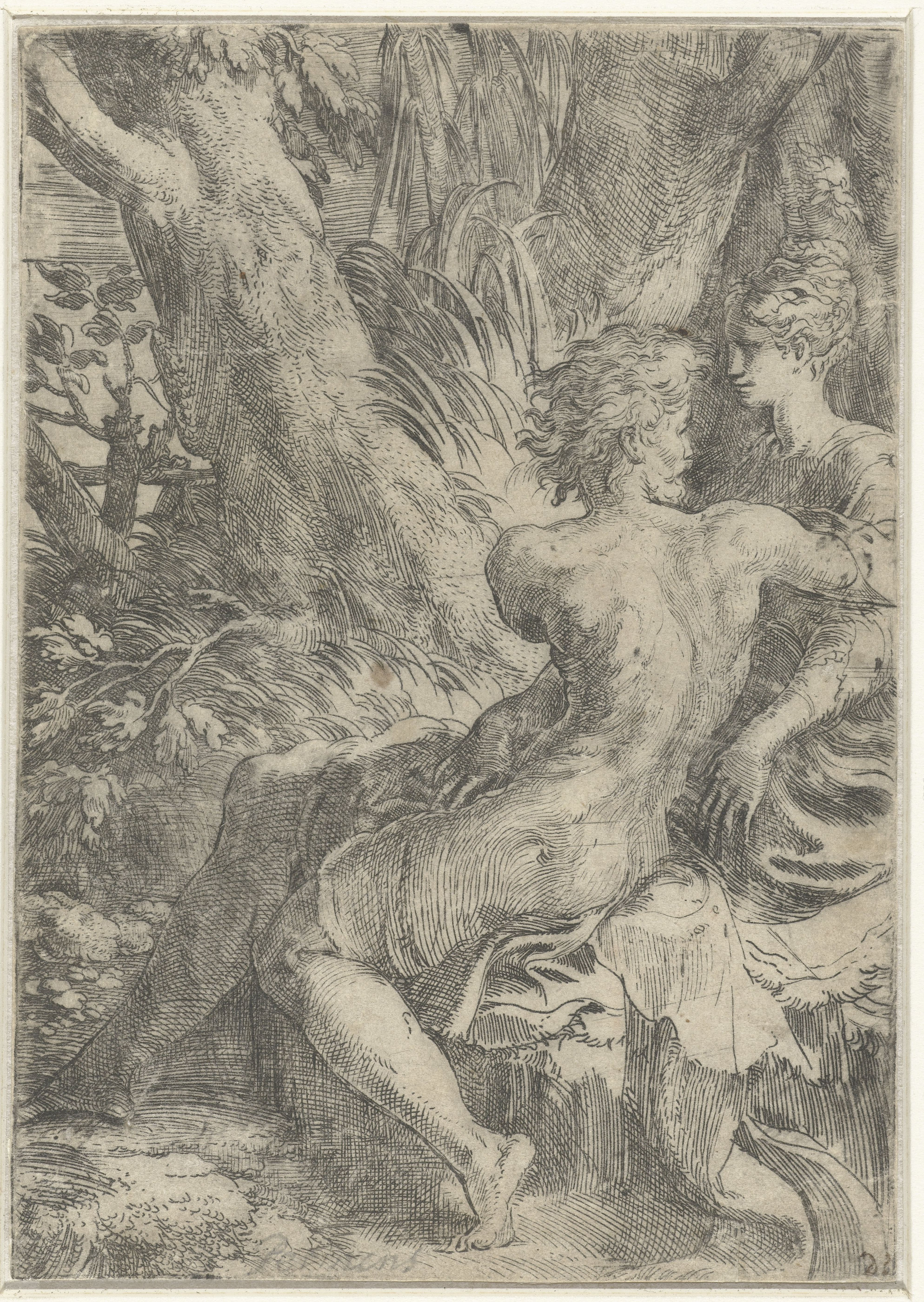
Lovers (etching and engraving)

Among those closely influenced by Parmigianino were his cousin Girolamo Bedoli and Girolamo's son Alessandro Mazzola; Pomponeo Amidano; Giacomo Bertoia; and Francesco Borgani.

== Printmaker ==
Parmigianino was a pioneer of Italian etching, a technique that was pioneered in Italy by Marcantonio Raimondi, but which appealed to draughtsmen. Though the techniques of printing the copper plates required special skills, the ease with which acid, as a substitute for ink, could reproduce the spontaneity of an artist's hand attracted Parmigianino, a "master of elegant figure drawing". He also designed chiaroscuro woodcuts, which were cut by other artists. While his print output was small, he had a considerable influence on Italian printmaking. Some of his prints were executed in collaboration with Giovanni Jacopo Caraglio.

He made his etchings and chiaroscuro prints between 1527 and 1530, while he was in Bologna. For the seven chiaroscuro prints after his designs, he collaborated with the blockcutters Ugo da Carpi and Antonio da Trento. The number of etchings attributed directly to Parmigianino has fluctuated over time, ranging from as few as six to, most recently, eighteen (Jenkins 2026). In early states, he etched with his characteristic draftsman’s line, adding hatching, whereas in later states he often combined all three techniques of engraving, drypoint and etching. Parmigianino employed needles and burins of varying thickness, burnishers and double biting to vary the width and depth of his strokes, as can be seen in Astrology (ca. 1527-1530).

== Selected works ==
- Baptism of Christ (c. 1519) – Oil on wood, 197 x 137 cm – Gemäldegalerie, Berlin
- Bardi Altarpiece (1521) – Tempera on panel, 203 x 130 cm; Church of Santa Maria, Bardi
- Saint Barbara (1522) – Oil on wood, 48 x 39 cm – Prado Museum, Madrid
- Circumcision of Jesus (c. 1523) – Oil on wood, 42 x 31.4 cm; Detroit Institute of Arts

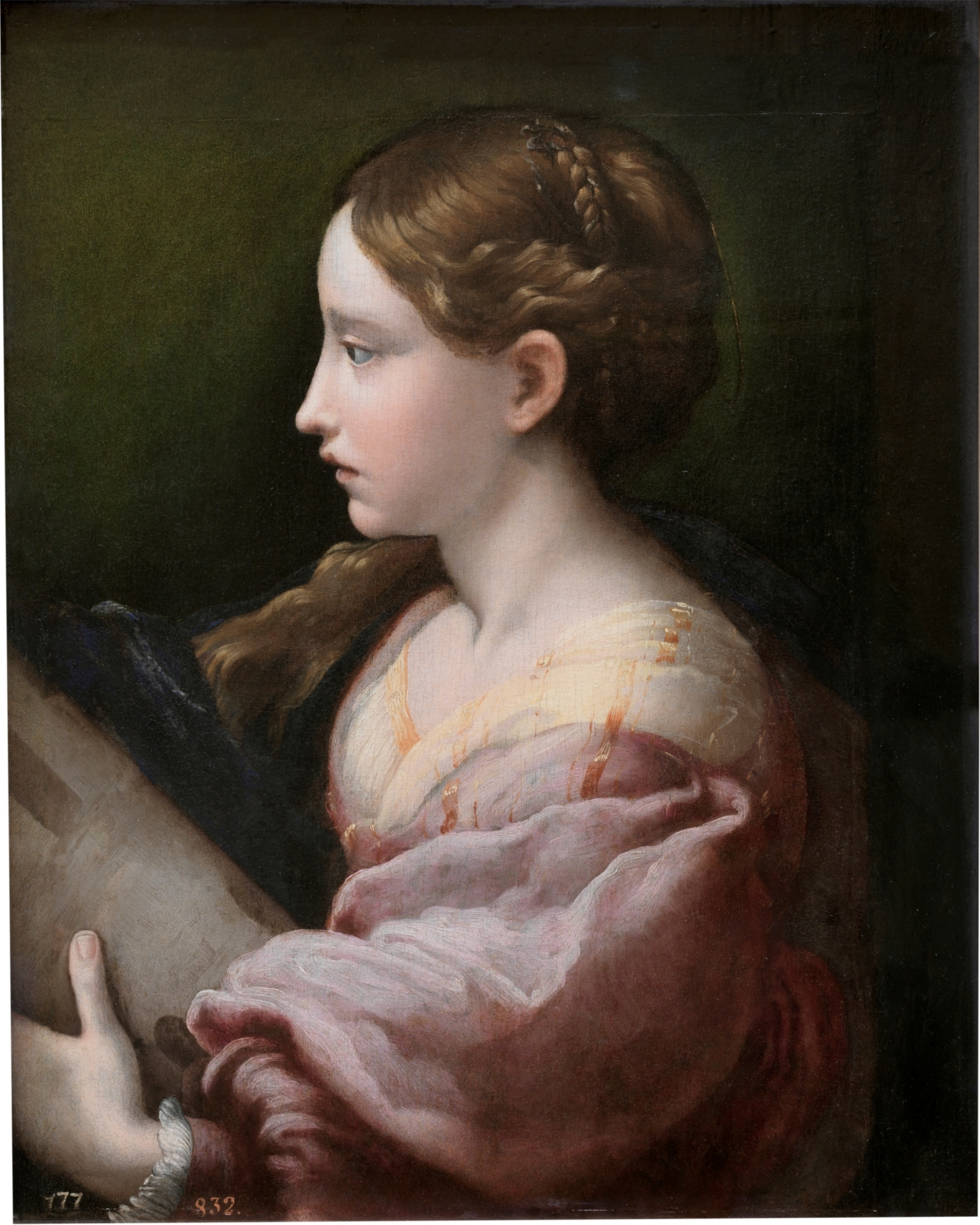
Saint Barbara (c. 1522)

- Self-portrait in a Convex Mirror (c. 1524) – Oil on wood, diameter 24.4 cm; Kunsthistorisches Museum, Vienna
- Portrait of a Collector (c. 1524) – Oil on panel, 86 x 94 cm, National Gallery, London
- Portrait of Galeazzo Sanvitale (1524) – Oil on panel, 109 x 81 cm, Museo di Capodimonte, Naples
- Portrait of Lorenzo Cybo (1524) – Oil on panel, 126 x 104 cm, Statens Museum for Kunst, Copenhagen
- Myth of Diana and Acteon (c. 1524) – Fresco, Rocca Sanvitale, Fontanellato, Province of Parma
- The Holy Family with Angels (c. 1524) – Oil on panel, 110 x 89 cm, Prado Museum, Madrid
- Antea (c. 1524–1527) – Oil on canvas, 135 x 88 cm, Museo di Capodimonte, Naples
- Madonna and Child (1525) – Galleria Doria-Pamphili, Rome
- Vision of Saint Jerome (1526–1527) – Oil on panel, 343 x 149 cm, National Gallery, London
- Conversion of Saint Paul (c. 1527) – Oil on canvas, 177.5 x 128.5 cm, Kunsthistorisches Museum, Vienna
- Holy Family with the Infant Saint John the Baptist (c. 1528) – Museo di Capodimonte, Naples
- The Mystical Marriage of St Catherine (1529) – Oil on panel, 74.2 x 57.2 cm, National Gallery, London
- Madonna of the Rose (1530) – Oil on panel, 109 x 88.5 cm, Gemäldegalerie, Dresden
- Madonna with Child and a monk (c. 1530) – Oil on Poplar wood, 27.3 x 21.6 cm, Alte Pinakothek, Munich
- Turkish Slave (Portrait of a Lady; c. 1533) – Oil on panel, 67 x 53 cm, Galleria Nazionale di Parma
- Cupid Making His Arch (c. 1533–1535) – Oil on panel, 135 x 65.3 cm, Kunsthistorisches Museum, Vienna
- Madonna with the Long Neck (1534–1540) – Oil on wood, 216 x 132 cm, Uffizi, Florence
- Portrait of Pier Maria Rossi di San Secondo (c. 1535–1539) – Oil on panel, 133 x 98 cm, Prado Museum, Madrid
- Virgin and Child with Saint John the Baptist and Mary Magdalene (c. 1535–1540) – Oil on panel, 75.9 × 59.7cm, J. Paul Getty Museum, Los Angeles
- Portrait of Camilla Gonzaga and Her Three Sons (c. 1539–1540) – Oil on panel, 128 x 97 cm, Prado Museum, Madrid
- Casalmaggiore Altarpiece, Madonna with Child, St Stephen and St John (1540) – Oil on panel, 253 cm × 161 cm, Gemäldegalerie, Dresden

== See also ==
- Self-portrait in a Convex Mirror (poetry collection)

== Sources ==
- Hartt, Frederick, History of Italian Renaissance Art, (2nd edn.)1987, Thames & Hudson (US Harry N Abrams), ISBN 0500235104
- Parmigianino, Cecil Gould. ISBN 1-55859-892-8
- Parmigianino: The Paintings, Mary Vaccaro. ISBN 88-422-1131-1
- Parmigianino: The Drawings, Sylvie Beguin et al. ISBN 88-422-1020-X
- The Story of Art, E.H. Gombrich, London : Phaidon Press, Ltd., 1995 ISBN 0-7148-3247-2
- Parmigianino and European Mannerism, Kunsthistorisches Museum Vienna, in English
- A. Bartsch, XVI, Vienna, 1818, pp.6–15, nos.1–15.
- L. Fröhlich-Bum, Parmigianino und der Manierismus, Vienna, 1921, p.69.
- N. Takahatake, The Chiaroscruo Woodcut in Italy, Munich, London and New York, 2019, pp.98–123.
- C. Jenkins, "The States of Francesco Parmigianino’s Etchings: A New Catalogue", Print Quarterly, vol.XLIII, no.2 (June 2026), pp. 115–57.
