= 100 great paintings from Duccio to Picasso =

Book by Dillian Gordon

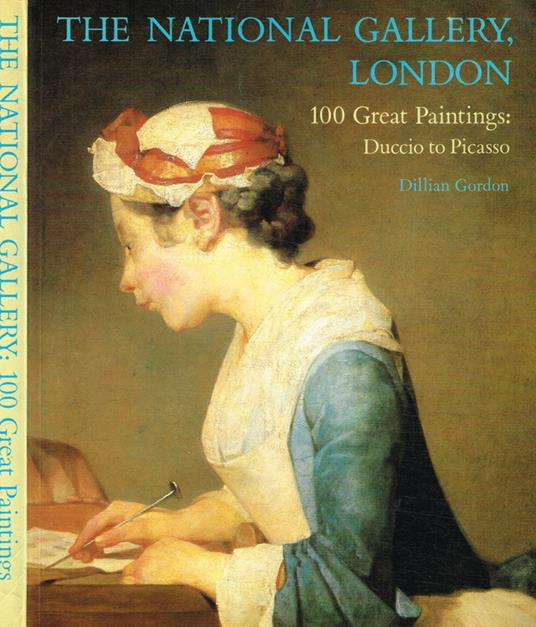
Cover

100 great paintings from Duccio to Picasso is a selection of European paintings in the National Gallery, London, from the 14th to the 20th century. They were selected by curator Dillian Gordon for a National Gallery book in 1981.

== List of illustrations ==
Image	Article	Date	Painter	Catalog code
	The Annunciation	circa 1300	Duccio di Buoninsegna	NG1139
	Wilton Diptych	circa 1397	No/unknown value	NG4451
	Madonna and Child	1426	Masaccio	NG3046
	Saint Francis and the Poor Knight, and Francis's Vision	1437	Stefano di Giovanni	NG4757
	Saint John the Baptist retiring to the Desert	1454	Giovanni di Paolo	NG5454
	The Vision of Saint Eustace	circa 1400	Pisanello	NG1436
	The Baptism of Christ	1448	Piero della Francesca	NG665
	The Nativity	1460	Piero della Francesca	NG908
	Niccolò Mauruzi da Tolentino at the Battle of San Romano	1438	Paolo Uccello	NG583
	Tobias and the Angel	circa 1470	No/unknown value	NG781
	Annunciation	circa 1450	Filippo Lippi	NG666
	Martyrdom of Saint Sebastian	1475	Piero del Pollaiuolo; Antonio del Pollaiuolo	NG292
	Venus and Mars	1485	Sandro Botticelli	NG915
	The Mystical Nativity	1500	Sandro Botticelli	NG1034
	Virgin of the Rocks	circa 1494	Leonardo da Vinci	NG1093
	The Virgin and Child with Saint Anne and Saint John the Baptist	1499	Leonardo da Vinci	NG6337
	Ansidei Madonna	1505	Raphael	NG1171
	Portrait of Pope Julius II	1511	Raphael	NG27
	The Entombment	circa 1500	Michelangelo	NG790
	Portrait of a young Man	1517	Andrea del Sarto	NG690
	Venus, Cupid, Folly and Time	1545	Bronzino	NG651
	Portrait of a Man (Self Portrait?)	1433	Jan van Eyck	NG222
	Arnolfini Portrait	1434	Jan van Eyck	NG186
	The Virgin and Child before a Firescreen	circa 1425	No/unknown value	NG2609
	The Magdalen Reading	1435	Rogier van der Weyden	NG654
	Donne Triptych	1478	Hans Memling	NG6275
	Saint Jerome in His Study	1474	Antonello da Messina	NG1418
	The Agony in the Garden	circa 1450	Andrea Mantegna	NG1417
	The Annunciation, with Saint Emidius	1486	Carlo Crivelli	NG739
	Portrait of Doge Leonardo Loredan	circa 1500	Giovanni Bellini	NG189
	Madonna del Prato	circa 1500	Giovanni Bellini	NG599
	Portrait of Gerolamo (?) Barbarigo	1510	Titian	NG1944
	Bacchus and Ariadne	circa 1520	Titian	NG35
	Portrait of the Vendramin Family	circa 1540	Titian	NG4452
	The Death of Actaeon	1567	Titian	NG6420
	Saint George and the Dragon	1555	Jacopo Tintoretto	NG16
	The Family of Darius before Alexander	1565	Paolo Veronese	NG294
	Madonna of the Basket	1525	Antonio da Correggio	NG23
	Venus with Mercury and Cupid ('The School of Love')	1527	Antonio da Correggio	NG10
	Vision of Saint Jerome	1526	Parmigianino	NG33
	Portrait of a Woman	circa 1530	Lorenzo Lotto	NG4256
	The Tailor	circa 1567	Giovanni Battista Moroni	NG697
	Supper at Emmaus	1601	Caravaggio	NG172
	The Dead Christ mourned by Two Angels	1618	Guercino	NG22
	The Adoration of the Golden Calf	1634	Nicolas Poussin	NG5597
	The Embarkation of the Queen of Sheba	1648	Claude Lorrain	NG14
	Saints Peter and Dorothy	1507	Master of the Saint Bartholomew Altarpiece	NG707
	Cupid Complaining to Venus	circa 1526	Lucas Cranach the Elder	NG6344
	Christ Taking Leave of his Mother	1520	Albrecht Altdorfer	NG6463
	The Ambassadors	1533	Hans Holbein the Younger	NG1314
	The Adoration of the Kings	1564	Pieter Brueghel the Elder	NG3556
	Samson and Delilah	circa 1609	Peter Paul Rubens	NG6461
	The Watering Place	circa 1618	Peter Paul Rubens	NG4815
	Portrait of Susanna Lunden	1622	Peter Paul Rubens	NG852
	Minerva protects Pax from Mars	1629	Peter Paul Rubens	NG46
	Equestrian Portrait of Charles I	circa 1630	Anthony van Dyck	NG1172
	Portrait of an 11-year-old Boy	1650	Jacob van Oost	NG1137
	Philip IV in Brown and Silver	1635	Diego Velázquez	NG1129
	Rokeby Venus	1644	Diego Velázquez	NG2057
	The Heavenly and Earthly Trinities	1680	Bartolomé Esteban Murillo	NG13
	Saint Margaret of Antioch	1631	Francisco de Zurbarán	NG1930
	Portrait of Doña Isabel de Porcel	circa 1800	Francisco Goya	NG1473
	A Winter Scene with Skaters near a Castle	1608	Hendrick Avercamp	NG1346
	The Interior of the St. Bavo Church in Haarlem	circa 1636	Pieter Jansz. Saenredam	NG2531
	Still life with Drinking-Horn	1653	Willem Kalf	NG6444
	Peasants with Cattle by a Ruined Aqueduct	circa 1658	Nicolaes Pieterszoon Berchem	NG820
	Skittle Players outside an Inn	1663	Jan Steen	NG2560
	The Huis ten Bosch at The Hague	circa 1670	Jan van der Heyden	NG1914
	Self-Portrait at the Age of 34	1640	Rembrandt	NG672
	A Woman bathing in a Stream (Hendrickje Stoffels?)	1654	Rembrandt	NG54
	Portrait of Margaretha de Geer	1661	Rembrandt	NG1675
	A Landscape with a Ruined Castle and a Church	1665	Jacob van Ruisdael	NG990
	Woman and Maid in a Courtyard	1660	Pieter de Hooch	NG794
	A Young Woman standing at a Virginal	circa 1670	Johannes Vermeer	NG1383
	The Avenue at Middelharnis	1689	Meindert Hobbema	NG830
	Marriage A-la-Mode: 1. The Marriage Settlement	1743	William Hogarth	NG113
	Captain Robert Orme	1756	Joshua Reynolds	NG681
	Mr and Mrs William Hallett ('The Morning Walk')	1785	Thomas Gainsborough	NG6209
	The Milbanke and Melbourne Families	1769	George Stubbs	NG6429
	Queen Charlotte	1789	Thomas Lawrence	NG4257
	The Hay Wain	1821	John Constable	NG1207
	The Fighting Temeraire tugged to her last Berth to be broken up	1834	J. M. W. Turner	NG524
	The Stonemason's Yard	1725	Canaletto	NG127
	An Allegory with Venus and Time	circa 1754	Giovanni Battista Tiepolo	NG6387
	The Young Schoolmistress	circa 1735	Jean-Baptiste-Siméon Chardin	NG4077
	A Lady in a Garden taking Coffee with some Children	1742	Nicolas Lancret	NG6422
	Madame de Pompadour at her Tambour Frame	circa 1763	François-Hubert Drouais	NG6440
	Madame Moitessier	1856	Jean Auguste Dominique Ingres	NG4821
	Music in the Tuileries	1862	Édouard Manet	NG3260
	Bathers at La Grenouillère	1869	Claude Monet	NG6456
	Miss La La at the Cirque Fernando	1879	Edgar Degas	NG4121
	Hélène Rouart in her Father's Study	1886	Edgar Degas	NG6469
	The Umbrellas	1881	Pierre-Auguste Renoir	NG3268
	Bathers at Asnières	1884	Georges Seurat	NG3908
	Sunflowers	1888	Vincent van Gogh	NG3863
	Tiger in a Tropical Storm	1891	Henri Rousseau	NG6421
	The Mantelpiece	1905	Édouard Vuillard	NG3271
	Ophelia among the Flowers	circa 1905	Odilon Redon	NG6438
	Bathers (Les Grandes Baigneuses)	1894	Paul Cézanne	NG6359
	Fruit Dish, Bottle and Violin	1914	Pablo Picasso	NG6449

== See also ==
- Catalogue of paintings in the National Gallery, London
