= Madonna of the Basket =

Madonna of the Basket may refer to:

- Madonna of the Basket (Correggio), 1525
- Madonna of the Basket (Rubens), 1615
