= Martin Davies (museum director) =

British museum director and civil servant

Sir Martin Davies, CBE FBA FSA (22 March 1908 – 7 March 1975) was a British museum director and civil servant. He worked at the National Gallery in London from 1930 to 1973, and was Director from 1968.

Davies attended Rugby School, and thereafter read mathematics and modern languages at King's College, Cambridge. He first joined the staff of the National Gallery, the institution to which he was to devote his career, as an attaché in 1930. After being made Assistant Keeper in 1932 he called for improved research on the paintings in the collection, which would eventually come to fruition in the series of catalogues inaugurated by Davies and still being produced by the Gallery today. These set new standards for the catalogues of large collections, and have been widely imitated.

His scholarly work was interrupted from 1938 to 1941 by the need to find a safe home for the National Gallery's paintings at the onset of the Second World War, away from the aerial bombardment of London. After the artworks were safely transferred to Manod Quarry near Ffestiniog, North Wales, Davies was able to make his research in total seclusion. The catalogues for the Netherlandish, French, and British schools of painting were published from 1945 to 1946. The much larger Catalogue of the Earlier Italian Schools was published in 1961. Many of these paintings are now covered by published volumes of the new series of catalogues, but for example, only the 17th century French paintings are covered under the new series, whereas Davies covered all French periods.

Davies rose steadily in the ranks at the National Gallery until in 1968 he was appointed Director. The public campaign in 1971 to buy Titian's late masterpiece The Death of Actaeon was one of the great successes of his directorship. Davies's stated aim as director was to make the National Gallery the main public purchaser of artistic masterpieces, in which he succeeded, acquiring notable works by Caravaggio (Salome with the Head of Saint John the Baptist), Tiepolo (An Allegory with Venus and Time ) and Henri Rousseau (Tiger in a Tropical Storm).

Davies was knighted in 1972, the year before his retirement, and died in 1975.

== Bibliography ==
- The Early Netherlandish School (National Gallery Catalogues), The National Gallery, 1945; 2nd ed. 1955, 3rd ed. 1968.
- The British School (National Gallery Catalogues), The National Gallery, 1946; 2nd ed. 1954, 3rd ed. 1959(?)
- French School (National Gallery Catalogues), The National Gallery, 1946; 2nd ed. 1957.
- A Few Saints From Pictures in the National Gallery, The National Gallery, 1946.
- Leonardo da Vinci: The Virgin of the Rocks in the National Gallery, The National Gallery, 1947.
- Carlo Crivelli: The Annunciation, The National Gallery, 1947.
- The Earlier Italian Schools (National Gallery Catalogues), The National Gallery, 1951; 2nd ed. 1961, 3rd ed. 1963, later ed. 1986 ISBN 0-901791-29-6
  - This includes all "pictures up to the end of the Early Renaissance" – taken roughly as 1500, but including for example Perugino. A truncated revision by Dillian Gordon was published in 1988 as "The Italian Schools before 1400" in the new series of catalogues. A completely new Volume 1 of The Fifteenth Century Italian Paintings, also by Gordon, roughly up to 1450, has been published, but for 1450–1500 Davies's work remains the most recent full catalogue.
- Carlo Crivelli: Themes and Painters in the National Gallery (Number 4), The National Gallery, 1972.
- Rogier van der Weyden; An Essay and Critical Catalogue of Painting Assigned to Him and Robert Campin, Phaidon, 1972.
- Rembrandt, The National Gallery, 1976 (2nd edition).
