= Dillian Gordon =

English art historian

Dillian Rosalind Gordon OBE is a British art historian who worked as a curator at the National Gallery, London from 1978 to 2010, latterly as Curator of Italian Paintings before 1460. She lives in Oxford. She was appointed OBE in 2011 for services to Early Italian Painting. She has authored and co-authored many books, including several National Gallery catalogues.

== Education ==
Dillian Gordon studied Modern and Medieval Languages at Girton College, Cambridge. She then attended the Courtauld Institute of Art, University of London, where she completed her MA in 1972, with a dissertation on 'The gilded glass Madonna in the Fitzwilliam, Cambridge', followed by a PhD in 1979, 'Art in Umbria c.1250-c.1350', also at the Courtauld. Photographs taken by Gordon while a student are held in the Conway Library at the Courtauld, and are currently (2020) being digitised.

== Professional work ==
Gordon worked at the National Gallery, London, as a curator of early Italian paintings from 1978 until 2010, latterly as Curator of Italian Paintings before 1460. Nicholas Penny, Director, states that Gordon was the first woman to work as a curator at the National Gallery. He mentions some important acquisitions that she was able to arrange, as well as her valued work on exhibitions, and praises her for her meticulous cataloguing of the collection's Early Italian art. She retired from the National Gallery in 2010, but continues to research and write about 13th and 14th century Italian painting.

A highlight of Gordon's curatorial career came in 2000, when she was asked by Sotheby's to assess a painting of a Madonna and Child Enthroned with Two Angels, discovered at Benacre Hall, Suffolk. This prompted a special visit to the Frick Collection in New York, where Gordon and others were able to compare the painting with a similar one acquired by them in 1950, the Flagellation, and the Madonna and Child was identified as coming from the same six-panel diptych, part of an altarpiece, by the 13th century Florentine artist, Cimabue. The panel, dated circa 1280, was subsequently acquired by the National Gallery. Dr Gordon returned to the Frick in 2006 to give a lecture on the subject, when the Madonna and Child was shown alongside the Flagellation in a special exhibition, Cimabue and Early Italian Devotional Painting. Prior to this, in 2003, a further Cimabue panel had been discovered in France, entitled The Mocking of Christ, and Dr Gordon was again asked for her opinion: the panel was dated circa 1280 and considered to be from the same altarpiece as the Madonna and Child and the Flagellation. This panel was recently acquired by the Louvre Museum.

In 2006 her opinion was sought on a different artist, when two small paintings were discovered hanging in a modest terraced house in Oxford. They were identified as being by the 15th century Florentine artist Fra Angelico, and thought to be from a panel of eight saints, originally part of an altarpiece from the monastery of San Marco in Florence, dated circa 1440, commissioned by Cosimo de' Medici the Elder. The two paintings sold at auction for £1.7m in April 2007.

== Publications ==
=== Books and catalogues ===
- 100 Great paintings, Duccio to Picasso: European paintings from the 14th to the 20th Century, London: National Gallery, 1981.
- Second sight. Rubens: 'The Watering Place', Gainsborough: 'The Watering Place', National Gallery exhibition catalogue, 18 February-20 April 1981, 1981.
- The National Gallery lends paintings of the warm south by foreign painters in Italy in 17th century: an exhibition organised in conjunction with the Arts Council of Great Britain, London: National Gallery, 1982.
- Early Italian paintings and works of art, 1300-1480: in aid of the Friends of the Fitzwilliam Museum in association with Stair Sainty Matthiesen, London : Matthiesen Fine Art, 1983.
- Edgar Degas: Hélène Rouart in her father's study, London: National Gallery (exhibition booklet), 1984.
- British paintings, London: National Gallery, 1986.
- The Wilton Diptych, London: National Gallery, 2001. This book was published to accompany an exhibition at the National Gallery, London, taking place from 15 September to 12 December 1993.
- The Italian Paintings, 1400-1460, London: National Gallery, 2001.
- The fifteenth century Italian paintings. Vol. 1, London: National Gallery, 2003.
- The Italian Paintings Before 1400, London: National Gallery, 2011.

=== Co-authored works ===
- Dillian Gordon and Anthony Reeve, 'Three Newly-Acquired Panels from the Altarpiece for Santa Croce by Ugolino di Nerio', Technical Bulletin 8, London: National Gallery, 1984.
- Dillian Gordon, David Bomford, Joyce Plesters and Ashok Roy, 'Nardo di Cione's Altarpiece: Three Saints', Technical Bulletin 9, London: National Gallery, 1985.
- Martin Davies and Dillian Gordon, The Early Italian schools: before 1400, London: National Gallery, 1988.
- Anthea Callen, Dillian Gordon and Richard Kendall, Degas, images of women, London: Tate Gallery, 1989.
- David Bomford, Jill Dunkerton, Dillian Gordon, Ashok Roy and Jo Kirby, Italian painting before 1400, London: National Gallery, 1989.
- Jill Dunkerton, Susan Foster, Dillian Gordon and Nicholas Penny, Giotto to Dürer: Early Renaissance Painting in the National Gallery, New Haven: Yale University Press, London: National Gallery, 1991.
- Dillian Gordon, Lisa Monnas and Caroline Elam, The regal image of Richard II and the Wilton Diptych, London: Harvey Miller, 1997.
- Paul Ackroyd, Larry Keith and Dillian Gordon, 'The Restoration of Lorenzo Monaco's Coronation of the Virgin: Retouching and Display', Technical Bulletin 21, London: National Gallery, 2000.
- Luke Syson and Dillian Gordon, Pisanello: Painter to the Renaissance Court, London: National Gallery, 2001.
- Ashok Roy and Dillian Gordon, 'Uccello's Battle of San Romano, Technical Bulletin 22, London: National Gallery, 2001.
- Dillian Gordon and Martin Davies, The Italian schools before 1400, London: National Gallery, 2001.
- Dillian Gordon, Martin Wyld and Ashok Roy, 'Fra Angelico's Predella for the High Altarpiece of San Domenico, Fiesole', Technical Bulletin 23, London: National Gallery, 2002.
- Rachel Billinge and Dillian Gordon, 'The Use of Gilded Tin in Giotto's Pentecost', Technical Bulletin 29, London: National Gallery, 2008.
- Britta New, Helen Howard, Rachel Billinge, Hayley Tomlinson, David Peggie and Dillian Gordon, 'Niccolò di Pietro Gerini's Baptism Altarpiece: Technique, Conservation and Original Design', Technical Bulletin 33, London: National Gallery, 2012.
- Dillian Gordon, Caroline M Barron, Ashok Roy, Rachel Billinge and Martin Wyld, The Wilton Diptych, London: National Gallery, New Haven: Yale University Press, 2015.

=== Articles ===
- 'A Sienese verre eglomisé and its setting', Burlington Magazine, ed. Benedict Nicolson, Vol. 123, pp. 148–153, 1981.
- 'A Perugian provenance for the Franciscan double-sided altar-piece by the Maestro di S. Francesco', Burlington Magazine, ed. Benedict Nicolson, Vol. 124, pp. 70–77, 1982.
- 'The vision of the blessed Clare of Rimini', Apollo, Vol. 124, pp. 150–153, 1986.
- 'A dossal by Giotto and his workshop: some problems of attribution, provenance and patronage', Burlington Magazine, Vol. 131, 1989.
- 'Simone Martini's altar-piece for S. Agostino, San Gimignano', Burlington Magazine, ed. Benedict Nicolson, Vol. 133, p. 771, 1991.
- 'Perugian fourteenth-century manuscript illumination: Vannes di Baldolo and his associates', Apollo, Vol. 134, pp. 327–332, 1991.
- 'A New Discovery in the Wilton Diptych', Burlington Magazine, Vol. 134, pp. 662–667, 1992.
- 'The reconstruction of Sassetta's altar-piece for S. Francesco, Borgo San Sepolcro: a postscript', Burlington Magazine, ed. Benedict Nicolson, Vol. 135, pp. 620–623, 1993.
- 'The mass production of Franciscan piety: another look at some Umbrian "verres eglomisés", Apollo, Vol. 140, pp. 33–42, 1994.
- 'A new document for the high altarpiece for S. Benedetto fuori della Porta Pinti, Florence' (with Anabel Thomas), Burlington Magazine, ed. Benedict Nicolson, Vol. 137, pp. 720–722, 1995.
- 'The altar-piece by Lorenzo Monaco in the National Gallery, London', Burlington Magazine, ed. Benedict Nicolson, Vol. 137, pp. 723–727, 1995.
- 'The art of devotion', Apollo, Vol. 141, pp. 59–60, 1995.
- 'Renaissance painting and illumination at the Metropolitan', Apollo, Vol. 140, pp. 50–51, 1995.
- 'The "missing" predella panel from Pesellino's trinity altar-piece', Burlington Magazine, Vol. 138, pp. 87–88, 1996.
- 'The so-called Paciano Master and the Franciscans in Perugia', Apollo, Vol. 143, pp. 33–39, 1996.
- 'Zanobi Strozzi's Annunciation in the National Gallery', Burlington Magazine, ed. Benedict Nicolson, Vol. 140, pp. 517–524, 1998.
- 'The Virgin and Child by Cimabue at the National Gallery', Apollo, Vol. 157, pp. 32–36, 2003.
- 'Duccio's adjustment to The Temptation of Christ on the mountain from his Maestà', Burlington Magazine, Vol. 151, pp. 19–21, 2009.
- 'Andrea di Bonaiuto's painting in the National Gallery and S. Maria Novella: the memory of a church', Burlington Magazine, Vol. 151, pp. 512–518, 2009.
- 'Two newly identified panels from Mariotto di Nardo's altarpiece for the Da Filicaia chapel in S. Maria degli Angeli, Florence', Burlington Magazine, ed. Benedict Nicolson, Vol. 155, pp. 25–28, 2013.
- 'A possible French source for the left wing of the Wilton diptych', Burlington Magazine, Vol. 157, pp. 821–826, 2015.
- 'Bicci di Lorenzo's altarpiece for the Compagni family chapel in S. Trinita, Florence', Burlington Magazine, ed. Benedict Nicolson, Vol. 161, pp. 36–43, 2019.
- 'The Nobili altarpiece from S. Maria degli Angeli, Florence', Burlington Magazine, ed. Benedict Nicolson, Vol. 162, pp. 14–25, 2020.
