= Ludovico Ariosto =

Italian poet (1474–1533)

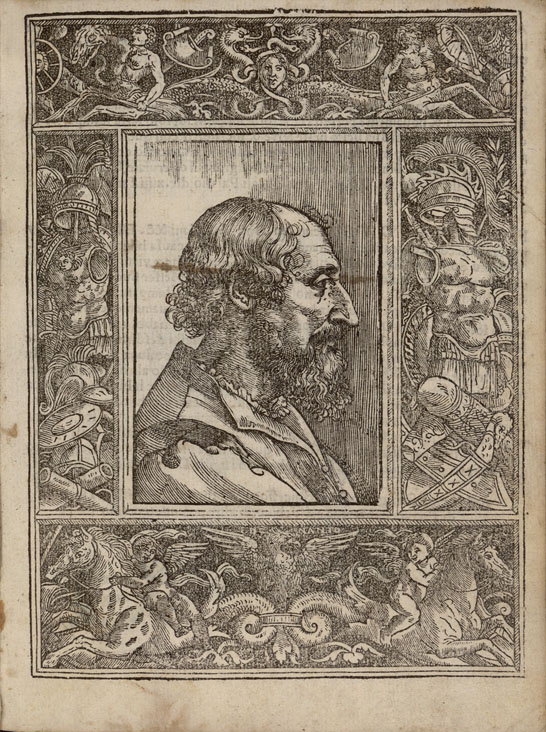
- Engraving taken from a drawing by Titian depicting Ludovico Ariosto, published in the 1532 edition of Orlando Furioso
- Born: 8 September 1474; Reggio Emilia, Duchy of Modena and Reggio
- Died: 6 July 1533 (aged 58); Ferrara, Duchy of Ferrara
- Occupation: Poet
- Parent(s): Niccolò Ariosto and Daria Ariosto (née Malaguzzi Valeri)
- Writing career
- Language: Italian
- Period: Renaissance
- Genre: Epic poetry
- Subject: Chivalry
- Notable works: Satire, Commedie; Orlando Furioso
- Movement: Renaissance literature

Ludovico Ariosto (UK: /æriˈɒstoʊ/, US: /ɑːriˈ-/; Italian: [ludoˈviːko aˈrjɔsto, - ariˈɔsto]; 8 September 1474 – 6 July 1533) was an Italian poet. He is best known as the author of the romance epic Orlando Furioso (1516-1532). The poem, a continuation of Matteo Maria Boiardo's Orlando Innamorato, describes the adventures of Charlemagne, Orlando, and the Franks as they battle against the Saracens with diversions into many sideplots. The poem is transformed into a satire of the chivalric tradition. Ariosto composed the poem in the ottava rima rhyme scheme and introduced narrative commentary throughout the work.

Ariosto also coined the term "humanism" (in Italian, umanesimo) for choosing to focus upon the strengths and potential of humanity, rather than only upon its role as subordinate to God. This led to Renaissance humanism.

== Birth and early life ==
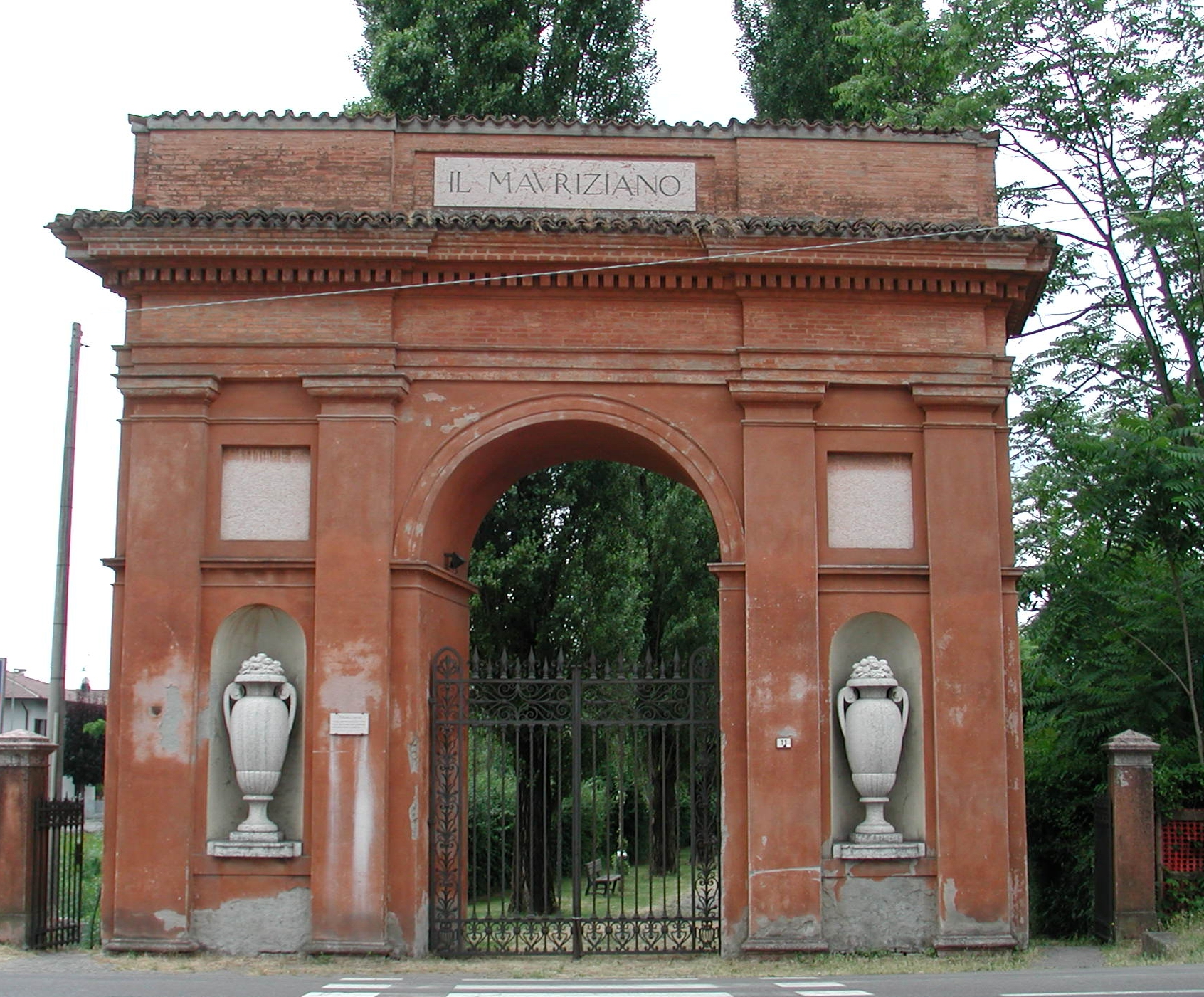
Entrance to the villa where Ariosto was born

Ariosto was born in Reggio nell'Emilia, where his father Niccolò Ariosto was commander of the citadel. He was the oldest of 10 children and was seen as the successor to the patriarchal position of his family. From his earliest years, Ludovico was very interested in poetry, but he was obliged by his father to study law.

After five years of law, Ariosto was allowed to read classics under Gregorio da Spoleto. Ariosto's studies of Greek and Latin literature were cut short by Spoleto's move to France to tutor Francesco Sforza. Shortly after this, Ariosto's father died.

== Education and patronage ==
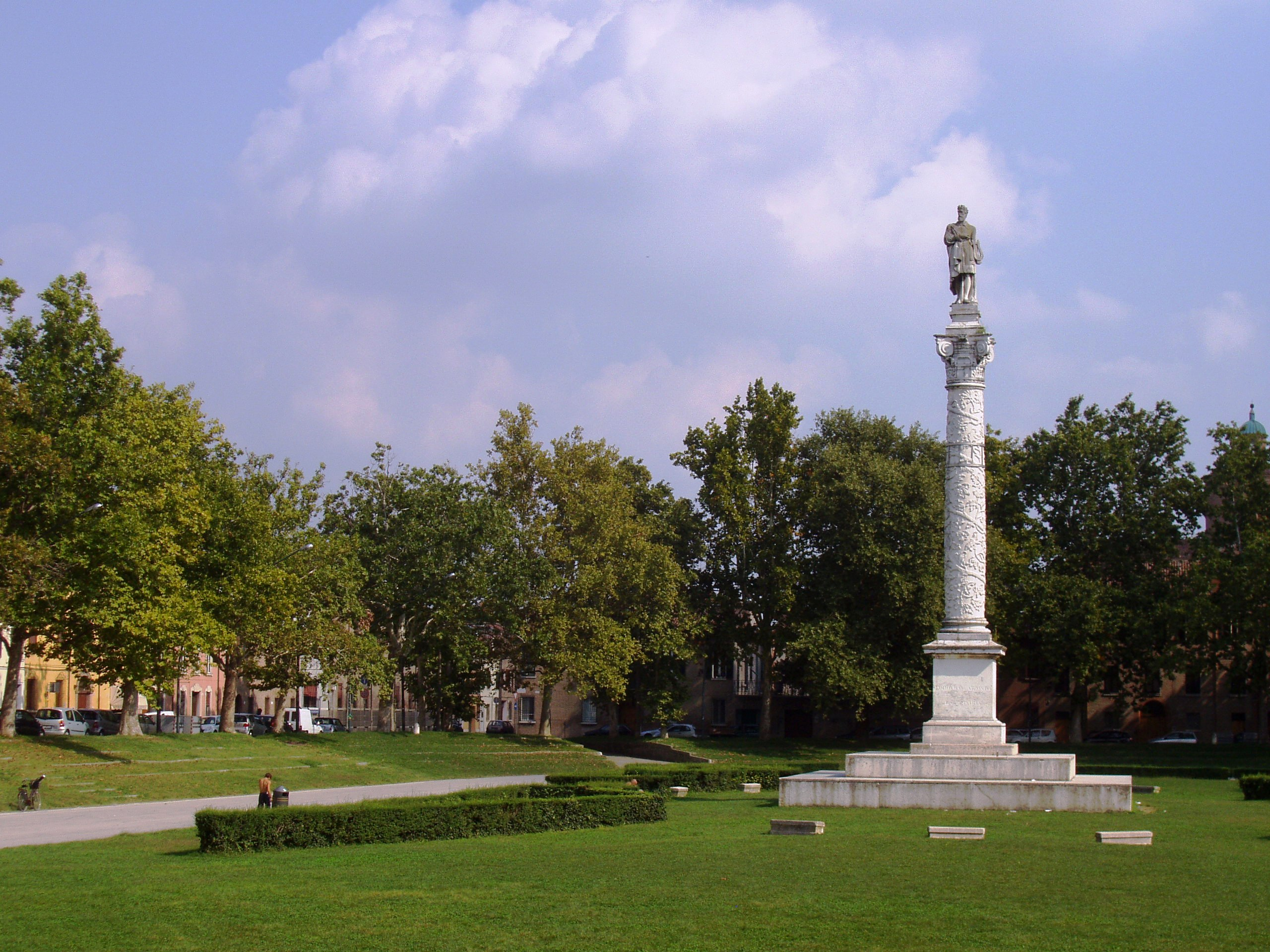
Memorial statue and park, Ferrara

After the death of his father, Ludovico Ariosto was compelled to forgo his literary occupations and take care of his family, whose affairs were in disarray. Despite his family obligations, Ariosto managed to write some comedies in prose as well as lyrical pieces. Some of these attracted the notice of Cardinal Ippolito d'Este, who took the young poet under his patronage and appointed him one of the gentlemen of his household. Este compensated Ariosto poorly for his efforts; the only reward he gave the poet for Orlando Furioso, dedicated to him, was the question, "Where did you find so many stories, Master Ludovico?" Ariosto later said that the cardinal was ungrateful, that he deplored the time which he spent under his yoke, and that if he received some small pension, it was not to reward him for his poetry – which the prelate despised – but for acting as a messenger.

Ludovico Ariosto and Leonardo da Vinci shared a patron in Cardinal Ippolito d'Este's older sister the Marchioness Isabella d'Este, the "First Lady of the Renaissance." Isabella d'Este appears in Ludovico's masterpiece, Orlando Furioso. She also appears in Leonardo's Sketch for a Portrait of Isabella d'Este at the Louvre.

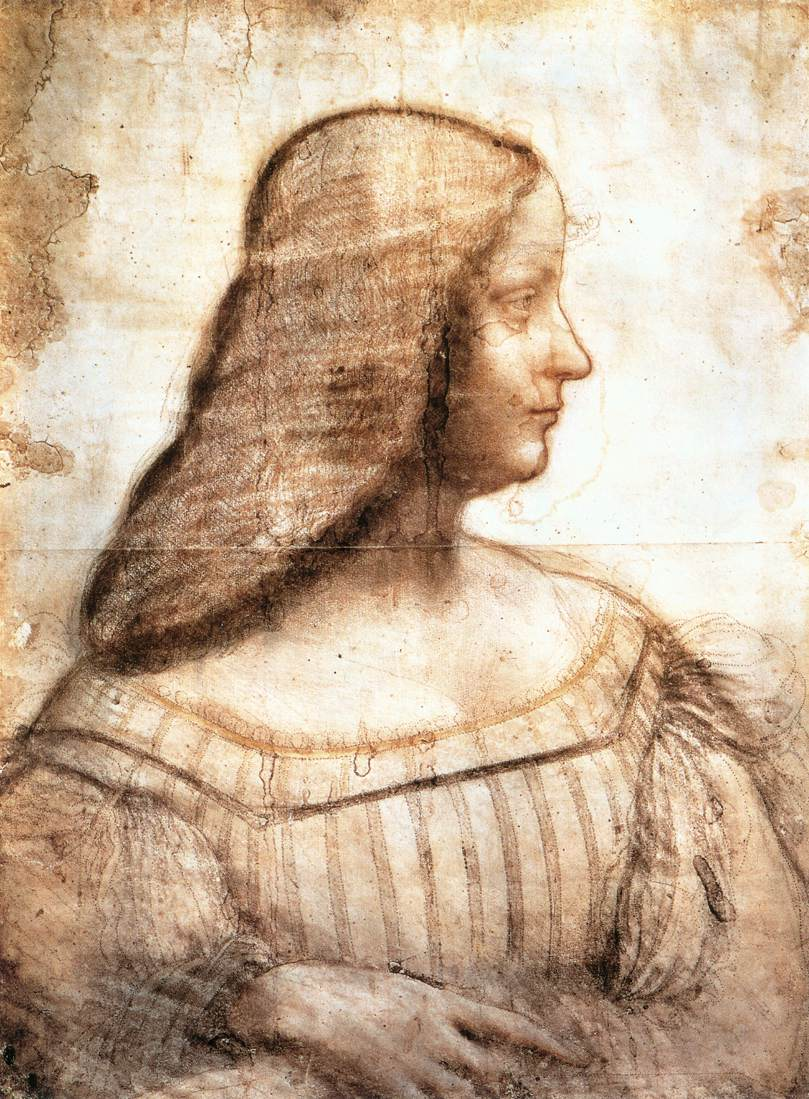
Portrait of Isabella d'Este, Leonardo da Vinci, 1499–1500

A statue no less jocund, no less bright,
Succeeds, and on the writing is impressed;
Lo! Hercules' daughter, Isabella hight,
In whom Ferrara deems city blest,
Much more because she first shall see the light
Within its circuit, than for all the rest
Which kind and favouring Fortune in the flow
Of rolling years, shall on that town bestow.

— Orlando Furioso, Canto XLII.

The cardinal went to Hungary in 1518, and wished Ariosto to accompany him. The poet excused himself, pleading ill health, his love of study, and the need to care for his elderly mother. His excuses were not well-received, and he was denied even an interview. Ariosto and d'Este got into a heated argument, and Ariosto was promptly dismissed from service.

== New patronage and diplomatic career ==
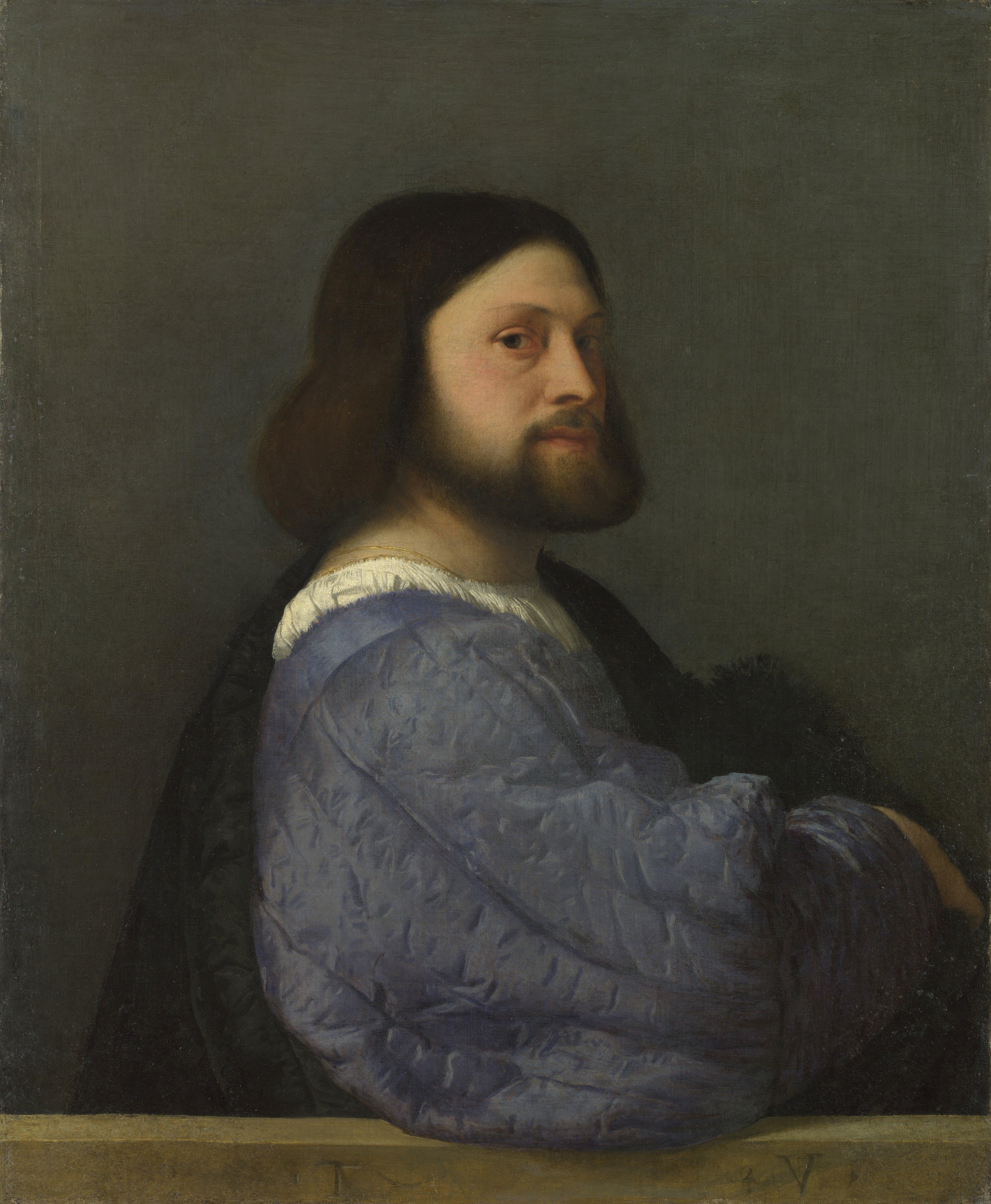
Titian, A Man with a Quilted Sleeve, long believed to be Ludovico Ariosto

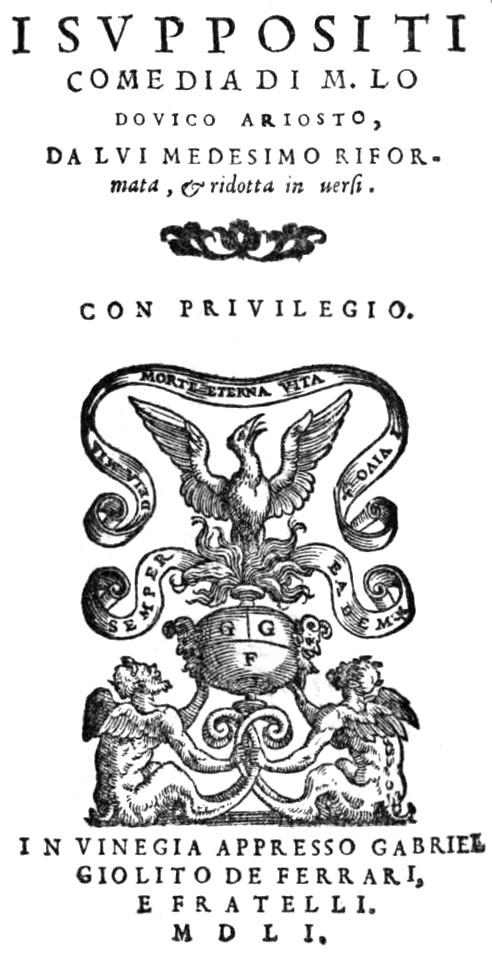
Ariosto's play I suppositi, first published in verse form in 1551

The cardinal's brother, Alfonso, duke of Ferrara, now took Ariosto under his patronage. By then, Ariosto had already distinguished himself as a diplomat, chiefly on the occasion of two visits to Rome as ambassador to Pope Julius II. The fatigue of one of these journeys brought on an illness from which he never recovered, and on his second mission he was nearly killed by order of the Pope, who happened at the time to be in conflict with Alfonso.

On account of the war, his salary of 84 crowns a year was suspended, and it was withdrawn altogether after the peace. Because of this, Ariosto asked the duke either to provide for him, or to allow him to seek employment elsewhere. He was appointed to the province of Garfagnana, then without a governor, situated on the Apennines, an appointment he held for three years. The province was distracted by factions and bandits, the governor lacked the requisite means to enforce his authority and the duke did little to support his minister. Ariosto's government satisfied both the sovereign and the people given over to his care, however; indeed, there is a story about a time when he was walking alone and fell into the company of a group of bandits, the chief of which, on discovering that his captive was the author of Orlando Furioso, apologized for not having immediately shown him the respect due his rank.

In 1508 Ariosto's play Cassaria appeared, and the next year I suppositi was first acted in Ferrara and ten years later in the Vatican. A prose edition was published in Rome in 1524, and the first verse edition was published at Venice in 1551. The play, which was translated by George Gascoigne and acted at Gray's Inn in London in 1566 and published in 1573, was later used by Shakespeare as a source for The Taming of the Shrew.

In 1516 the first version of the Orlando Furioso in 40 cantos, was published at Ferrara. The third and final version of the Orlando Furioso, in 46 cantos, appeared on 8 September 1532. The work is according to Goethe "a graceful smiling fantastic creation". The third edition of the book is quite distinct in terms of diction and structure. However, it seems that today, the reader tends to consider this version as the primary text. Therefore, it might be beneficial to read the three texts in comparison to gain a more comprehensive understanding. Additionally, imitation was a matter of grace at that time, which is why Ariosto took on the task of completing Boiardo's unfinished Orlando Innamorato.

== Poetic style ==
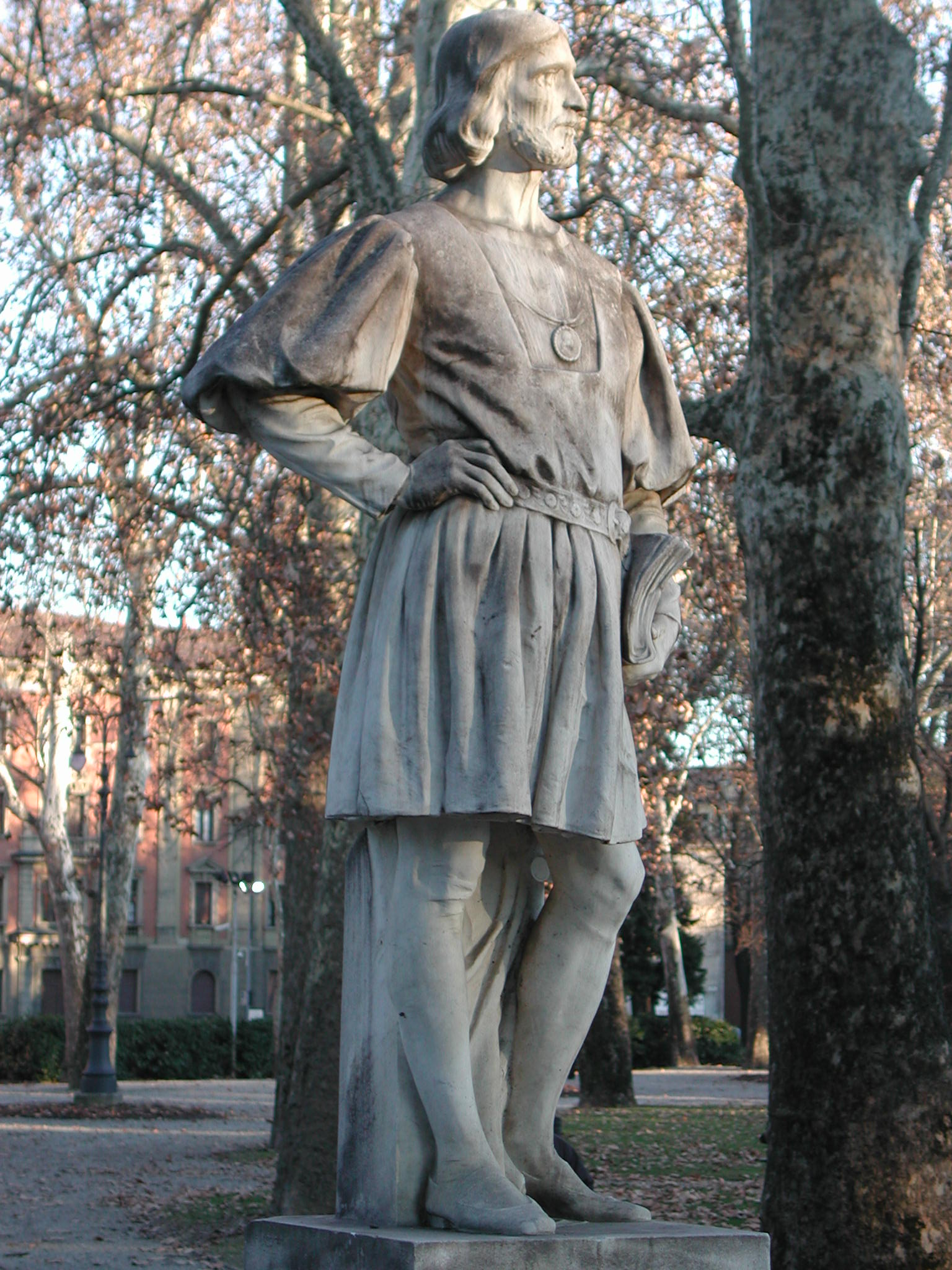
Statue of the poet in Reggio Emilia

Throughout Ariosto's writing are narratorial comments dubbed by Daniel Javitch as "Cantus Interruptus". Javitch's term refers to Ariosto's narrative technique to break off one plot line in the middle of a canto, only to pick it up again in another, often much later, canto. Javitch argues that while many critics have assumed Ariosto does this so as to build narrative tension and keep the reader turning pages, the poet in reality defuses narrative tension because so much time separates the interruption and the resumption. By the time the reader gets to the continuation of the story, he or she has often forgotten or ceased to care about the plot and is usually wrapped up in another plot. Ariosto does this, Javitch argues, to undermine "man's foolish but persistent desire for continuity and completion". Ariosto uses it throughout his works.

For example, in Canto II, stanza 30, of Orlando Furioso, the narrator says:

But I, who still pursue a varying tale,
Must leave awhile the Paladin, who wages
A weary warfare with the wind and flood;
To follow a fair virgin of his blood.

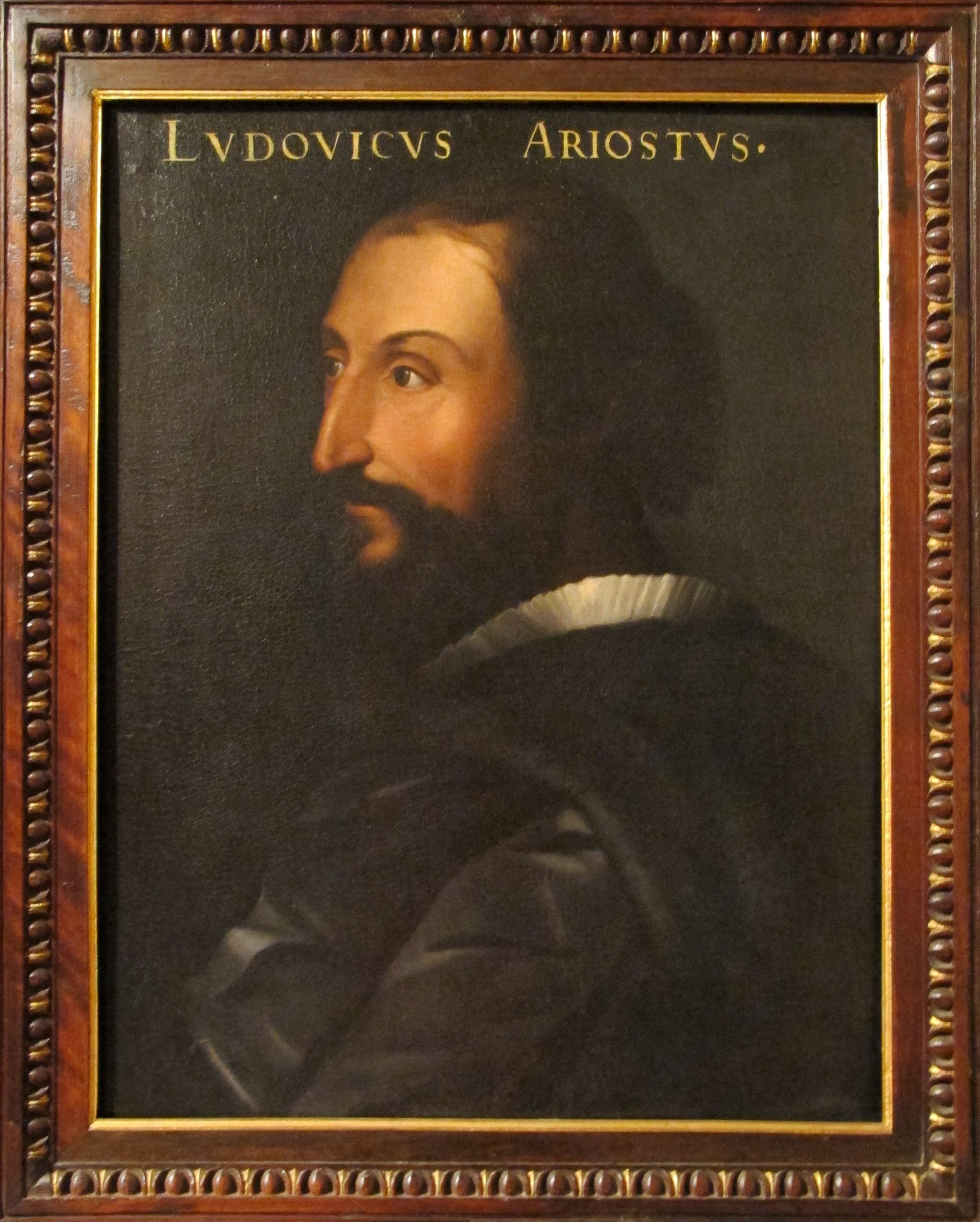
Portrait of Ludovico Ariosto by Cristofano dell'Altissimo

Some have attributed this piece of metafiction as one component of the "Sorriso ariostesco" or Ariosto's smile, the wry sense of humor that Ariosto adds to the text.

In explaining this humor, Thomas Greene, in Descent from Heaven, says:

The two persistent qualities of Ariosto's language are first, serenity – the evenness and self-contented assurance with which it urbanely flows, and second, brilliance – the Mediterranean glitter and sheen which neither dazzle nor obscure but confer on every object its precise outline and glinting surface. Only occasionally can Ariosto's language truly be said to be witty, but its lightness and agility create a surface which conveys a witty effect. Too much wit could destroy even the finest poem, but Ariosto's graceful brio is at least as difficult and for narrative purposes more satisfying.

— Thomas Greene, The Descent from Heaven, a Study in Epic Continuity

== In literature and popular culture ==
Letitia Elizabeth Landon's poem Ariosto to his Mistress. (1836) is supposed to be his address to some unknown beauty on presenting her with his completed Orlando Furioso.

In his poem Childe Harold's Pilgrimage, Canto the Fourth (1818), Lord Byron described poet and novelist Walter Scott as "The Ariosto of the North", and Ariosto as "The southern Scott". In doing so, Byron connected Ariosto and the Italian Renaissance with early-nineteenth century Scottish and British Romantic writing, emphasising an enduring European literary tradition. Scott, in turn, was influenced by Ariosto and expressed his admiration for the Orlando Furioso.

The paperback edition of Orlando Furioso can be briefly glimpsed on table in the dinner scene of the episode "A Ghost" in Jim Jarmusch's film Mystery Train (1989).

Lodovico Ariosto is mentioned in the novelization of the video game Assassin's Creed: Revelations (2011) as a member of the fictional Italian Brotherhood of Assassins. When the protagonist Ezio Auditore retires from the Brotherhood following the events of the game in 1512, he appoints Lodovico to succeed him as Mentor.
