= Saint Margaret of Antioch (Zurbarán) =

Painting by Francisco de Zurbarán

- Saint Margaret of Antioch
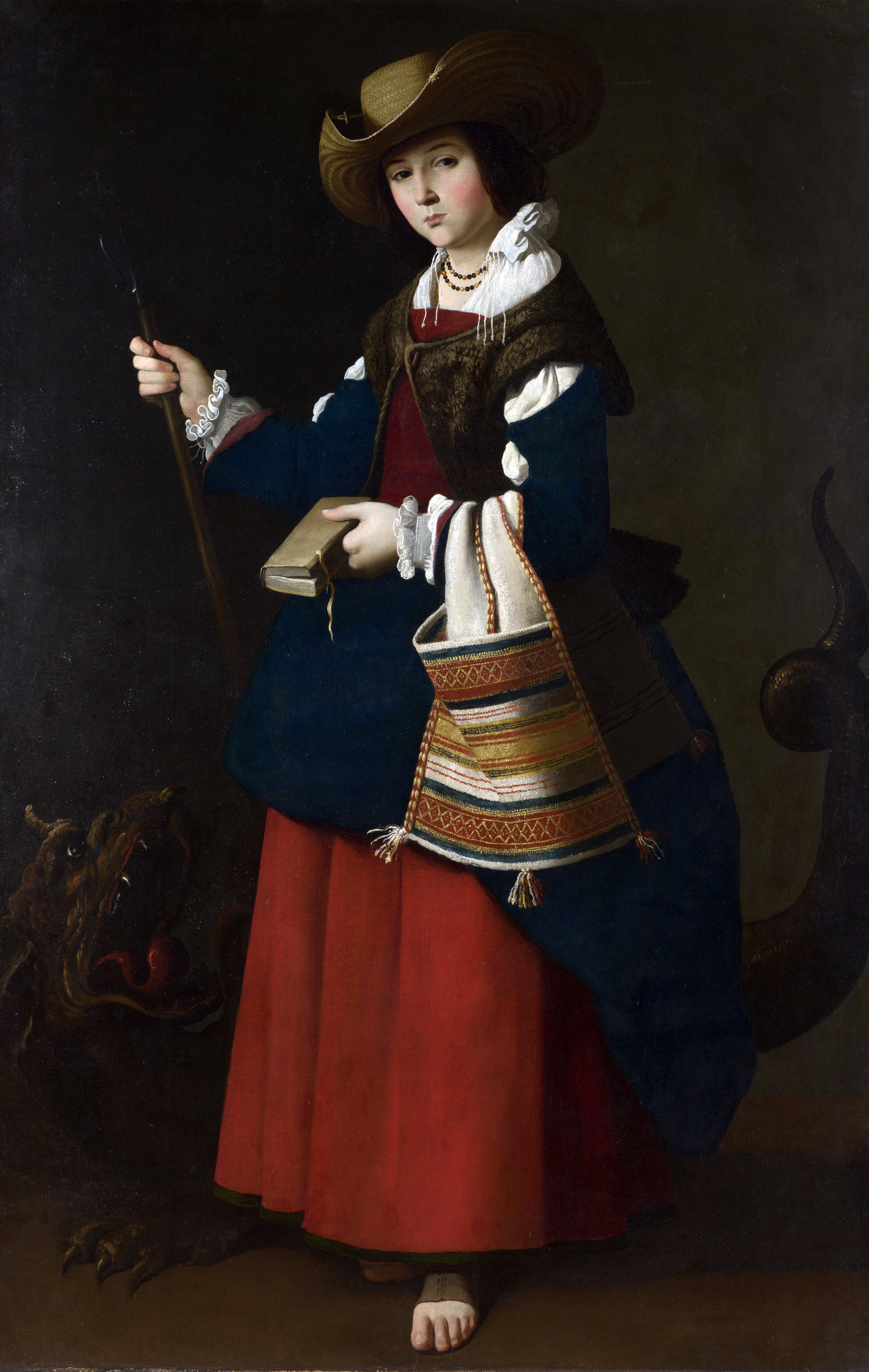
- Artist: Francisco de Zurbarán
- Year: 1631
- Medium: Oil on canvas
- Dimensions: 194 cm (76 in) × 112 cm (44 in)
- Location: National Gallery
- Accession no.: NG1930
- Identifiers: Art UK artwork ID: saint-margaret-of-antioch-115203 Bildindex der Kunst und Architektur ID: 08019545

Saint Margaret of Antioch is a painting of 1631 by the Spanish painter Francisco de Zurbarán now in the National Gallery, London, which bought it in 1903.

The artist shows the saint Margaret of Antioch as a shepherdess, holding a crook (referring to the legend that she grazed her nurse's sheep). Behind her is the dragon from whose stomach she burst. The eyes and facial features of the model are identified by some art historians with the model for the same artist's Saint Agatha.
