= Still Life with Lobster, Drinking Horn and Glasses =

1650s painting by Willem Kalf

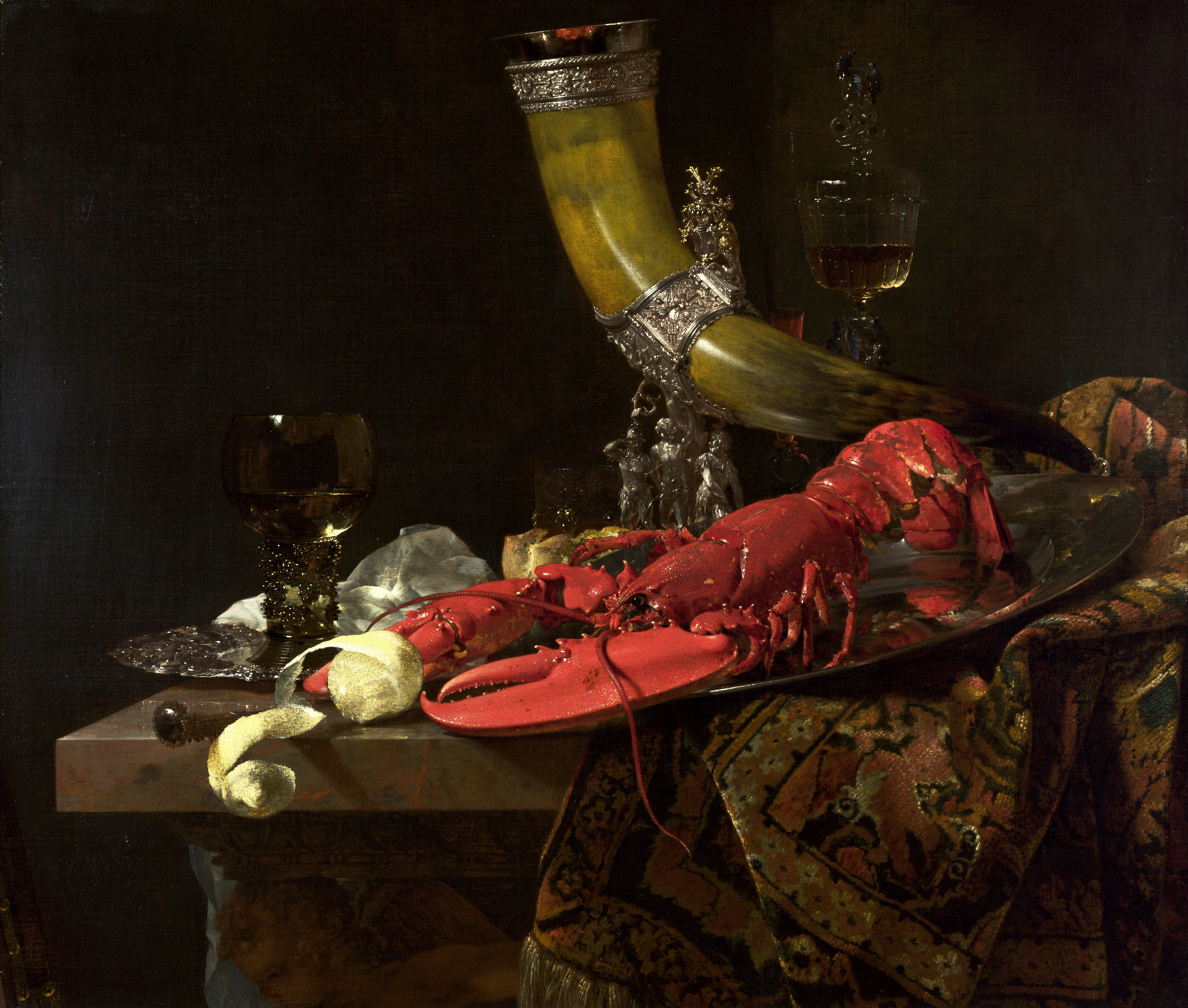
- Artist: Willem Kalf
- Year: Approx. 1653
- Medium: Oil on canvas
- Dimensions: 86.4 cm × 102.2 cm (34.0 in × 40.2 in)
- Location: National Gallery; London

Still Life with Lobster, Drinking Horn and Glasses is a 1653 painting by Dutch artist Willem Kalf. The painting is a still life, and has been referred to as "...a monument to luxury". The horn in the painting dates to 1565, and is held in the Amsterdam Museum.
