= A Woman Bathing in a Stream =

Oil painting by Rembrandt

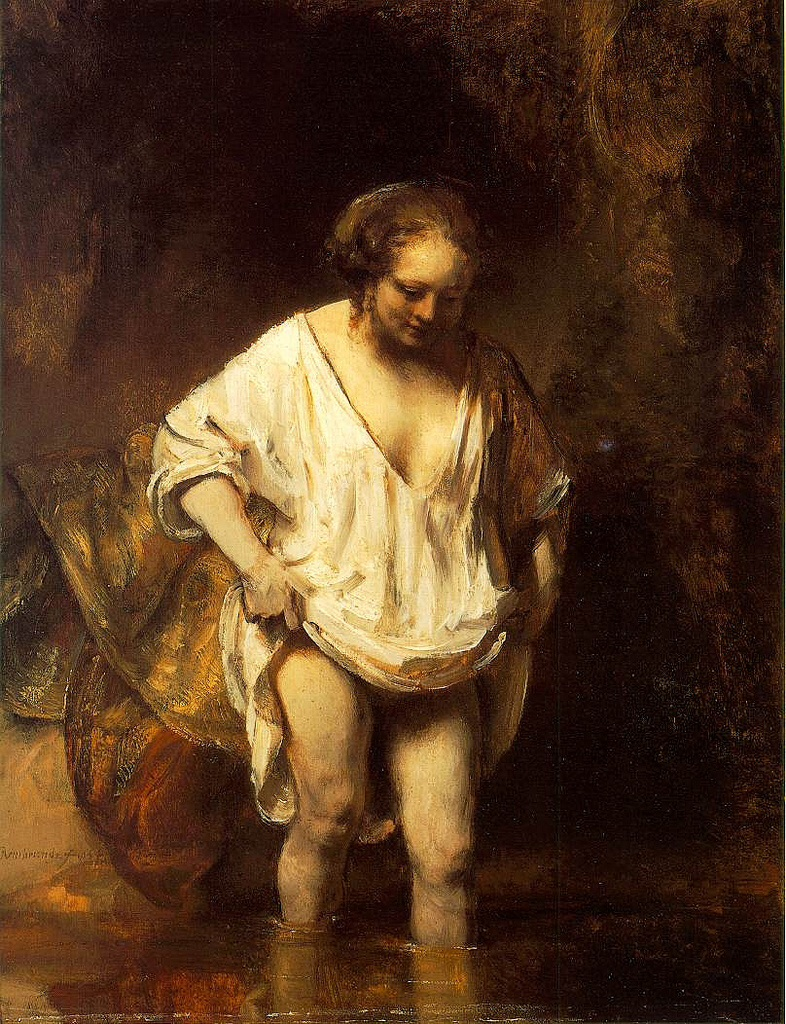
- Artist: Rembrandt
- Year: 1654
- Medium: Oil on panel
- Dimensions: 61.8 cm × 47 cm (24.3 in × 19 in)
- Location: National Gallery, London

Woman Bathing or A Woman Bathing in a Stream is a c. 1654 painting by Rembrandt, now in the National Gallery, London, which acquired it in 1831. It was probably modelled on Rembrandt's partner Hendrickje Stoffels, and represents a woman in a vulnerable state, stepping into her bath. Some scholars believe the painting is meant to represent the nymph Callisto, bathing apart from Diana's entourage.

The painting is broadly executed. Art historian Gary Schwartz refers to it as an "oil sketch enlarged to the dimensions of a full-scale painting" and calls it "one of the freshest and most original of Rembrandt's works in oil."

== See also ==
- List of paintings by Rembrandt
