= Madonna of the Basket (Rubens) =

Painting by Peter Paul Rubens

Madonna della Cesta
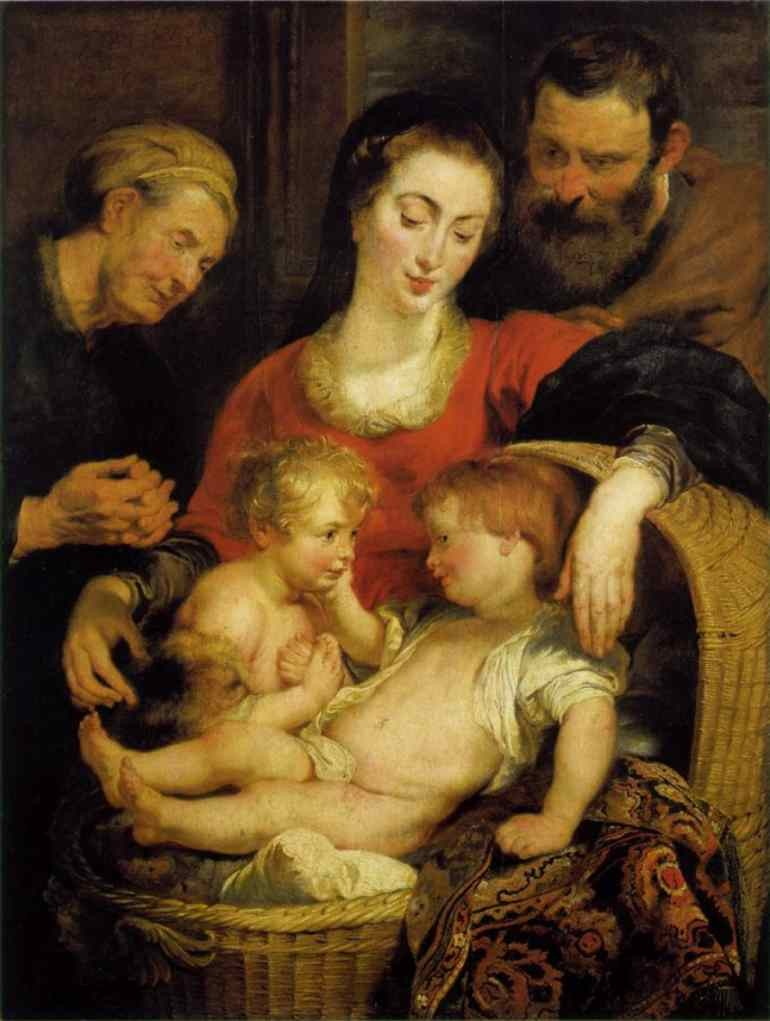
- Artist: Peter Paul Rubens
- Year: 1615
- Medium: oil on panel
- Dimensions: 114 cm × 88 cm (45 in × 35 in)
- Location: Palatine Gallery, Florence

The Madonna of the Basket or the Madonna della Cesta is a painting by Peter Paul Rubens, dated to around 1615. It is now held in the Galleria Palatina of the Palazzo Pitti in Florence. Between 1799 and 1815 it was confiscated by the French and assigned to the Dijon Museum of Fine Arts.

== History ==
The oldest mentions of the work are recorded to the Villa del Poggio Imperiale in 1654–1655, then from 1697, at the Palazzo Pitti in the "Parrot Room." The work was registered in various other rooms until, in 1799, French inspectors sent the work to Paris, where it was stored at the Dijon Museum of Fine Arts. The painting remained there until the end of 1815 and was returned to Florence the following year.

A copy of the work was found in a private collection in Vienna, with the signature of "L. Burchard" and of greater quality than the Florentine version. Another, more modest, copy can be seen in the Galleria di Palazzo Spinola in Genova, which is attributed to Jacob Jordaens.

== Description and style ==
The basket that gives the work its traditional name is, in reality, the wicker cradle in which the baby Jesus rests, watched over by Mary and Joseph. He tenderly caresses the face of John the Baptist, recognizable by the fur coat of a desert hermit. Behind him stands his mother, Saint Elizabeth. Joseph's mature, but not old, age suggests he was made to seem more like a saint.

Inspired by Italian works, the work is marked by the influence of Parmigianino, in the face of Mary. The fluid disposition of the people, the mastery of color and effects of brushstrokes, and the characterization of the people (like the resplendent hair, the opacity of Joseph's beard, and the material effect in the carpet under the baby Jesus) make this a small masterpiece that exemplifies the best work of Rubens.

It is one of the better compositions on this religious subject realized around 1615, along with the painting at the Wallace Collection in London, which is dated to c. 1614.

== Bibliography ==
- Marco Chiarini, Galleria palatina e Appartamenti Reali, Sillabe, Livorno 1998. ISBN 978-88-86392-48-8
