= Saint Agatha (Zurbarán) =

Painting by Francisco de Zurbarán

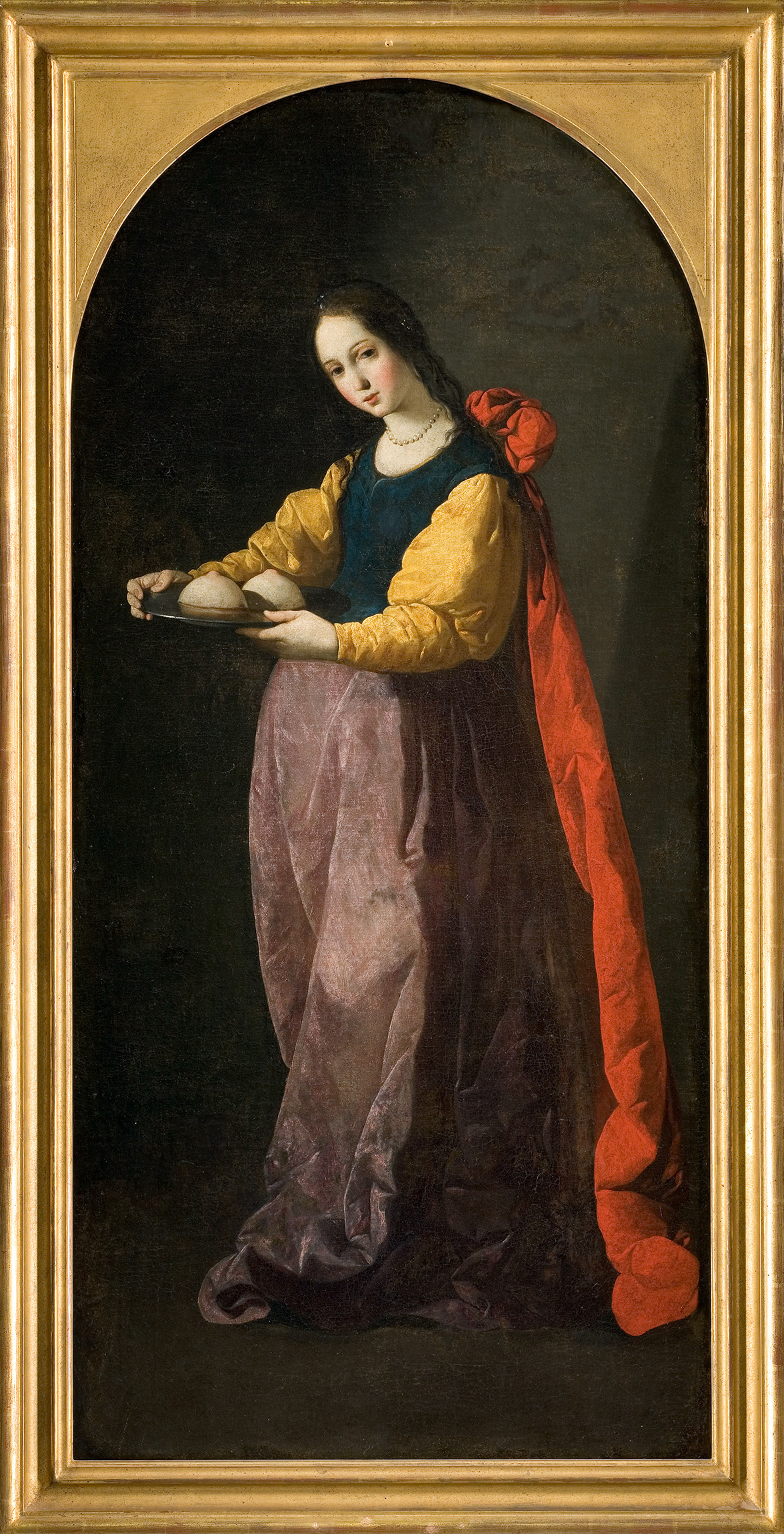
- Artist: Francisco de Zurbarán
- Year: 1630-1633
- Location: Musée Fabre, Montpellier

Saint Agatha is a 1630–1633 painting by Francisco de Zurbarán, bought by the French town of Montpellier in 1852 for 1540 francs and now in the city's Musée Fabre.
