= Christ Taking Leave of His Mother (Altdorfer) =

Painting by Albrecht Altdorfer

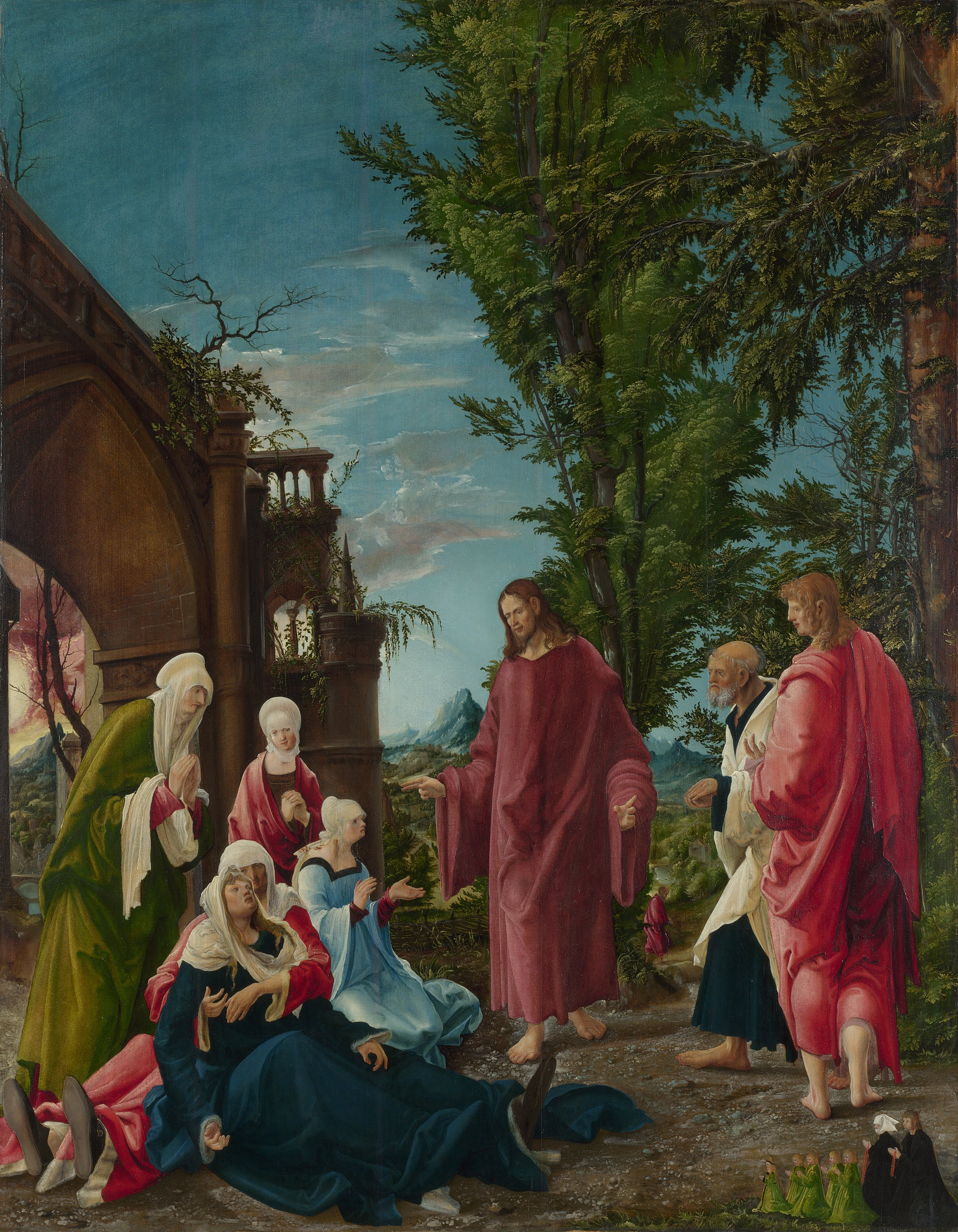
- Artist: Albrecht Altdorfer
- Year: c. 1520
- Medium: tempera on wooden panel
- Dimensions: 141 cm × 111 cm (56 in × 44 in)
- Location: National Gallery; London

Christ Taking Leave of His Mother is a tempera on panel painting by German artist Albrecht Altdorfer. It was executed c. 1520 and is held at the National Gallery in London.

== Description ==
In the painting, Altdorfer presents a group of the most important figures of the New Testament. In the central part, Jesus is blessing his Mother. The gesture of his hand is to calm the rest of the women who mourn over the coming events. Among the women, apart from the fainting Mary, dressed in a navy blue robe, are Mary, mother of James embracing her, a kneeling Mary Magdalen, Mary of Clopas and Mary Salome. On the left side of Christ, St. Peter and St. John appear seemingly more at peace with the Savior's future fate. All characters are depicted in a very earthly way, and the emotions of individual people are expressed through unnaturally elongated bodies, large feet, hand gestures and simplicity of faces. Altdorfer completely ignored the rules of form, perspective, and proportion. The landscape, divided into two parts, harmonizes with the mood of the scene. On the left, there are dry branches of a withered tree symbolizing the Passion of the Lord, on the right, the lush vegetation announces the New Covenant.

At the bottom of the painting, on the right, miniature figures of the painter's donors are visible.

== See also ==
- List of landscapes by Albrecht Altdorfer
