= A Man with a Quilted Sleeve =

Painting by Titian

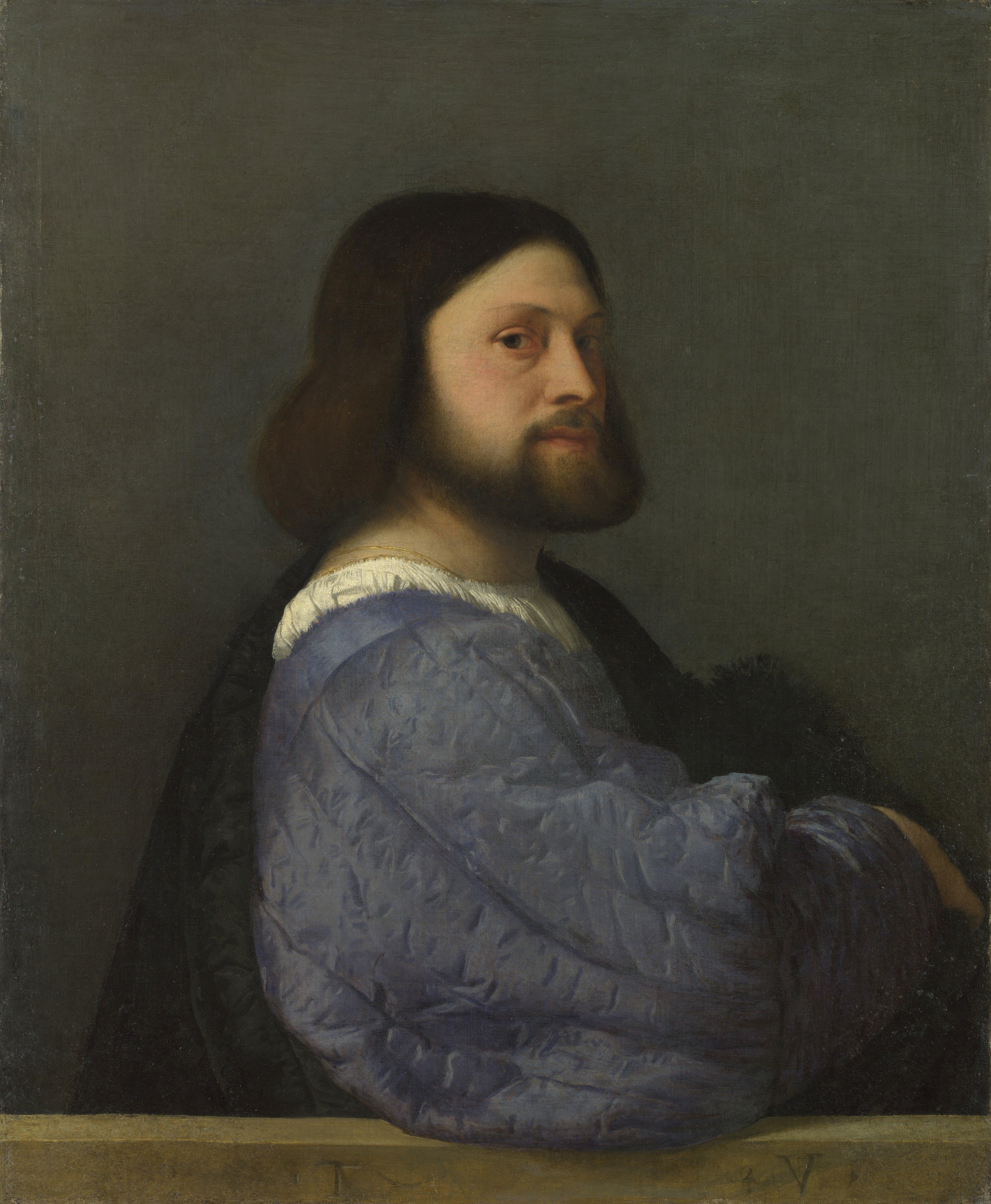
- Artist: Titian
- Year: c. 1510
- Catalogue: NG1944
- Medium: Oil on canvas
- Dimensions: 81.2 cm × 66.3 cm (32.0 in × 26.1 in)
- Location: National Gallery, London

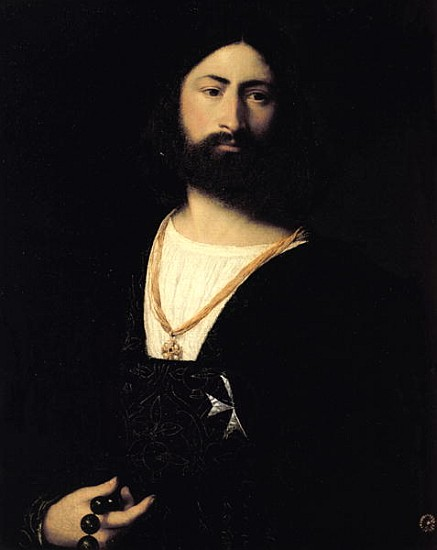
Titian, portrait of an unknown Knight of Malta, c. 1508, Uffizi

A Man with a Quilted Sleeve is a painting of about 1510 by the Venetian painter Titian in the National Gallery, London, measuring 81.2 by 66.3 centimetres (32.0 in × 26.1 in). Though the quality of the painting has always been praised, there has been much discussion as to the identity of the sitter. It was long thought to be a portrait of Ariosto, then a self-portrait, but since 2017 has been called Portrait of Gerolamo (?) Barbarigo by the gallery, having also been called merely Portrait of a Man, the title used here, The Man with the Blue Sleeve, and no doubt other variants.

Placing a parapet, a low wood or stone sill or ledge, between the subject and the viewer is a common feature of early Renaissance Italian portraits, as a useful way of solving "the principal compositional problem" of portraits at less than full-length, how "to justify the cutting of the figure". By having the large sleeve project slightly beyond the parapet, Titian "subverts" the usual barrier effect, bringing the picture space into "our space" as viewers. The turning pose, with the head slightly atilt and an eyebrow appearing raised, exactly halfway across the composition, adds life and drama. The "broad spiral motion in depth of the head and arm" suggests that Titian had some awareness of contemporary developments in painting in Florence. The sleeve is brilliantly painted, and the "merging of the shadowed portions of the figure with the grey atmospheric background ... is one of the most innovative and influential aspects of the painting".

The painting comes from a crucial period in the development of the Italian Renaissance portrait, which was then being led by Venice. According to John Steer, Titian retains the "mood of generalized inner mystery" that Giorgione had brought to his portraits (which may not represent individuals who commissioned the painting) but shows the personality and "physical assurance" of his sitter with new force and realism. To some extent the "ardent gaze" of this and other figures is adopted from paintings of religious subjects.

The pose was borrowed in two self-portraits by Rembrandt, who saw the painting (or a copy) in Amsterdam. Soon after, it apparently moved to England via France. It entered the National Gallery in 1904 as NG1944, and in 2017 was on display in Room 2.

== Attribution, date and condition ==
The work's attribution and dating are based on its style, its ambiguous signature, and comparison with other Titian works, such as La Schiavona. The dates assigned have all been in the period of about 1509–1512; a painting in the Hermitage Museum that is "obviously inspired by it" is dated 1512. According to Nicholas Penny, the Man with a Quilted Sleeve may be Titian's earliest portrait, apart from a Knight of Malta in the Uffizi.

The widely spaced letters "T V" appear as though carved into the stone parapet either side of the sleeve, with triangular dots around them. They are usually taken as Titian's initials (his name was "Tiziano Vecellio"), though there is a second V visible in infrared reflectography, so the painting once might have carried "the mysterious abbreviation "VV"". This appears on various Venetian portraits of around this date, including several works attributed to Giorgione, such as the Giustiniani Portrait or the Gentleman with a book, as well as Titian's La Schiavona. Various moral mottos, such as "virtus vincit (omnia)" ("virtue conquers all") have been proposed as the meaning. "VV" is not usually regarded as a signature, but "TV" might be Titian's. Before cleaning and restoration the signature had been added to by a later hand, so that it read TITIANUS and a monogram with the overlapping letters "TV". Like many others, the painting was at times attributed to Giorgione, well into the 20th century.

The painting was cleaned in 1949, when the later parts of the signature were painted over. The blue sleeve is well preserved, parts of the face and the area around the hand are rubbed, and the sill is "extensively restored". Fine red lines representing threads in the fabric of the sleeve have now faded, and the effect of the "hollows and dimples" on its surface is somewhat reduced by "blanching" that reduces their contrast to the rest of the sleeve. Scientific imaging reveals only a little very confident underdrawing.

== Identity of sitter ==
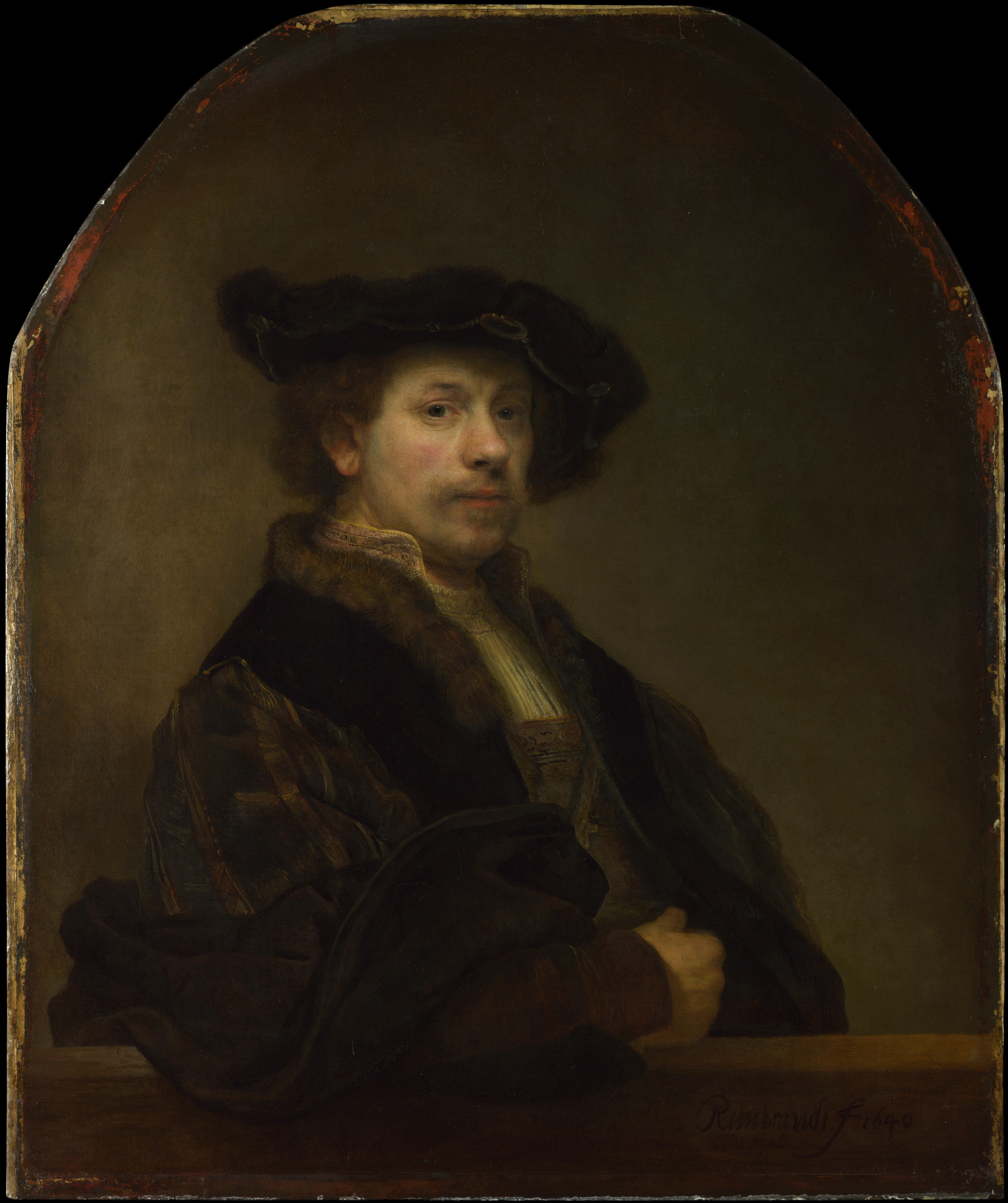
Rembrandt Self-portrait at the age of 34, 1640 (also National Gallery)

From at least the 1630s until the late 19th century it was thought to be a portrait of the poet Ludovico Ariosto, but this is dismissed by all modern critics. Even when it entered the National Gallery in 1904 it was only "tentatively" so identified, as it does not resemble other portraits of Ariosto, such as (probably) one by Palma Vecchio also in the Gallery.

It was first suggested in 1895 (by Jean Paul Richter) that it portrays a man from the Barbarigo family, as a Titian portrait of "a gentleman from the House of Barbarigo, [the artist's] friend, who he held in high esteem", "in a doublet of silvered satin" was described by Vasari in his Life of Titian. The family was then at the height of its power, and had supplied two Doges of Venice in succession from 1485 to 1501.

The Barberigo identification has met with some resistance. Charles Hope, reviewing an exhibition including the piece in the National Gallery in the London Review of Books concluded that claims on early Titian are still too speculative, asking "Why not admit that we still don’t know very much about Venetian painting in the first decade of the 16th century, instead of pretending to a knowledge that we do not possess?" Nonetheless, this theory was supported by the National Gallery in the title they used in 2017; Gerolamo Barberigo, who became thirty in 1509 at the time the portrait was painted, has been chosen as the most likely member of the family to be represented. Thirty was the age at which patrician Venetian men became qualified for significant political roles, and perhaps a good moment to commission a portrait. There is another portrait, in Alnwick Castle and usually attributed to Palma Vecchio, which might show the same sitter and also be by Titian.

Cecil Gould and Kenneth Clark thought that the painting might be a self-portrait by Titian; there are no other certain ones from before his old age with which to compare the likeness. The pose is convenient for a right-handed artist painting himself in a mirror, and the convex mirrors of the day may have lengthened the face slightly, and account for the slightly supercilious air of the subject, seeming to look down his nose at the viewer. At this point in his career Titian was becoming known as a portrait painter, and might have wished to advertise his skill to future clients by having a self-portrait to show them.

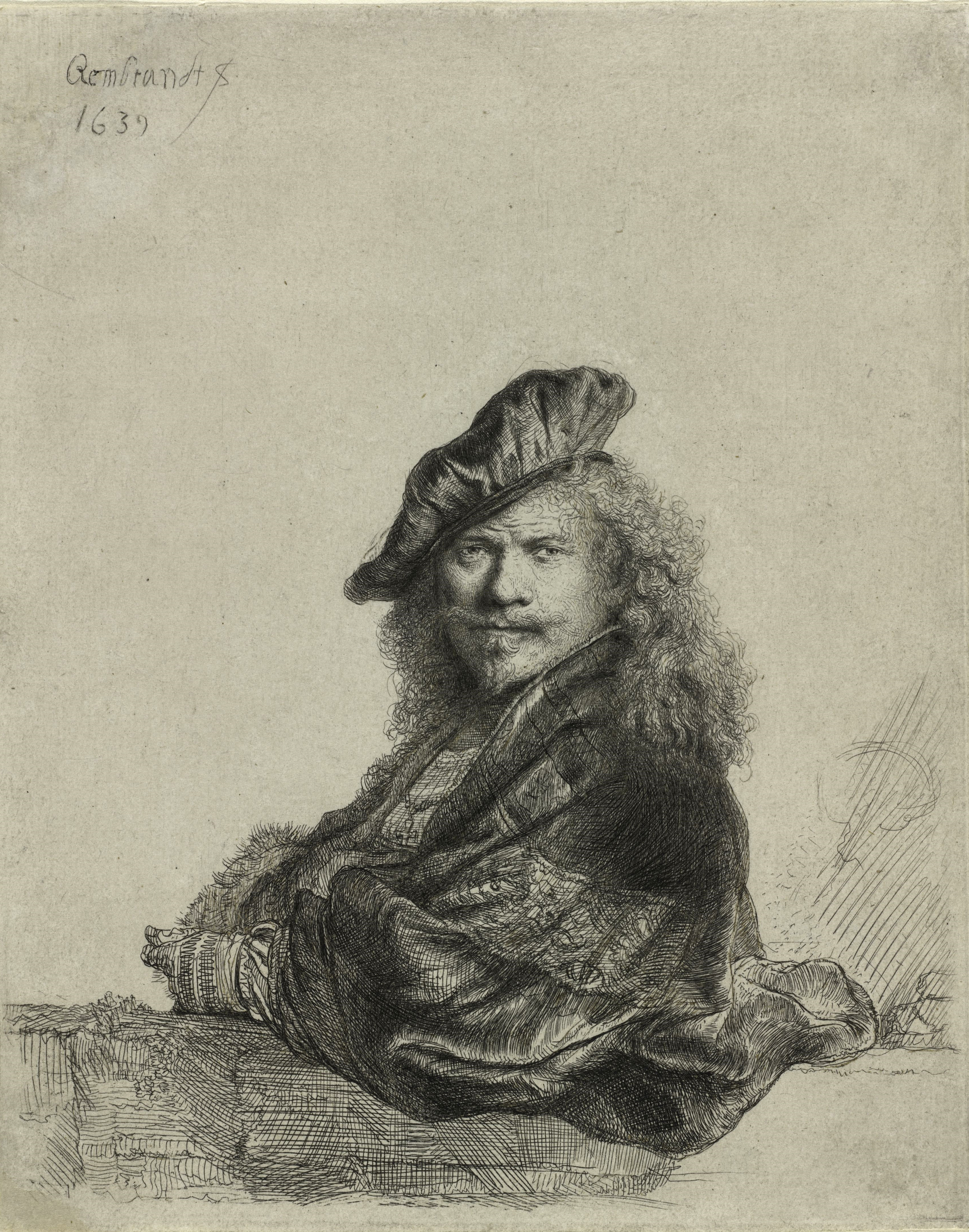
Rembrandt, Self-portrait leaning on a Sill, etching, 1639

Rembrandt saw the painting in Amsterdam and the next year copied the pose in his Self-portrait at the age of 34 (also National Gallery) as well as a self-portrait etching of 1639, Self-portrait leaning on a Sill (Bartsch number B21). In both of these, as in many others of his self-portraits, his costume is in many ways more from Titian's period than his own.

== Provenance ==
The work, or possibly a copy of it, was part of the collection of Alfonso Lopez, an art dealer in Amsterdam in 1639, where Rembrandt would have seen it, and it was engraved, with an inscribed identification as Ariosto. Still identified as Ariosto, it was apparently sold in Paris in December 1641, and a letter survives written to a friend to advise Anthony van Dyck it was up for sale, and praising it. Van Dyck may have arranged to buy it, though he would have been dead before it arrived, as he died in London on 9 December 1641. But a Titian portrait of Ariosto is mentioned in the inventory of his estate. It was possibly bought by Charles I – a Titian portrait of Ariosto was listed in a catalogue of his goods in 1644, perhaps from van Dyck's estate.

The first certain appearance of the present picture was in the collection of John Bligh, 4th Earl of Darnley at Cobham Hall by 1824; he and his successors exhibited it several times, at the British Institution, the Art Treasures Exhibition, Manchester 1857, and the Royal Academy, and it became well-known, as did a version once at Mentmore Towers that is now regarded as a copy.

It was sold to Sir George Donaldson in 1904. After some negotiation, the National Gallery acquired it from Donaldson for £30,000, the price he had paid for it, with contributions from Lord Iveagh, Waldorf Astor, John Pierpont Morgan, Alfred Beit, the government, and others. The sale marked something of a turning-point, after two decades or more when outstanding works from aristocratic British collections had been allowed to cross the Atlantic, though there was a precedent in 1890, with a government grant of £25,000 for a group bought from the Earl of Radnor, including Hans Holbein the Younger's The Ambassadors. Similar arrangements would bring Holbein's Portrait of Christina of Denmark (1909, £72,000) and Jan Gossaert's Adoration of the Kings (1911, £40,000) to the National Gallery.

== See also ==
- List of works by Titian
