= Minerva Protecting Peace from Mars =

Painting by Peter Paul Rubens

Minerva protects Pax from Mars
- Peace and War
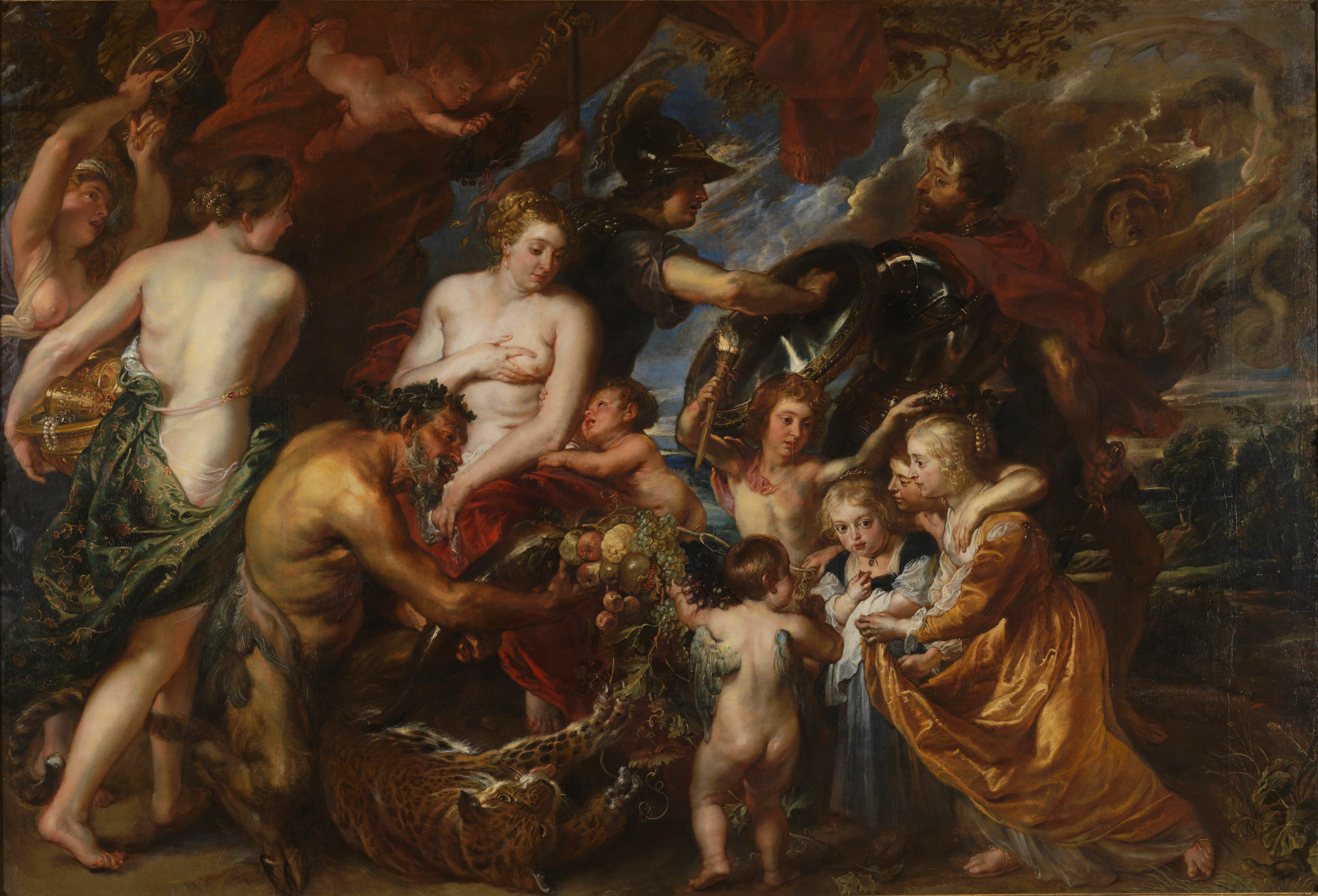
- Artist: Peter Paul Rubens
- Year: 1629–30
- Medium: Oil on canvas
- Dimensions: 203.5 cm × 298 cm (80.1 in × 117 in)
- Location: National Gallery, London

Minerva protecting Peace from Mars or Peace and War is a painting by Peter Paul Rubens. He produced it in London between 1629 and 1630, during a diplomatic mission from the Spanish Netherlands to Charles I of England. It is now in the National Gallery, London.

It shows Minerva (goddess of war, wisdom and crafts) fighting off Mars, with the nude figure of the goddess Pax (commonly known as "Peace" in English) in the centre.
