= San Benedetto, Florence =

Roman Catholic former parish church then oratory in Tuscany, Italy

Coordinates: 43°46′20″N 11°15′26″E

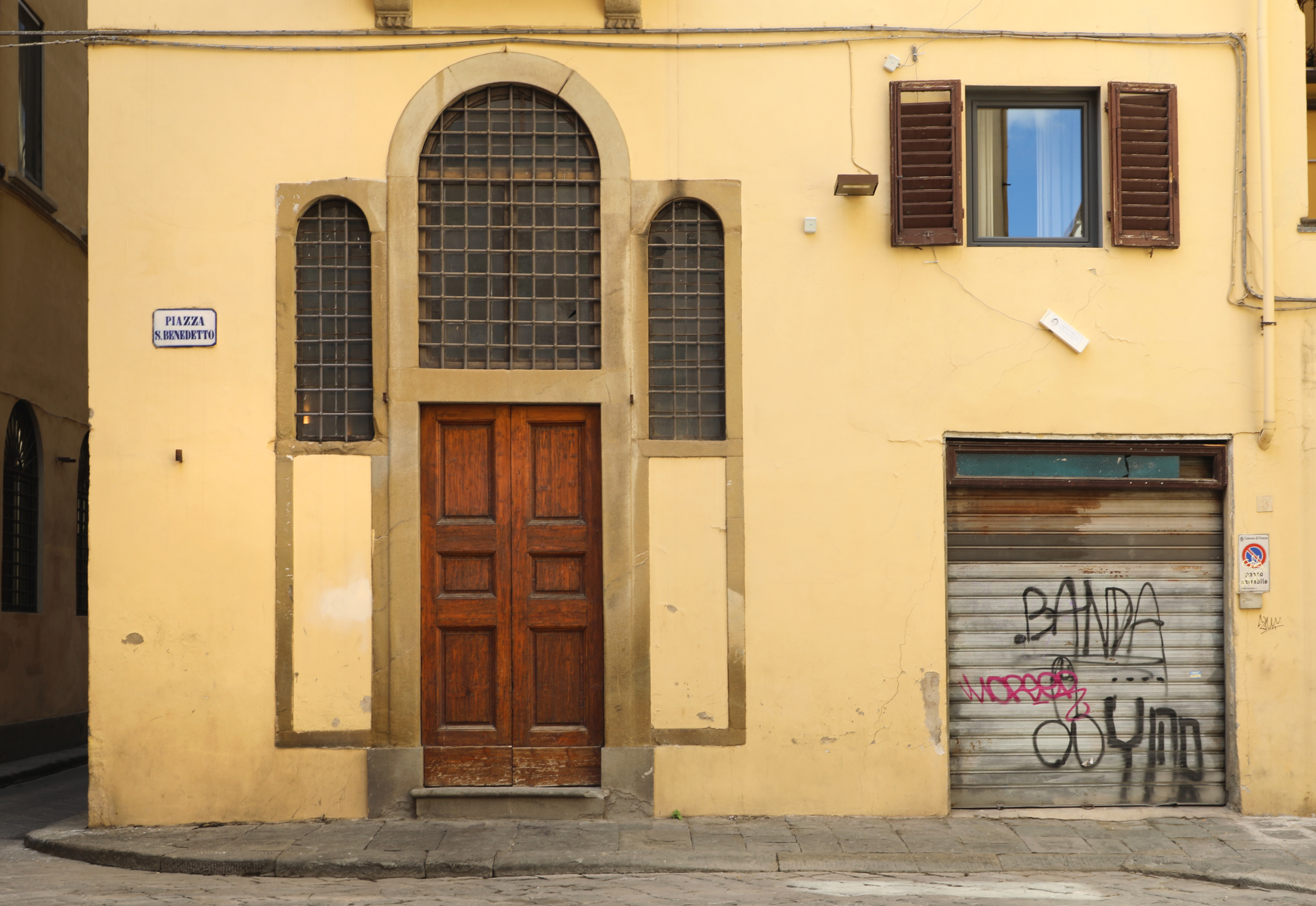
San Benedetto, old entrance

San Benedetto is a small, Roman Catholic former parish church, then oratory, located in a piazza of the same name just off the piazza of the Duomo of Florence, region of Tuscany, Italy.

== History ==
The church was founded around the year 1000, but transferred from parish to a confraternity. It was suppressed in 1771, and still retains a chapel with an altarpiece depicting the Miracle of San Zanobi, attributed to Bernardo Veracini.

== See also ==
- Zenobius of Florence
