= Portrait of Doña Isabel de Porcel =

Painting by Francisco de Goya

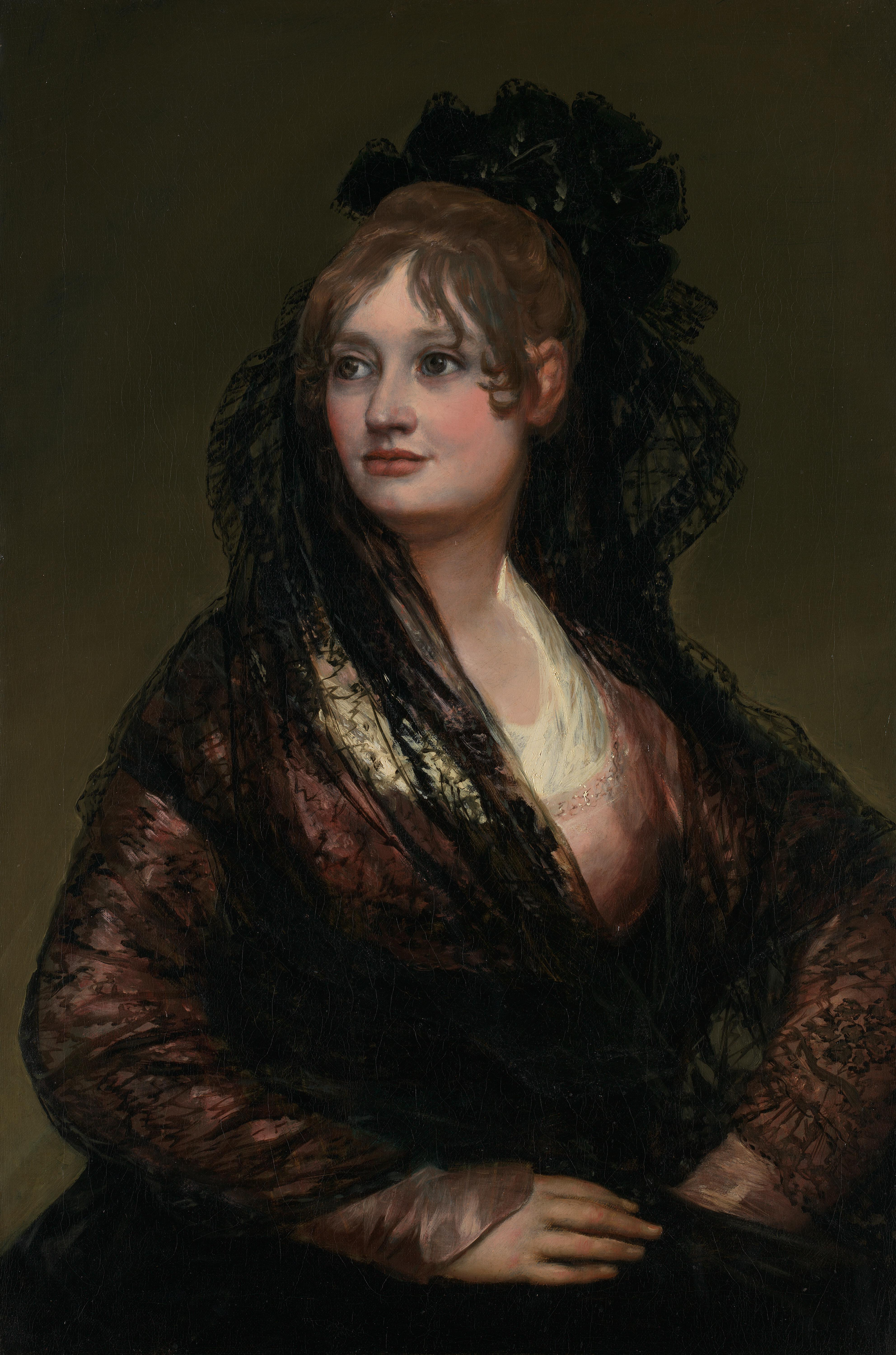
- Artist: Francisco de Goya
- Year: 1805
- Medium: Oil on canvas
- Dimensions: 82 cm × 54.6 cm (32 in × 21.5 in)
- Location: National Gallery, London

The Portrait of Doña Isabel de Porcel is an oil-on-canvas painting by the Spanish artist Francisco de Goya, painted around 1805. The portrait depicts Isabel Lobo Velasco de Porcel, who was born at Ronda around 1780 and was the second wife of Antonio Porcel. Isabel's husband was 25 years older than she; they met when she was 20 years old. Antonio Porcel was a liberal and associate of Manuel Godoy, Prince of Peace, who was a friend of Gaspar Melchor de Jovellanos, who in turn brought him in contact with Goya, who lived nearby; the painting is said to have been a gift from the artist in return for hospitality. A Goya portrait of Antonio Porcel, though much larger and so not a matching piece, was lost in a fire when the Jockey Club in Buenos Aires was destroyed in a riot in 1953.

The half-length portrait depicts a young woman dressed in typical Spanish attire, a white shirt and a black mantilla. In spite of her "maja" attire, the richness of the textiles and her ladylike appearance give the picture an aristocratic elegance; at this time wealthy Spanish "people of fashion" often wore the styles of lower class urban dandies and their female equivalents, as seen in Goya's famous clothed version of La Maja.

The decisive gesture of her arms in the akimbo position and her confidence stand out. Her eyes and hair are light brown, her skin is pale, and her body is slightly turned to the left side, while her head gives balance by being turned to the opposite side. Goya achieves realism and deepness without adding secondary objects to the composition. One of the unique aspects of this painting is that the woman is looking towards the left side of the viewer and not towards him, which is the case of the majority of Goya's paintings.

The picture is used in several episodes of the 1967 BBC serialisation of The Forsyte Saga.

Some scholars have recently cast doubts over its attribution.

== See also ==
- List of works by Francisco Goya
