= Mr and Mrs William Hallett =

Painting by Thomas Gainsborough

- The Morning Walk
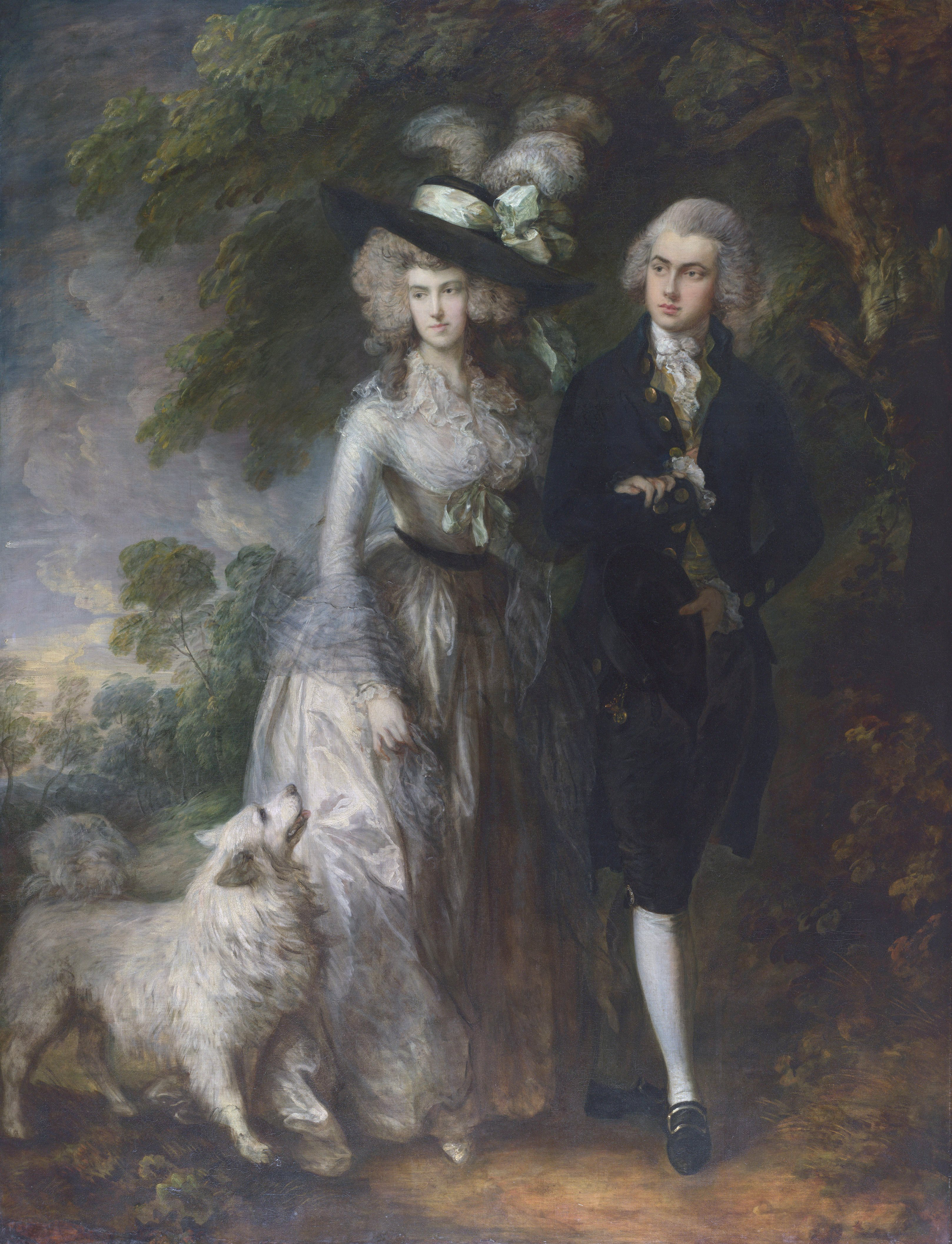
- Artist: Thomas Gainsborough
- Year: 1785
- Medium: Oil on canvas
- Dimensions: 236.2 cm × 179.1 cm (93.0 in × 70.5 in)
- Location: National Gallery; London

Mr and Mrs William Hallett (or The Morning Walk) is an oil on canvas painting by the British painter Thomas Gainsborough, from 1785. It is held in the National Gallery, in London (NG 6209).

== Background ==
Gainsborough painted the work in the summer of 1785, when the subjects, William Hallett (1764–1842) and Elizabeth Stephen (1763/4-1833) were both aged 21, shortly before their wedding at the church of St Lawrence in Little Stanmore on 30 July 1785. Gainsborough was commissioned by Hallett, and paid 120 guineas (£126).

Hallett was the grandson of a successful cabinetmaker, also named William Hallett, and inherited his estate at Canons Park in Middlesex. Stephen was an heiress, inheriting nearly £20,000 from her father, a surgeon, who had died before the marriage. The couple never lived at Canons Park: by 1788, Hallett had let Canons and had bought the estate of Little Wittenham in Berkshire, but they resided at Faringdon House in Oxfordshire for almost 20 years. Hallett was a gambler, lost money in business transactions, and worked his way through his fortune by 1830, although the marriage was reportedly a happy one. They were married for almost 48 years, with two sons and four daughters. Hallett remarried after Elizabeth's death in 1833.

After his death in 1842, William was buried next to Elizabeth in the churchyard of the church where they had been married decades before.

== Description ==
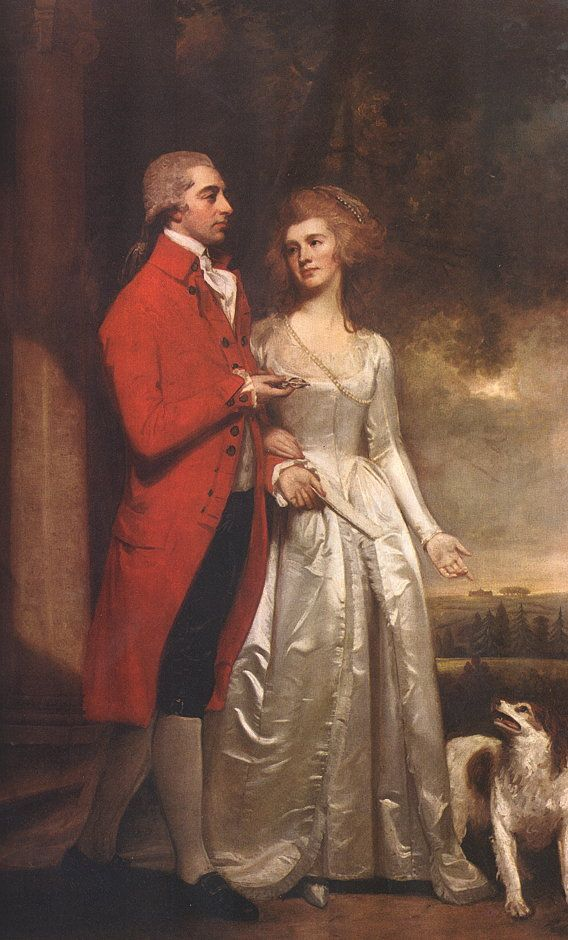
Sir Christopher and Lady Sykes by George Romney, 1786, known as The Evening Walk, Sledmere House

The couple are captured with the typical feathery brushwork of Gainsborough's late career, walking arm in arm along a path through some woods, accompanied by a Pomeranian sheepdog (then commonly known from its head shape as a "fox dog", more closely related to the German Spitz or the Samoyed dog than the much smaller modern Pomeranian dog) . The couple may be wearing their wedding clothes, with Elizabeth in a gown of billowing ivory silk with lace cuffs, gathered at the waist with black silk, with a green ribbon tied at the breast echoed by the large green bow tied around a wide-brimmed black hat topped by ostrich plumes. William is wearing a black velvet frock coat, with large gold buttons and a green and yellow waistcoat; black breeches, white stockings, and buckled shoes; and carrying a plain black hat.

== Provenance ==
After Mrs Hallett's death the painting was offered for sale at Foster's in 1834, though it remained unsold. Hallett bequeathed it to his daughter Lettice Elizabeth, who was married to Nash Crosier Hilliard (son of the MP Edward Hilliard). It was inherited by their son William Edward Hilliard and included in the Gainsborough exhibition at the British Institution in 1859, when it was lauded in The Times as a "perfect realisation of youthful elegance and high breeding", and in the 1862 International Exhibition.

In April 1884 it was sold from the estate of the sitters' grandson William Edward Hilliard to Agnew's, who sold it on, eight days later, to Sir N. M. Rothschild (later Lord Rothschild). The painting was acquired for the National Gallery in 1954, from the collection of Lord Rothschild, for £30,000, the Art Fund providing a grant of £5000 towards the purchase price.

On 18 March 2017, the painting was attacked by a man with a sharp object. The painting received two scratches of about 1 m (3 ft 3 in) and 65 cm (2 ft 2 in) long in the incident, crossing in the lower half of the figure of Mrs Hallett, but the canvas was not pierced. After 10 days of restoration, the painting went back on display.

== Influence ==
Gainsborough's composition was the inspiration for George Romney's portrait of Sir Christopher and Lady Sykes, known as The Evening Walk, still at the Sykes family's house, Sledmere House.
