= Self-Portrait at the Age of 34 =

1640 painting by Rembrandt

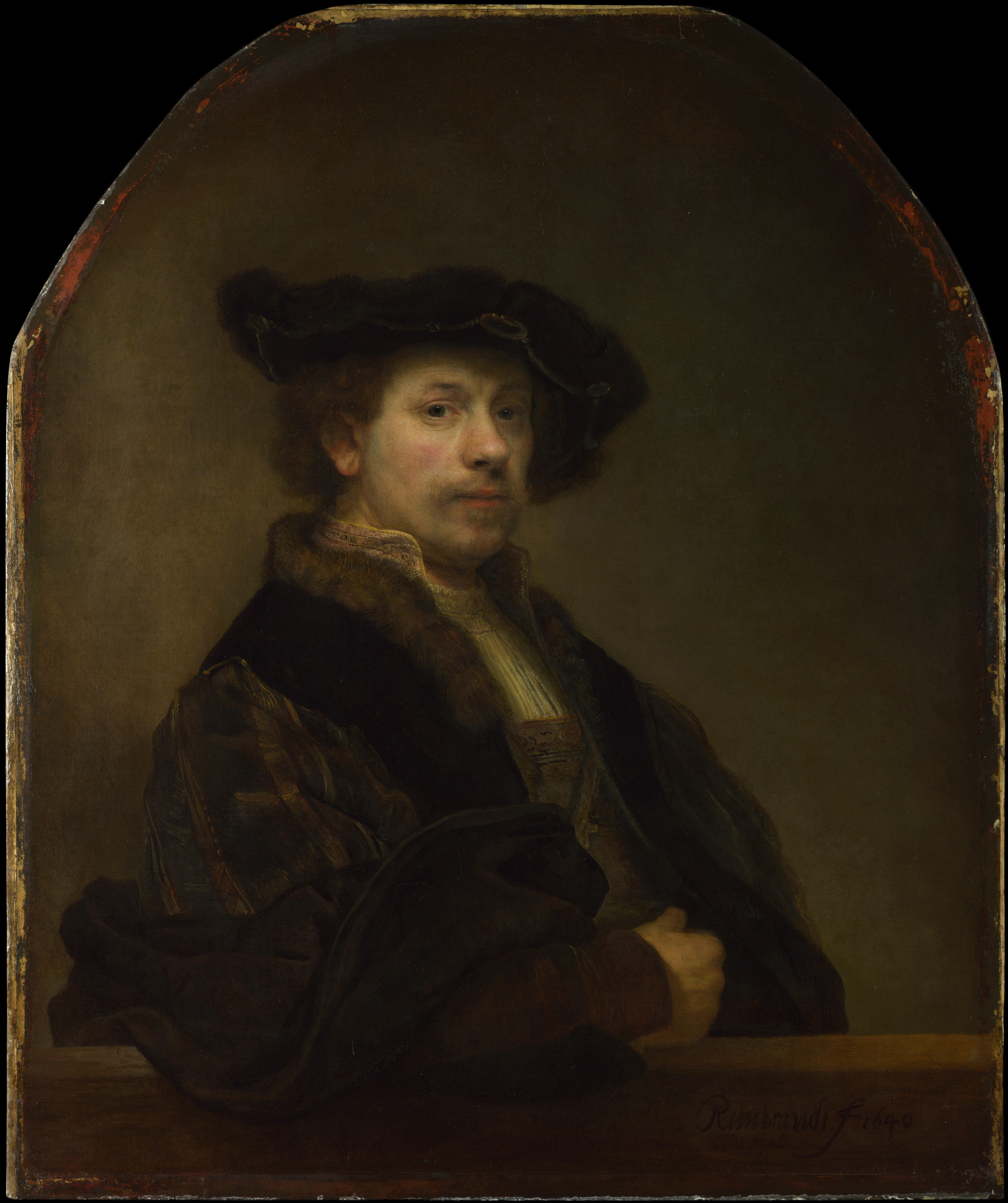
- Artist: Rembrandt
- Year: 1640
- Medium: Oil on canvas
- Dimensions: 102 cm × 80 cm (40 in × 31 in)
- Location: National Gallery; London
- Accession: NG672

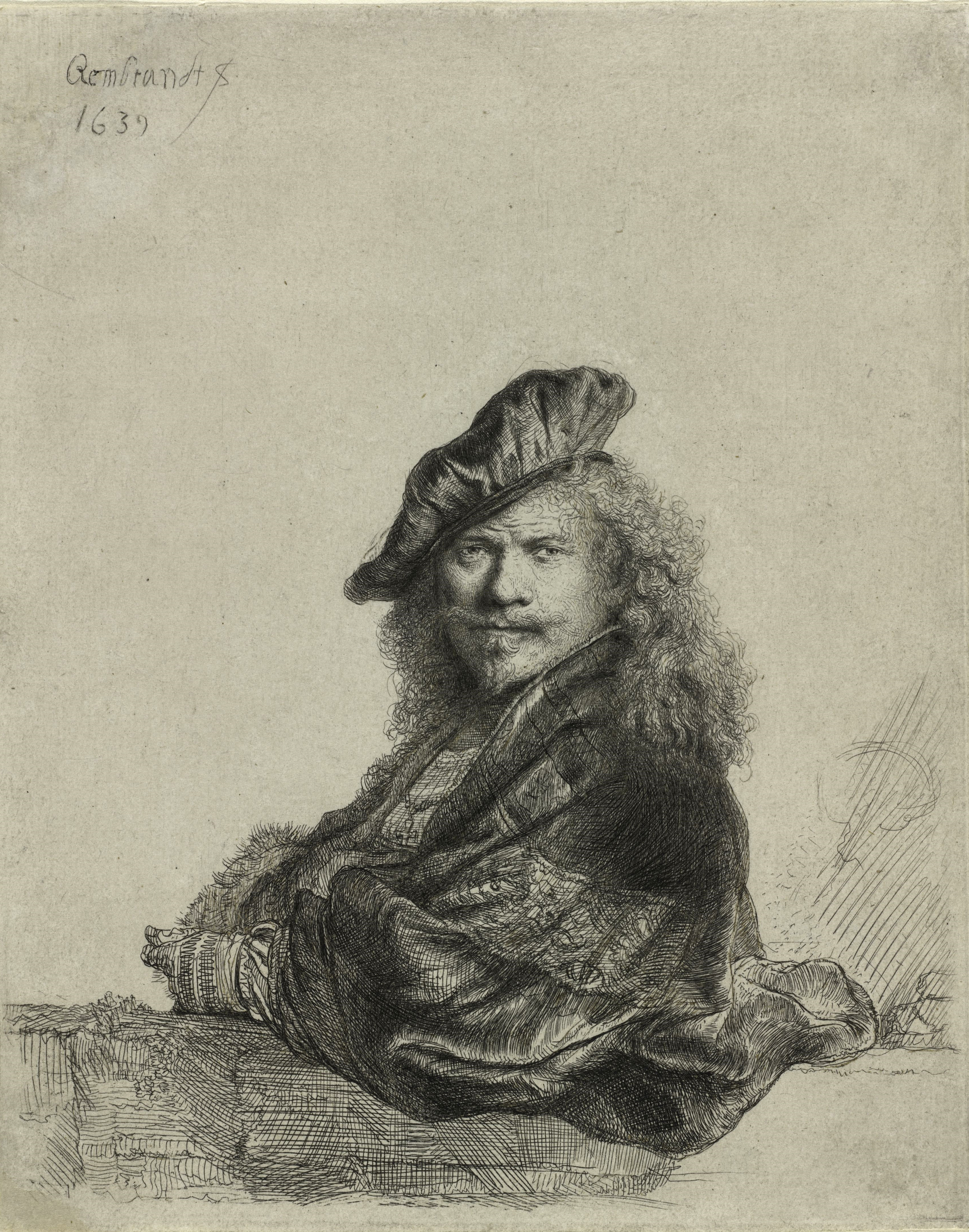
B21, Self-portrait leaning on a Sill, etching, 1639, 2 states. The pose draws on portraits by Titian and Raphael, A Man with a Quilted Sleeve (NG, London) and Portrait of Baldassare Castiglione (Louvre) respectively.

Self-Portrait at the Age of 34 is a self-portrait by Rembrandt, dating to 1640 and now in the National Gallery in London. The painting is one of many self-portraits by Rembrandt, in both painting and etching, to show the artist in a fancy costume from the previous century. In this case specific influences in the pose have long been recognised from Raphael's Portrait of Baldassare Castiglione (now Louvre) and Titian's A Man with a Quilted Sleeve (in 2017 called Portrait of Gerolamo? Barbarigo) in the National Gallery. Rembrandt saw both of these in Amsterdam, in his day the centre of Europe's art trade, and made a sketch of the Raphael, with its price.

He had tried out a similar pose in an etching of 1639, Self Portrait, Leaning on a Stone Wall (B21), looking rather more rakish.

The artist depicted himself at the height of his career, richly dressed and self-secure. It is one of over forty painted self-portraits by Rembrandt.

== Painting materials ==
The scientific analysis of this painting by the scientists at the National Gallery in London revealed the use of the following pigments by Rembrandt: lead white, bone black, charcoal black, ochres and vermilion.

== See also ==
- List of paintings by Rembrandt
