= Madonna of the Basket (Correggio) =

Painting by Correggio

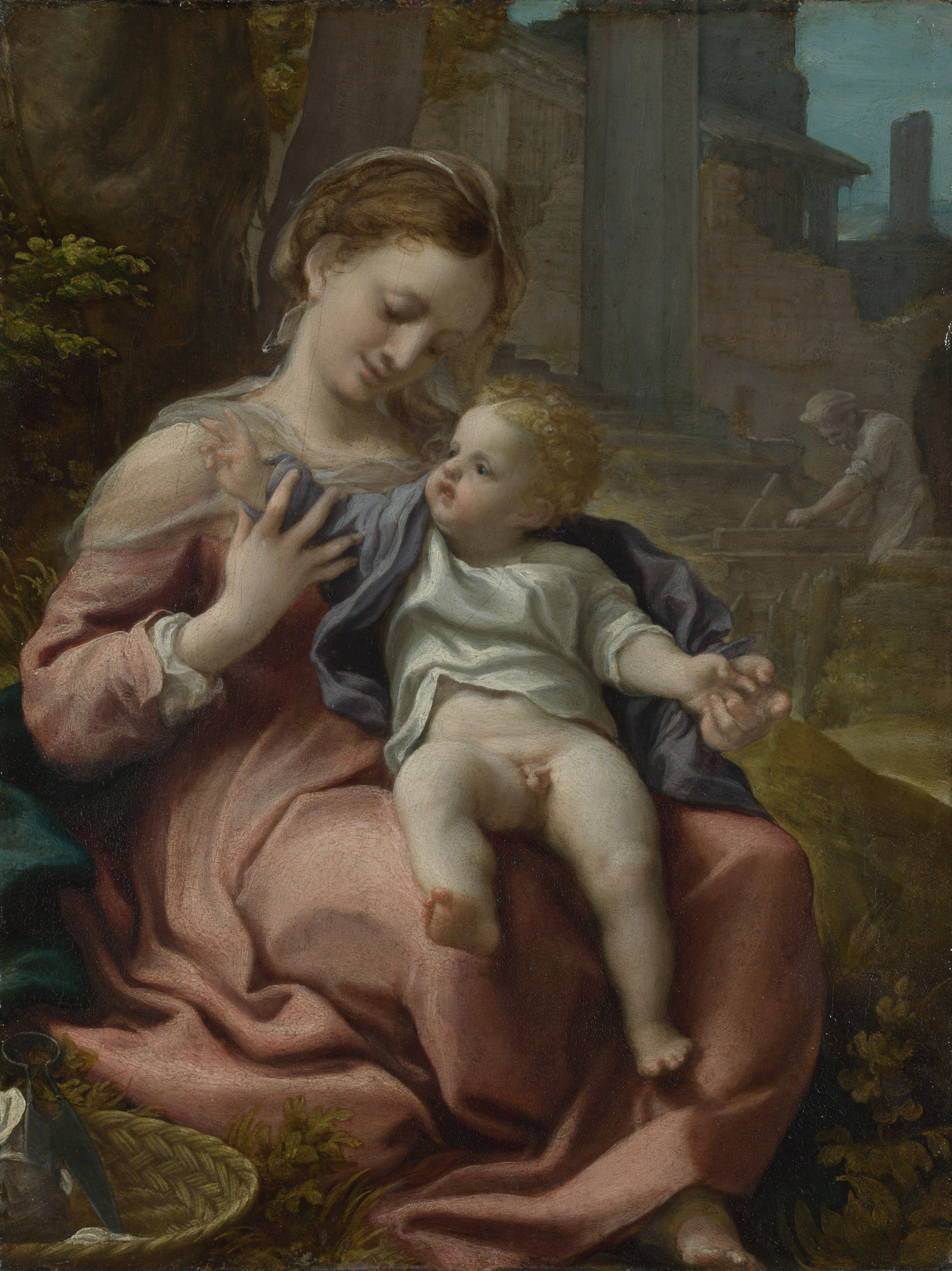
- Artist: Antonio da Correggio
- Year: c. 1524
- Catalogue: NG23
- Medium: Oil on wood
- Dimensions: 33.7 cm × 25.1 cm (13.3 in × 9.9 in)
- Location: National Gallery, London

The Madonna of the Basket or the Madonna della Cesta is a painting of c. 1524 by Antonio da Correggio in the National Gallery, London. While it is a Mannerist painting of the Virgin Mary and the Baby Jesus, Correggio included naturalist touches in his composition, like the sewing basket that gives the painting its name.

== History ==
This small painting, intended for private devotion, was enthusiastically mentioned in Giorgio Vasari's Le Vite: "Beautiful to admire, by the hand of Correggio, in which Our Lady places a chemise over Baby Jesus." Its provenance is mentioned by Vasari as entering Parma in the first half of the 1500s, brought by French knight Chevalier de Bayard, a client of Parmigianino and an art collector of the time.

Probably thanks to this approving mention, the work was appreciated by the bishop Federico Borromeo, who wished for a copy for his Milan collection and entrusted the task to an illuminator Gerolamo Marchesini. For similar reasons, Diana Scultori in Rome around 1577 created an engraving copy that contributed to the diffusion of the painting's fame. Also from Rome, Federico Barocci created a copy similar to the Madonna Albani.

== Description and style ==
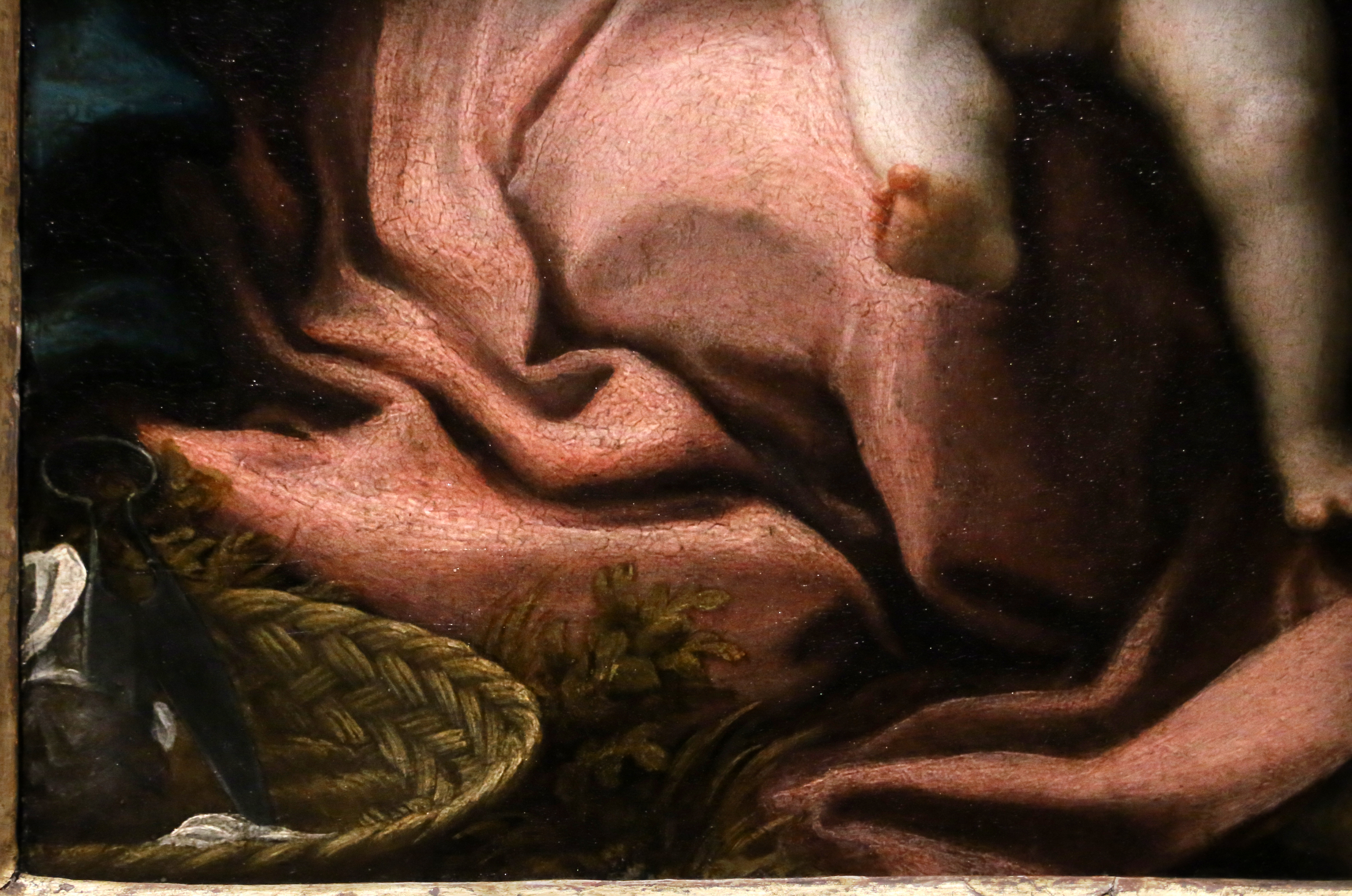
Detail from Madonna of the Basket

Corregio had been attempting to find a less intellectual, artificial style than his contemporary Mannerists—he wanted to find a way of expressing religious art with a fresh and persuasive naturalism. Representing a young Mary, almost adolescent, that has just put down her sewing tools, Correggio places a religious story in the simple frame of everyday life.

The fulcrum of the painting is represented in the affectionate rapport that links Marie and the Baby Jesus; she is trying to dress him with the blue shirt she has just finished sewing. The sewing basket with scissors, clearly visible, opens the painting on the left and gives the symbolic painting a realistic effect. Mary evidently prepared for Jesus a double vestment, which might symbolize his dual nature of humanity and divinity. Jesus' composition hints at his fate. His arms are outstretched in a cross, while his right hand gives a benediction with three raised fingers a symbol of the Trinity.

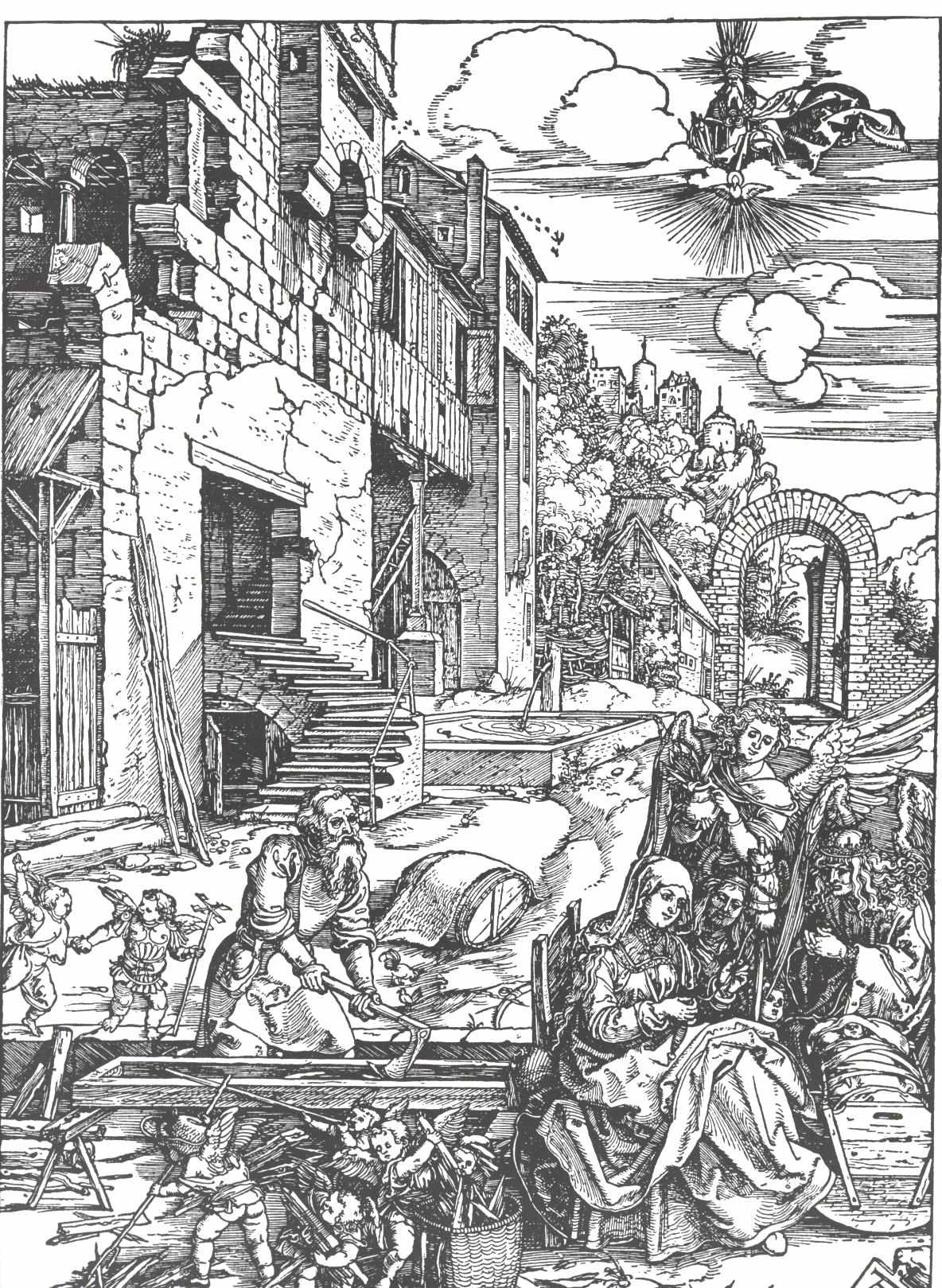
Dürer's The Rest during the Flight to Egypt engraving

The background, where there is a glimpse of Saint Joseph, can be compared to Northern European works, particularly an Dürer engraving that Correggio might have known, The Rest during the Flight to Egypt.

== Bibliography ==
- Adani, Giuseppe (2007). Correggio : pittore universale (1489-1534) : monografia esplicativa e didattica (in Italian). Cinisello Balsamo, Milano: Silvana. ISBN 9788836609772.
