= Gabriele Finaldi =

Director of the National Gallery in London

Sir Gabriele Finaldi
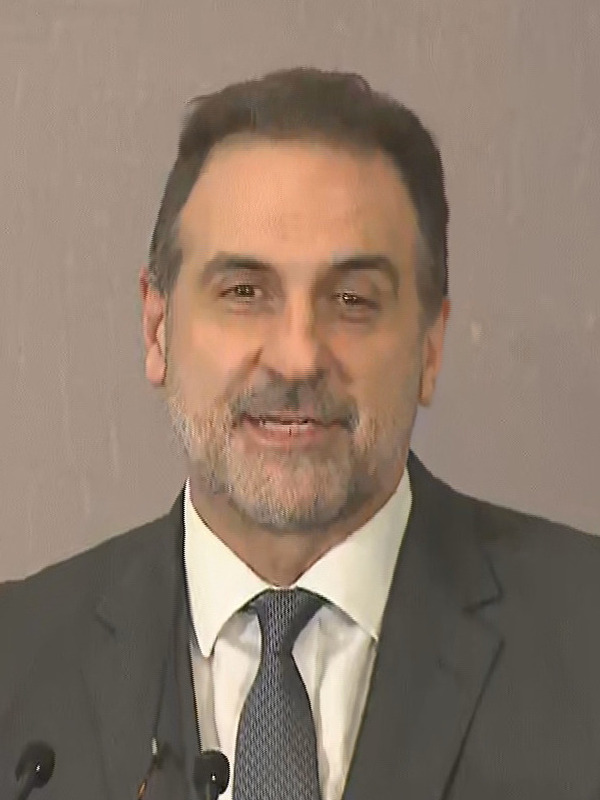
- Finaldi in 2023

Director of the National Gallery
- Incumbent
- Assumed office 17 August 2015
- Preceded by: Sir Nicholas Penny

Personal details
- Born: 28 November 1965 (age 60) Barnet, London
- Education: Dulwich College
- Alma mater: Courtauld Institute of Art
- Occupation: Art historian; Curator
- Awards: Knight Bachelor

Sir Gabriele Maria Finaldi (born 28 November 1965) is a British art historian and curator, with Italian citizenship. Since August 2015, he has been director of the National Gallery in London, England.

== Early life and education ==
Finaldi was born in Barnet and raised in Catford in south London, the son of a Neapolitan father and a half-Polish-half-English mother. He was educated at Dulwich College before studying art history at The Courtauld Institute of Art, where he completed his BA degree in 1987, an MA in 1989 and a PhD in 1995. His doctoral research focused on the 17th-century Spanish Baroque painter Jusepe de Ribera.

== Career ==
Finaldi has curated exhibitions in the UK, Spain, Italy and Belgium and has written catalogues and scholarly articles on Velázquez and Zurbarán, on Italian Baroque painting, on religious iconography, and on Picasso.

Finaldi was a curator at the National Gallery between 1992 and 2002. He was responsible for the later Italian paintings in the collection (Caravaggio to Canaletto) and the Spanish collection (Bermejo to Goya). In 2002 he was appointed deputy director for collections and research at the Museo Nacional del Prado in Madrid, Spain. At the Prado he oversaw the project to build a new extension in 2007, the creation of the Research Centre, and curated major exhibitions on Ribera (in 2011) and Bartolomé Esteban Murillo (in 2012).

On 17 August 2015, Finaldi returned to the National Gallery having been appointed its director.

Finaldi was knighted in the 2025 New Year Honours for services to art and culture.
