= Portrait of Christina of Denmark =

Painting by Hans Holbein the Younger

Christina of Denmark, Duchess of Milan
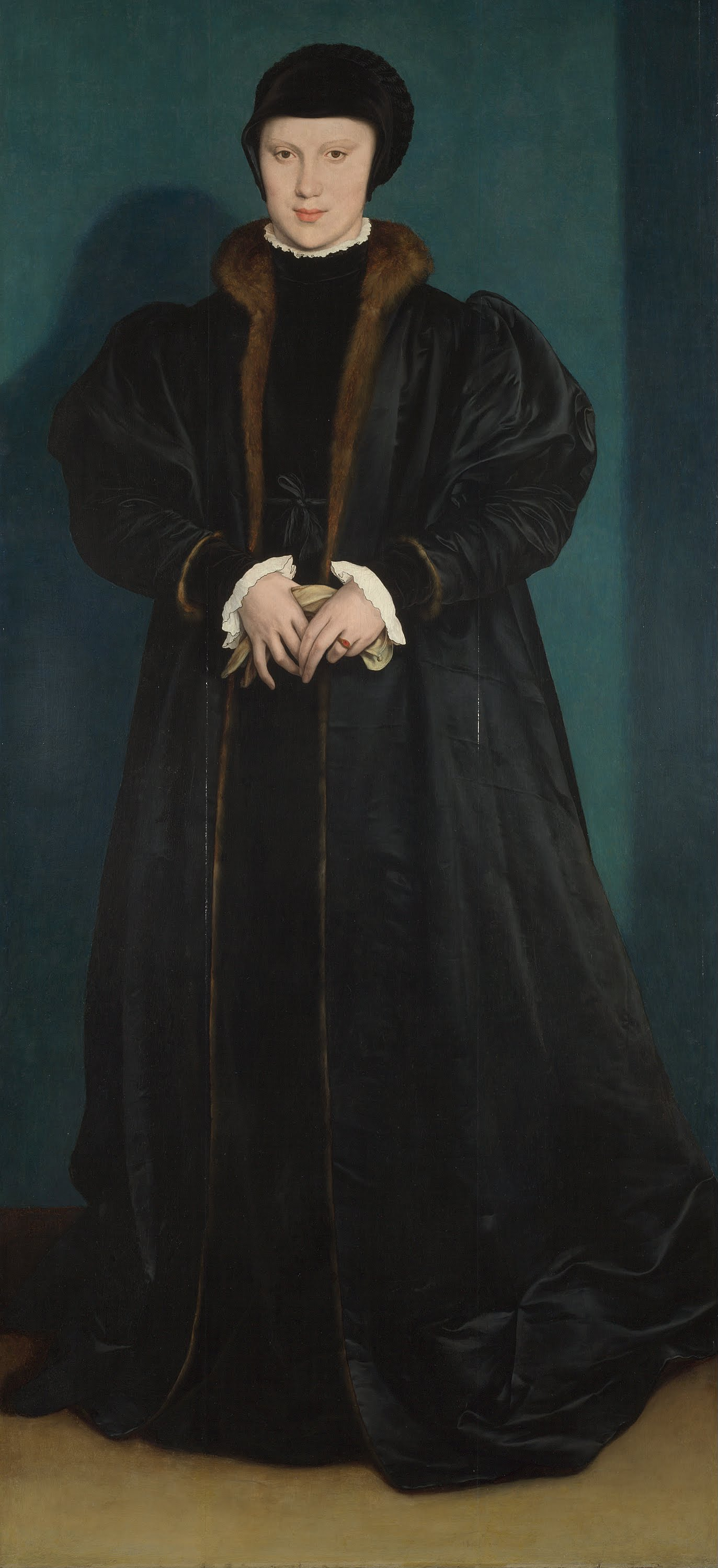
- Artist: Hans Holbein the Younger
- Year: 1538
- Medium: oil on oak
- Dimensions: 179.1 cm × 82.6 cm (70.5 in × 32.5 in)
- Location: National Gallery; London
- Accession: NG2475
- Website: www.nationalgallery.org.uk

Portrait of Christina of Denmark (or Portrait in Mourning) is an oil on oak panel painting by Hans Holbein the Younger completed in 1538. It was commissioned that year by Thomas Cromwell, agent for Henry VIII, as a betrothal painting following the death of the English Queen Jane Seymour. It shows the then sixteen-year-old Christina of Denmark, widow of the Duke of Milan since age 13. Her striking manner and strength of character are apparent in the portrait. Although Henry was taken by the representation, the marriage proposal did not go ahead, not least because Christina was aware of Henry's earlier mistreatment of his wives. She is reported as saying, "If I had two heads, I would happily put one at the disposal of the King of England". Various political and practical obstacles related to her ties with the Lutheran church also thwarted the match.

Art historian Derek Wilson wrote that the portrait "is the loveliest painting of a woman [Holbein] ever painted, that is, it is one of the finest female portraits ever painted."

Despite it not resulting in the marriage he had hoped for, Henry liked the portrait so much that he kept it until he died. It was acquired in 1909 by the National Gallery, London, where it is on permanent display.

== Commission ==
Following the 1537 death of the English Queen Jane Seymour, Holbein was commissioned to paint portraits of noblewomen eligible to marry Henry VIII. Christina was Duchess of Milan, and widowed to Francesco II Sforza, who had died in 1535 when she was just thirteen. Thomas Cromwell sent Holbein and the ambassador Philip Hoby to Brussels to meet with her. He was tasked with providing a straightforward, exact portrait of the girl.

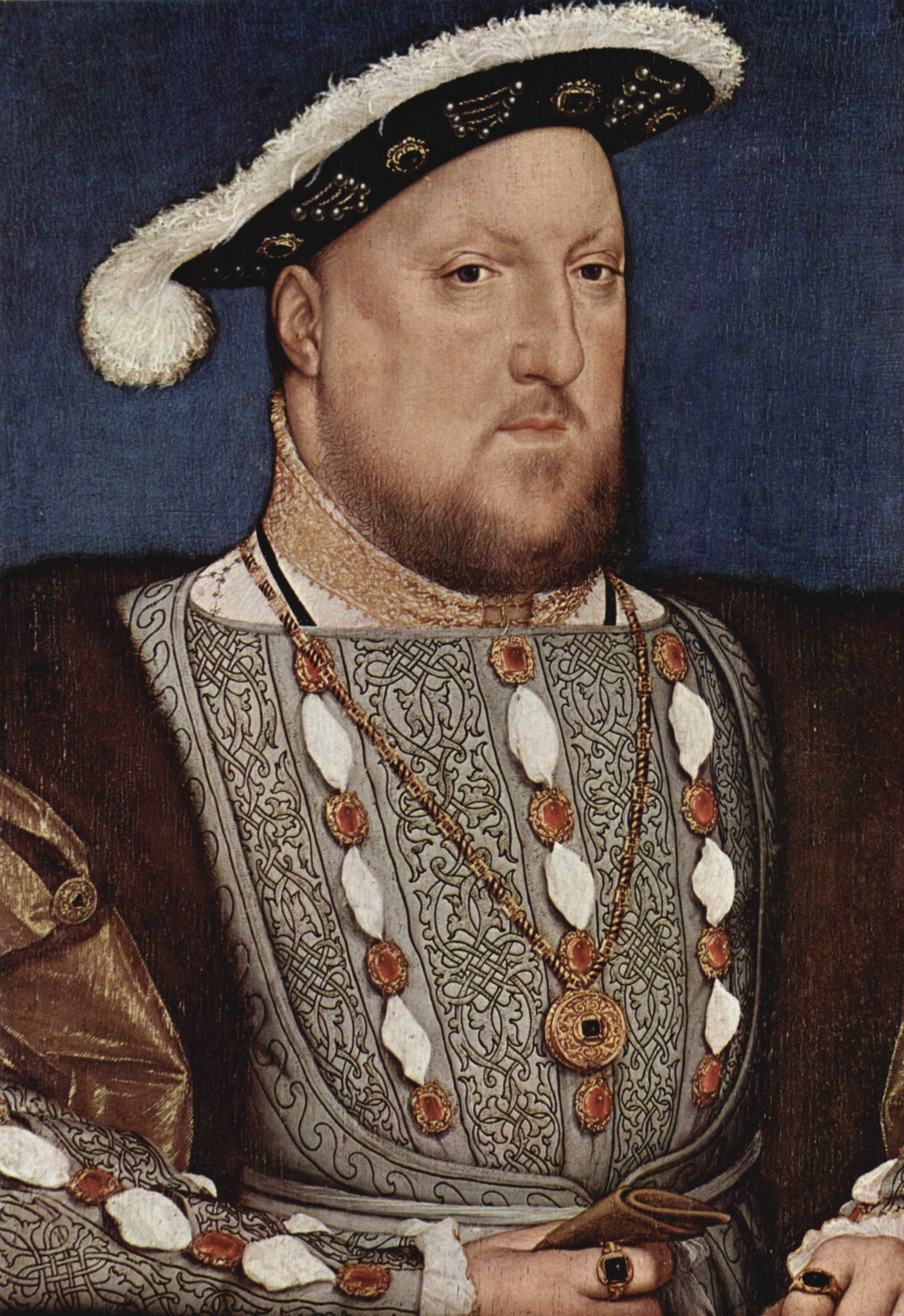
Holbein's Portrait of Henry VIII, c 1537. Thyssen-Bornemisza Museum, Madrid, Spain

They arrived in Denmark on 10 March 1538. On the 12th Christina sat for the portrait for a three hour session between 1:00 and 4:00 pm. Holbein would have been able to speak with her in his native German. That afternoon he made preparatory sketches of her head; the final oil painting was completed at some point shortly after his return to England.

Christina herself was against the marriage arrangement; she was only sixteen years old and made no secret of her distaste for Henry, who by this time had a reputation around Europe for the mistreatment of his wives. She is credited with saying; "If I had two heads, I would happily put one at the disposal of the King of England".

Henry was so taken with the initial colour drawings for the portrait — which showed only her head — that, according to the imperial ambassador Eustace Chapuys, "since he saw it he has been in much better humour than he ever was, making musicians play on their instruments all day long". On the basis of the drawing, he commissioned Holbein to extend it to a full-length oil panel.

John Hutton, the English ambassador in Brussels, reported that another artist's drawing of Christina was "sloberid" (slobbered) compared to Holbein's.

Holbein's portrait appears in an inventory of Henry VIII as a "great table with the Picture of the duches of Mylane being her whole stature".

== Description ==
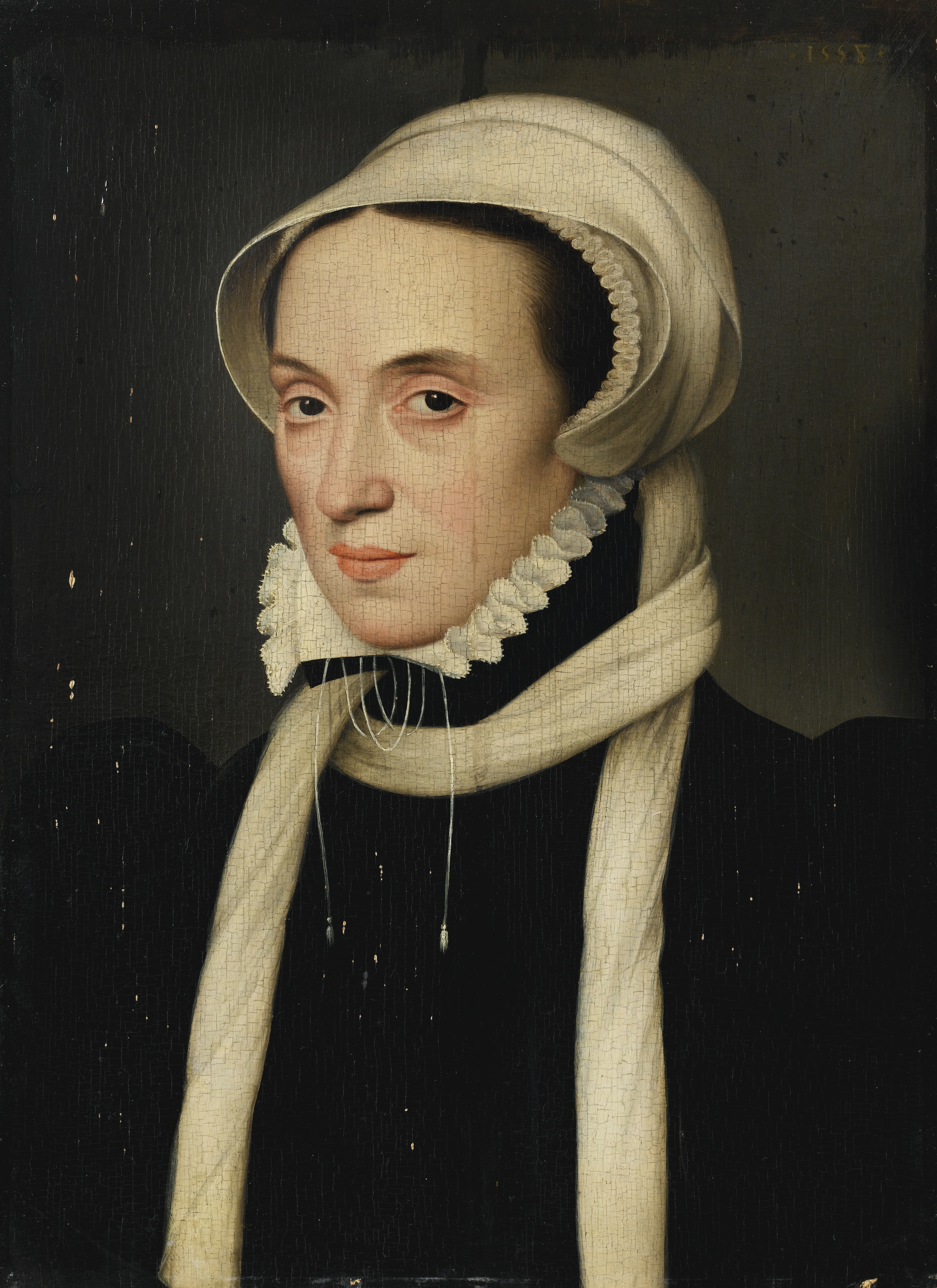
Christina in later life. Portrait by François Clouet, 1558

Christina stands in full length in a frontal pose. She is set against a turquoise background, reminiscent of 15th century Burgundian art. She is dressed in black mourning clothes years after the death of her husband, as was the custom for women in noble Italian marriages. Her black gown is lined with brown fur. She throws a shadow against the wall behind her, a further strip of shadow appears on the right hand side, thrown by an unseen source. Her expression is lively and engaged. She is given bright red lips, whose colour is echoed by the red ring on her fingers. Her youth is conveyed through her half smile, oval face, shy expression and dimples.

Although the portrait is filled with indicators of her nobility, she has taken off her gloves, allowing an informal, intimate atmosphere. She has almost perfect white skin, the tones of which are off-set against her black overcoat.

== See also ==
- List of paintings by Hans Holbein the Younger

== Sources ==
- Auerbach, Erna. Tudor Artists: A Study of Painters in the Royal Service and of Portraiture on Illuminated Documents from the Accession of Henry VIII to the Death of Elizabeth I. London: Athlone Press, 1954. OCLC 1293216 Archived 10 June 2009 at the Wayback Machine
- Bätschmann, Oskar. Hans Holbein. Princeton University Press, 1999. ISBN 978-0-6910-0516-4
- Goldring, Elizabeth. "An Important Early Picture Collection: The Earl of Pembroke's 1561/62 Inventory and the Provenance of Holbein's 'Christina of Denmark'". The Burlington Magazine, volume 144, number. 1188, March 2002. pp. 157-160 JSTOR 889359
- Foister, Susan. "Hans Holbein's Christina of Denmark Archived 14 January 2025 at the Wayback Machine". Video lecture, National Gallery, London, 2018. Retrieved 4 June 2023.
- Rowlands, John. Holbein: The Paintings of Hans Holbein the Younger. Boston: David R. Godine, 1985. ISBN 0-87923-578-0.
- Strong, Roy, "Holbein in England". The Burlington Magazine, Volume 109, No. 770, 1967. JSTOR 875299
- Wilson, Derek. Hans Holbein: Portrait of an Unknown Man. London: Pimlico, 2006. ISBN 978-1-84413-918-7
