= National Gallery =

Art museum in London, England

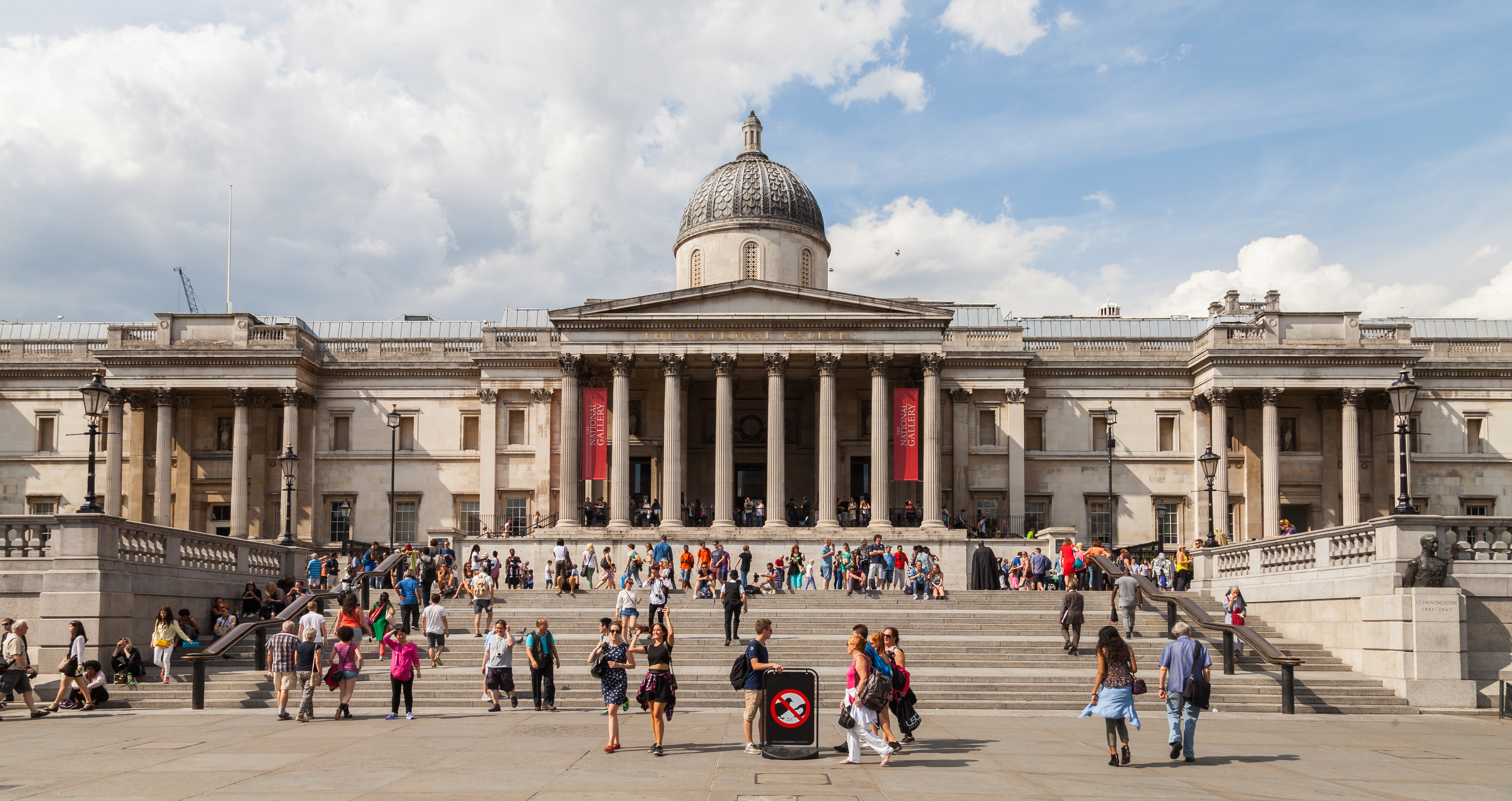
- Trafalgar Square façade

- Location within Central London
- Established: 1824; 202 years ago, current location since 1838
- Location: Trafalgar Square, London, England, United Kingdom
- Coordinates: 51°30′32″N 0°07′42″W
- Type: Art museum
- Visitors: 4,147,544 in 2025
- Director: Gabriele Finaldi
- Public transit access: Charing Cross; Charing Cross; Detailed information below
- Website: www.nationalgallery.org.uk

The National Gallery is an art museum in Trafalgar Square in the City of Westminster, in Central London, England. Founded in 1824, it houses a collection of more than 2,300 paintings dating from the mid-13th century to 1900. (Note: Sculptures and applied art are in the Victoria and Albert Museum, the British Museum houses earlier art, non-Western art, prints and drawings, and art of a later date is at Tate Modern. Some British art is in the National Gallery, but the National Collection of British Art is mainly in Tate Britain.) The current director of the National Gallery is Gabriele Finaldi.

The National Gallery is an exempt charity, and a non-departmental public body of the Department for Culture, Media and Sport. Its collection is held in trust by the charity on behalf of the British public, and entry to the main collection is free of charge.

Unlike comparable museums in continental Europe, the National Gallery was not formed by nationalising an existing royal or princely art collection. It came into being when the British government bought 38 paintings from the heirs of John Julius Angerstein in 1824. After that initial purchase, the gallery was shaped mainly by its early directors, especially Charles Lock Eastlake, and by private donations, which now account for two-thirds of the collection. The collection is smaller than many European national galleries, but encyclopaedic in scope; most major developments in Western painting "from Giotto to Cézanne" are represented with important works. It used to be claimed that this was one of the few national galleries that had all its works on permanent exhibition, but this is no longer the case.

The present building, the third site to house the National Gallery, was designed by William Wilkins. Building began in 1832 and it opened to the public in 1838. Only the façade onto Trafalgar Square remains essentially unchanged from this time, as the building has been expanded piecemeal throughout its history. Wilkins's building was often criticised for the perceived weaknesses of its design and for its lack of space; the latter problem led to the establishment of the Tate Gallery for British art in 1897. The Sainsbury Wing, a 1991 extension to the west by Robert Venturi and Denise Scott Brown, is a significant example of Postmodernist architecture in Britain.

== History ==
=== The call for a National Gallery ===
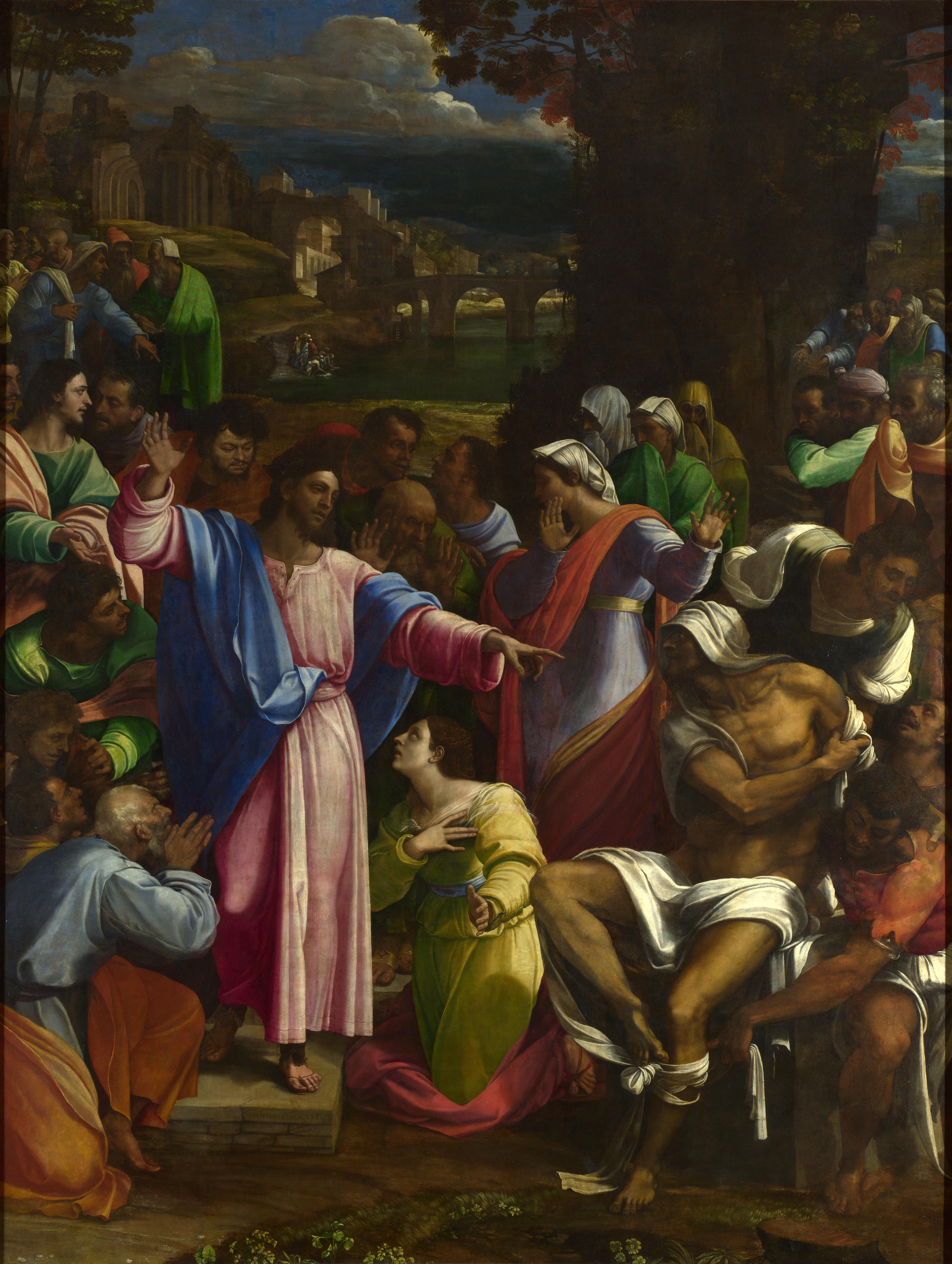
The Raising of Lazarus by Sebastiano del Piombo, from the Angerstein collection. This became the founding collection of the National Gallery in 1824. The painting has the accession number NG1, making it officially the first painting to enter the gallery.

The late 18th century saw the nationalisation of royal or princely art collections across mainland Europe. The Bavarian royal collection (now in the Alte Pinakothek, Munich) opened to the public in 1779, that of the Medici in Florence around 1789 (as the Uffizi Gallery), and the Museum Français at the Louvre was formed out of the former French royal collection in 1793. Great Britain, however, did not follow other European countries, and the British Royal Collection still remains in the sovereign's possession. In 1777, the British government had the opportunity to buy an art collection of international stature, when the descendants of Sir Robert Walpole put his collection up for sale. The MP John Wilkes argued for the government to buy this "invaluable treasure" and suggested that it be housed in "a noble gallery... to be built in the spacious garden of the British Museum". Nothing came of Wilkes's appeal and 20 years later the collection was bought in its entirety by Catherine the Great; it is now to be found in the State Hermitage Museum in Saint Petersburg.

A plan to acquire 150 paintings from the Orléans collection, which had been brought to London for sale in 1798, also failed, despite the interest of both King George III and the Prime Minister, William Pitt the Younger. The twenty-five paintings from that collection now in the gallery, including "NG1", arrived later by a variety of routes. In 1799, the dealer Noël Desenfans offered a ready-made national collection to the British government; he and his partner Sir Francis Bourgeois had assembled it for the king of Poland, before the Third Partition in 1795 abolished Polish independence. This offer was declined and Bourgeois bequeathed the collection to his old school, Dulwich College, on his death. The collection opened in 1814 in Britain's first purpose-built public gallery, the Dulwich Picture Gallery. The Scottish dealer William Buchanan and the collector Joseph Count Truchsess both formed art collections expressly as the basis for a future national collection, but their respective offers (both made in 1803) were also declined.

Following the Walpole sale many artists, including James Barry and John Flaxman, had made renewed calls for the establishment of a National Gallery, arguing that a British school of painting could only flourish if it had access to the canon of European painting. The British Institution, founded in 1805 by a group of aristocratic connoisseurs, attempted to address this situation. The members lent works to exhibitions that changed annually, while an art school was held in the summer months. However, as the paintings that were lent were often mediocre, some artists resented the Institution and saw it as a racket for the gentry to increase the sale prices of their Old Master paintings. One of the Institution's founding members, Sir George Beaumont, 7th Baronet, would eventually play a major role in the National Gallery's foundation by offering a gift of 16 paintings.

In 1823, another major art collection came on the market, which had been assembled by the recently deceased John Julius Angerstein. Angerstein was a Russian-born émigré banker based in London; his collection numbered 38 paintings, including works by Raphael and Hogarth's Marriage A-la-Mode series. On 1 July 1823, George Agar-Ellis, a Whig politician, proposed to the House of Commons that it purchase the collection. The appeal was given added impetus by Beaumont's offer, which came with two conditions: that the government buy the Angerstein collection, and that a suitable building was to be found. The unexpected repayment of a war debt by Austria finally moved the government to buy Angerstein's collection, for £57,000.

=== Foundation and early history ===
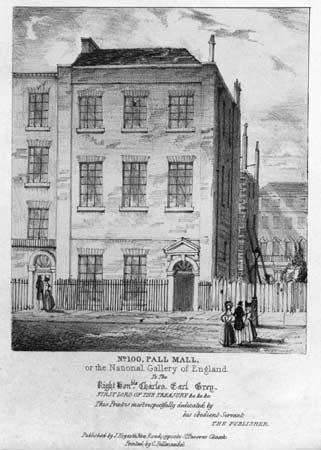
100 Pall Mall, the home of the National Gallery from 1824 to 1834

The National Gallery opened in 1824 in Angerstein's former townhouse at No. 100 Pall Mall. (Note: The opening date is said to have been 10 May 1824, but there is a record of a visit by Agar-Ellis on 5 May during which he met the Keeper, William Seguier, who remarked that opening the gallery to the public free of charge had already proved to be a success, "and that all the people are very orderly and well-behaved". (Smith 2009, p. 27)) Angerstein's paintings were joined in 1826 by those from Beaumont's collection, and in 1831 by the Reverend William Holwell Carr's bequest of 35 paintings. Initially the Keeper of Paintings, William Seguier, bore the burden of managing the gallery, but in July 1824 some of this responsibility fell to the newly formed board of trustees.

The National Gallery at Pall Mall was frequently overcrowded and hot, and its diminutive size in comparison with the Louvre in Paris was a cause of national embarrassment. But Agar-Ellis, by then a trustee of the gallery, appraised the site for being "in the very gangway of London"; this was seen as necessary for the gallery to fulfil its social purpose. Subsidence in No. 100 caused the gallery to move briefly to No. 105 Pall Mall, which the novelist Anthony Trollope described as a "dingy, dull, narrow house, ill-adapted for the exhibition of the treasures it held". This in turn had to be demolished for the opening of a road to Carlton House Terrace.

In 1832, construction began on a new building by William Wilkins on the northern half of the site of the old Royal Mews in Charing Cross, after the transformation of its southern half into Trafalgar Square in the late 1820s. The location was a significant one, between the wealthy West End and poorer areas to the east. The argument that the collection could be accessed by people of all social classes outstripped other concerns, such as the pollution of central London or the failings of Wilkins's building, when the prospect of a move to South Kensington was mooted in the 1850s. According to the Parliamentary Commission of 1857, "The existence of the pictures is not the end purpose of the collection, but the means only to give the people an ennobling enjoyment".

=== Growth under Eastlake and his successors ===
15th- and 16th-century Italian paintings were at the core of the National Gallery and for the first 30 years of its existence the trustees' independent acquisitions were mainly limited to works by High Renaissance masters. Their conservative tastes resulted in several missed opportunities and the management of the gallery later fell into complete disarray, with no acquisitions being made between 1847 and 1850. A critical House of Commons report in 1851 called for the appointment of a director, whose authority would surpass that of the trustees. Many thought the position would go to the German art historian Gustav Friedrich Waagen, whom the gallery had consulted on previous occasions about the lighting and display of the collections. However, the man preferred for the job by Queen Victoria, Prince Albert and the Prime Minister, Lord John Russell, was the Keeper of Paintings at the gallery, Sir Charles Lock Eastlake. Eastlake, who was President of the Royal Academy, played an essential role in the foundation of the Arundel Society and knew most of London's leading art experts.

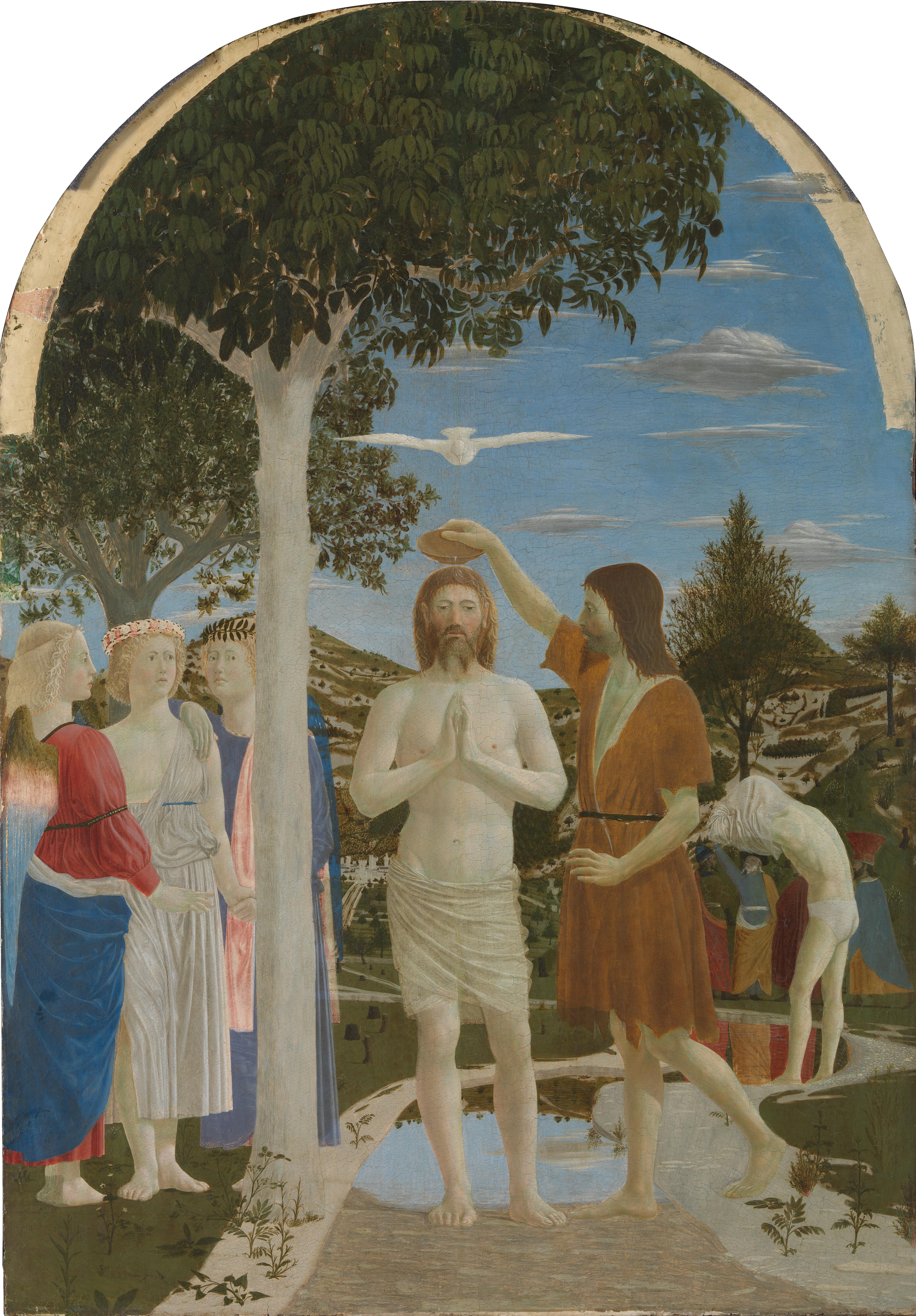
The Baptism of Christ by Piero della Francesca, one of Eastlake's purchases

The new director's taste was for the Northern and Early Italian Renaissance masters or "primitives", who had been neglected by the gallery's acquisitions policy but were slowly gaining recognition from connoisseurs. He made annual tours to the continent and to Italy in particular, seeking out appropriate paintings to buy for the gallery. In all, he bought 148 pictures abroad and 46 in Britain, among the former such seminal works as Paolo Uccello's The Battle of San Romano. Eastlake also amassed a private art collection during this period, consisting of paintings that he knew did not interest the trustees. His ultimate aim, however, was for them to enter the National Gallery; this was duly arranged upon his death by his friend and successor as director, William Boxall, and his widow Lady Elizabeth Eastlake.

One of the most persistent criticisms of the National Gallery, other than of the perceived inadequacies of the building, has been of its conservation policy. The gallery's detractors have accused it of having had an over-zealous approach to restoration. The first cleaning operation at the National Gallery began in 1844 after Eastlake's appointment as Keeper, and was the subject of attacks in the press after the first three paintings to receive the treatment – a Rubens, a Cuyp and a Velázquez – were unveiled to the public in 1846. The gallery's most virulent critic was J. Morris Moore, who wrote a series of letters to The Times under the pseudonym "Verax" savaging the institution's cleanings. While an 1853 Parliamentary select committee set up to investigate the matter cleared the gallery of any wrongdoing, criticism of its methods has been erupting sporadically ever since from some in the art establishment.

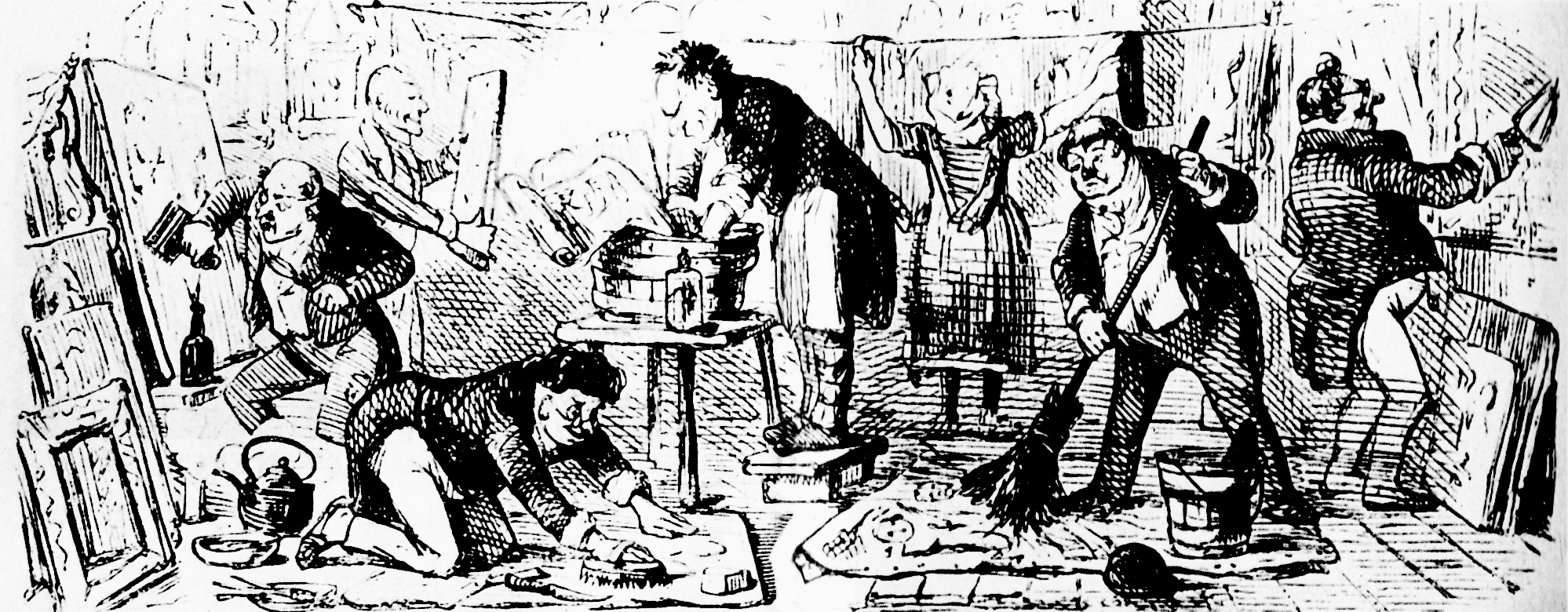
An 1847 Punch cartoon by John Leech depicting the restoration controversy then ongoing

The gallery's lack of space remained acute in this period. In 1845, a large bequest of British paintings was made by Robert Vernon; there was insufficient room in the Wilkins building so they were displayed first in Vernon's town house at No. 50 Pall Mall and then at Marlborough House. The gallery was even less well equipped for its next major bequest, as J. M. W. Turner was to bequeath the entire contents of his studio, excepting unfinished works, to the nation upon his death in 1851. The first 20 of these were displayed off-site in Marlborough House in 1856. Ralph Nicholson Wornum, the gallery's Keeper and Secretary, worked with John Ruskin to bring the bequest together. The stipulation in Turner's will that two of his paintings be displayed alongside works by Claude is still honoured as of 2024, but his bequest has never been adequately displayed in its entirety; today the works are divided between Trafalgar Square and the Clore Gallery, a small purpose-built extension to Tate Britain completed in 1985.

The third director, Sir Frederic William Burton, laid the foundations of the collection of 18th-century art and made several outstanding purchases from English private collections. The acquisition in 1885 of two paintings from Blenheim Palace, Raphael's Ansidei Madonna and van Dyck's Equestrian Portrait of Charles I, with a record-setting grant of £87,500 from the Treasury, brought the gallery's "golden age of collecting" to an end, as its annual purchase grant was suspended for several years thereafter. When the gallery purchased Holbein's Ambassadors from the Earl of Radnor in 1890, it did so with the aid of private individuals for the first time in its history. In 1897, the formation of the National Gallery of British Art, known unofficially from early in its history as the Tate Gallery, allowed some British works to be moved off-site, following the precedent set by the Vernon collection and the Turner Bequest. Works by artists born after 1790 were moved to the new gallery on Millbank, which allowed Hogarth, Turner and Constable to remain in Trafalgar Square.

=== Early 20th century ===
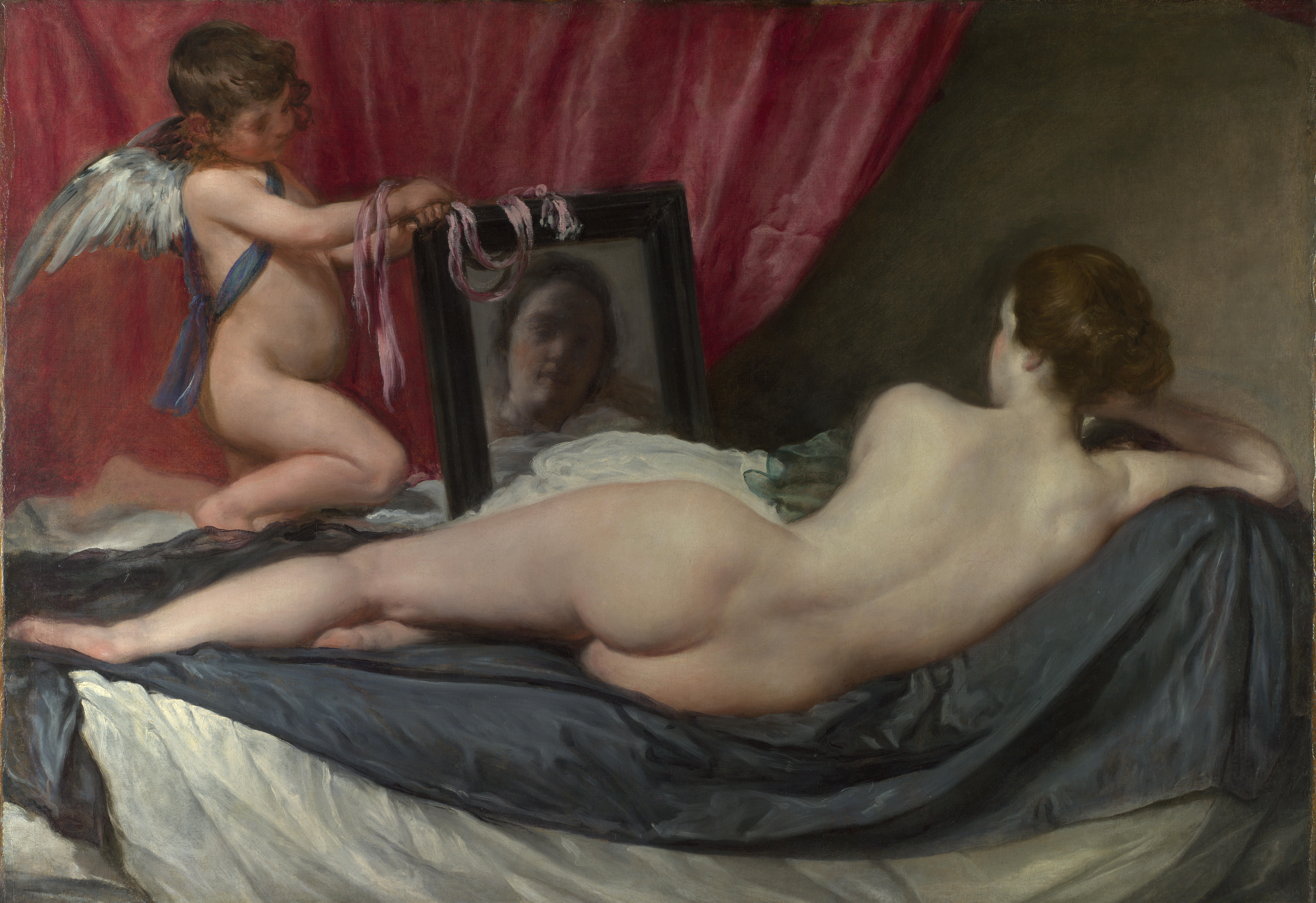
Venus at her Mirror (The Rokeby Venus) by Diego Velázquez

The Great depression of British agriculture at the turn of the 20th century caused many aristocratic families to sell their paintings, but the British national collections were priced out of the market by American plutocrats. This prompted the foundation of the National Art-Collections Fund, a society of subscribers dedicated to stemming the flow of artworks to the United States. Their first acquisition for the National Gallery was Velázquez's Rokeby Venus in 1906, followed by Holbein's Portrait of Christina of Denmark in 1909. However, despite the crisis in aristocratic fortunes, the following decade was one of several great bequests from private collectors. In 1909, the industrialist Ludwig Mond gave 42 Italian Renaissance paintings, including the Mond Crucifixion by Raphael, to the gallery. Other bequests of note were those of George Salting in 1910, Austen Henry Layard in 1916 and Sir Hugh Lane in 1917.

The initial reception of Impressionist art at the gallery was exceptionally controversial. In 1906, Sir Hugh Lane promised 39 paintings, including Renoir's Umbrellas, to the National Gallery on his death, unless a suitable building could be built in Dublin. Although eagerly accepted by the director Charles Holroyd, they were received with extreme hostility by the trustees; Lord Redesdale wrote that "I would as soon expect to hear of a Mormon service being conducted in St. Paul's Cathedral as to see the exhibition of the works of the modern French Art-rebels in the sacred precincts of Trafalgar Square". Perhaps as a result of such attitudes, Lane amended his will with a codicil that the works should only go to Ireland, but crucially this was never witnessed. Lane died on board the RMS Lusitania in 1915, and a dispute began which was not resolved until 1959. Part of the collection is now on permanent loan to the Hugh Lane Gallery and other works rotate between London and Dublin every few years.

A fund for the purchase of modern paintings established by Samuel Courtauld in 1923 bought Seurat's Bathers at Asnières and other modern works for the nation; in 1934, many of these were transferred to the National Gallery from the Tate.

The director Kenneth Clark's decision in 1939 to label a group of Venetian paintings, Scenes from Tebaldeo's Eclogues, as works by Giorgione was controversial at the time, and the panels were soon identified as works by Andrea Previtali by a junior curator Clark had appointed.

=== Second World War ===
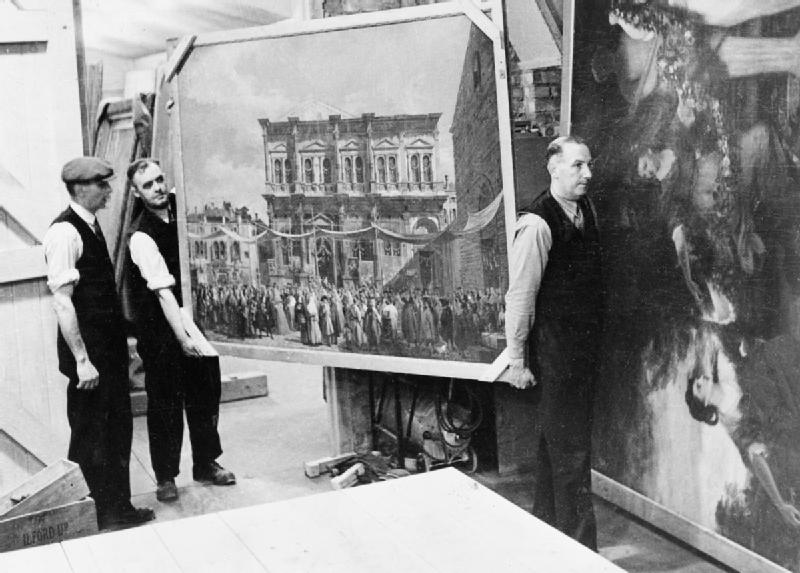
Paintings being evacuated from the National Gallery during the Second World War

Shortly before the outbreak of the Second World War the paintings were evacuated to locations in Wales, including Penrhyn Castle and the university colleges of Bangor and Aberystwyth. In 1940, during the Battle of France, a more secure home was sought, and there were discussions about moving the paintings to Canada. This idea was firmly rejected by Winston Churchill, who wrote in a telegram to Kenneth Clark, "bury them in caves or in cellars, but not a picture shall leave these islands". Instead a slate quarry at Manod, near Blaenau Ffestiniog in North Wales, was requisitioned for the gallery's use. In the seclusion afforded by the paintings' new location, the Keeper (and future director) Martin Davies began to compile scholarly catalogues on the collection, with assistance of the gallery's library which was also stored in the quarry. The move to Manod confirmed the importance of storing paintings at a constant temperature and humidity, something the gallery's conservators had long suspected but had hitherto been unable to prove. This eventually resulted in the first air-conditioned gallery opening in 1949.

For the course of the war Myra Hess and other musicians, such as Moura Lympany, gave daily lunch-time recitals in the empty building in Trafalgar Square, to raise public morale as every concert hall in London was closed. Art exhibitions were held at the gallery as a complement to the recitals. The first of these was British Painting since Whistler in 1940, organised by Lillian Browse, who also mounted the major joint retrospective Exhibition of Paintings by Sir William Nicholson and Jack B. Yeats held from 1 January to 15 March 1942, which was seen by 10,518 visitors. Exhibitions of work by war artists, including Paul Nash, Henry Moore and Stanley Spencer, were also held; the War Artists' Advisory Committee had been set up by Clark in order "to keep artists at work on any pretext". In 1941, a request from an artist to see Rembrandt's Portrait of Margaretha de Geer (a new acquisition) resulted in the "Picture of the Month" scheme, in which a single painting was removed from Manod and exhibited to the general public in the National Gallery each month. The art critic Herbert Read, writing that year, called the National Gallery "a defiant outpost of culture right in the middle of a bombed and shattered metropolis". The paintings returned to Trafalgar Square in 1945.

=== Post-war developments ===
The last major outcry against the use of radical conservation techniques at the National Gallery was in the immediate post-war years, following a restoration campaign by the gallery's chief restorer Helmut Ruhemann while the paintings were in Manod Quarry. When the cleaned pictures were exhibited to the public in 1946 there followed a furore with parallels to that of a century earlier. The principal criticism was that the extensive removal of varnish, which was used in the 19th century to protect the surface of paintings but which darkened and discoloured over time, may have resulted in the loss of "harmonising" glazes added to the paintings by the artists themselves. The opposition to Ruhemann's techniques was led by Ernst Gombrich, a professor at the Warburg Institute who in later correspondence with a restorer described being treated with "offensive superciliousness" by the National Gallery. A 1947 commission concluded that no damage had been done in the recent cleanings.

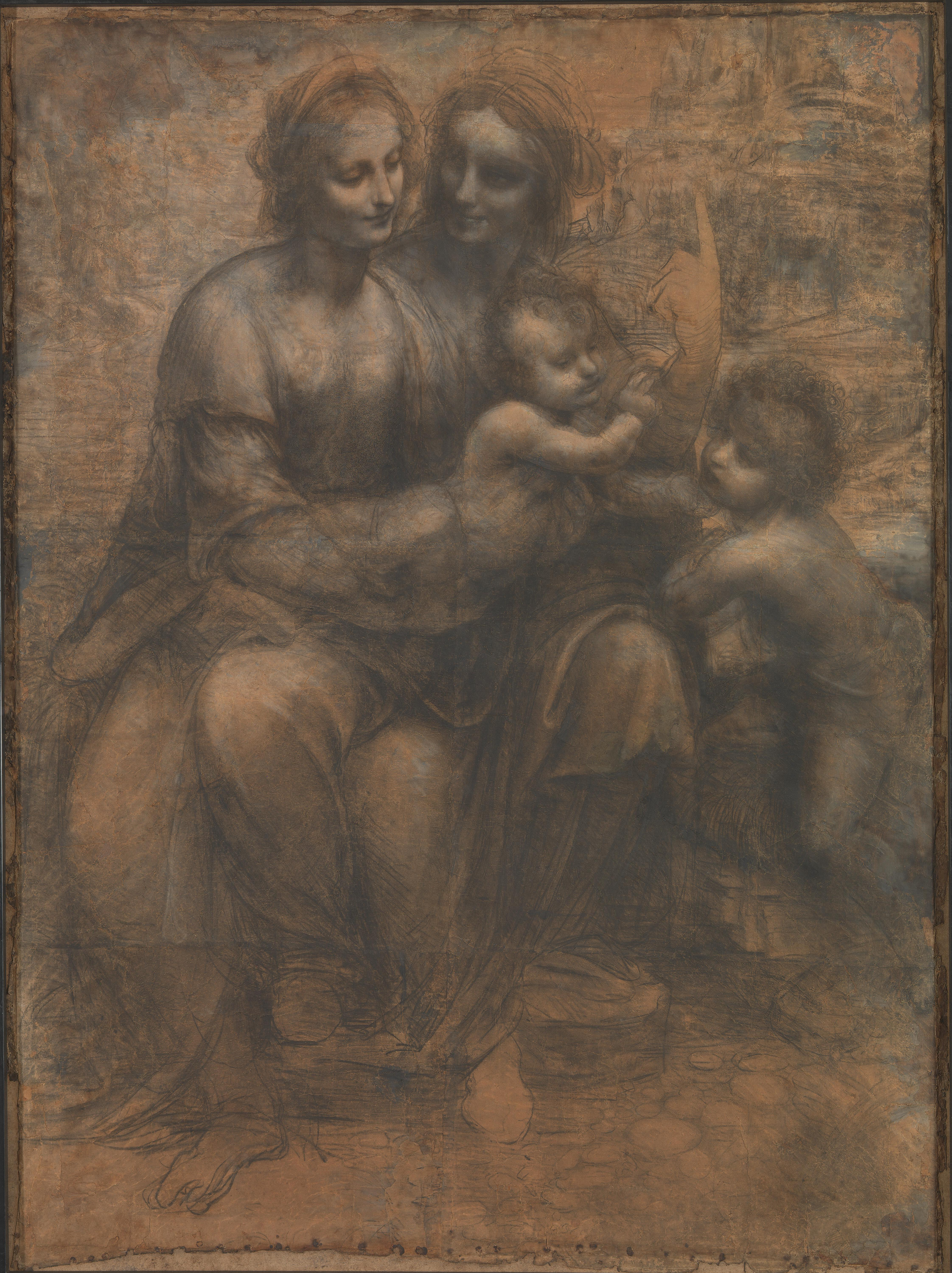
The Virgin and Child with Saint Anne and Saint John the Baptist by Leonardo da Vinci

In the post-war years, acquisitions have become increasingly difficult for the National Gallery as the prices for Old Masters – and even more so for the Impressionists and Post-Impressionists – have risen beyond its means. Some of the gallery's most significant purchases in this period would have been impossible without the major public appeals backing them, including Leonardo da Vinci's cartoon of The Virgin and Child with Saint Anne and Saint John the Baptist (bought in 1962) and Titian's Death of Actaeon (bought in 1972). The gallery's purchase grant from the government was frozen in 1985, but later that year it received an endowment of £50 million from Sir Paul Getty, enabling many major purchases to be made. In April 1985 Lord Sainsbury of Preston Candover and his brothers, Simon Sainsbury and Sir Timothy Sainsbury, had made a donation that would enable the construction of the Sainsbury Wing.

The directorship of Neil MacGregor saw a major rehang at the gallery, dispensing with the classification of paintings by national school that had been introduced by Eastlake. The new chronological hang sought to emphasise the interaction between cultures rather than fixed national characteristics, reflecting the change in art-historical values since the 19th century. In other respects, however, Victorian tastes were rehabilitated: the building's interiors were no longer considered an embarrassment and were restored, and in 1999 the gallery accepted a bequest of 26 Italian Baroque paintings from Sir Denis Mahon. Earlier in the 20th century many considered the Baroque to be beyond the pale: in 1945 the gallery's trustees declined to buy a Guercino from Mahon's collection for £200. The same painting was valued at £4 million in 2003. Mahon's bequest was made on the condition that the gallery would never deaccession any of its paintings or charge for admission.

The respective remits of the National and Tate Galleries, which had long been contested by the two institutions, were more clearly defined in 1996. 1900 was established as the cut-off point for paintings in the National Gallery, and in 1997 more than 60 post-1900 paintings from the collection were given to the Tate on a long-term loan, in return for works by Gauguin and others. However, future expansion of the National Gallery may yet see the return of 20th-century paintings to its walls.

=== 21st century ===
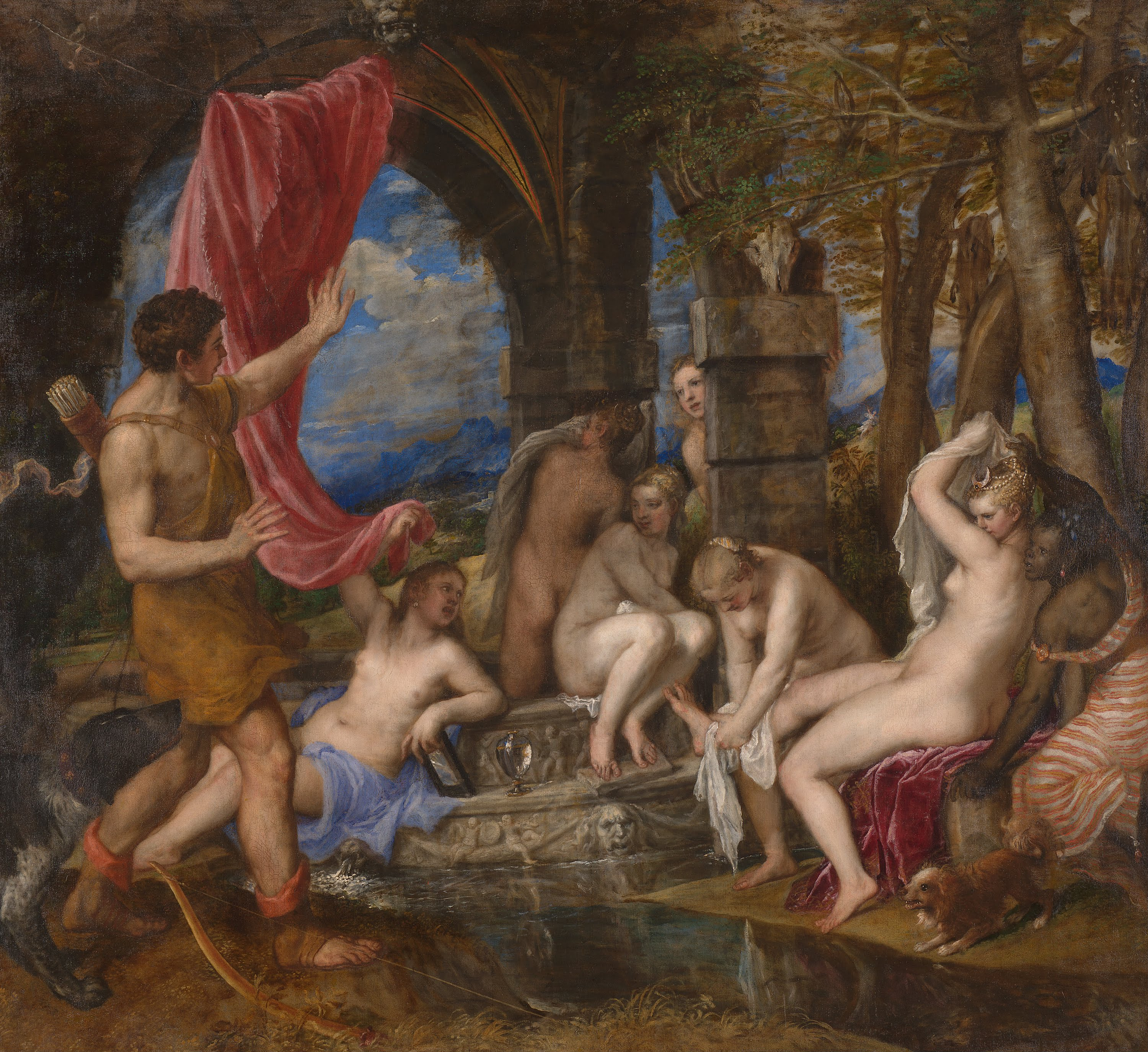
Titian's Diana and Actaeon, bought in 2008, jointly with the National Gallery of Scotland

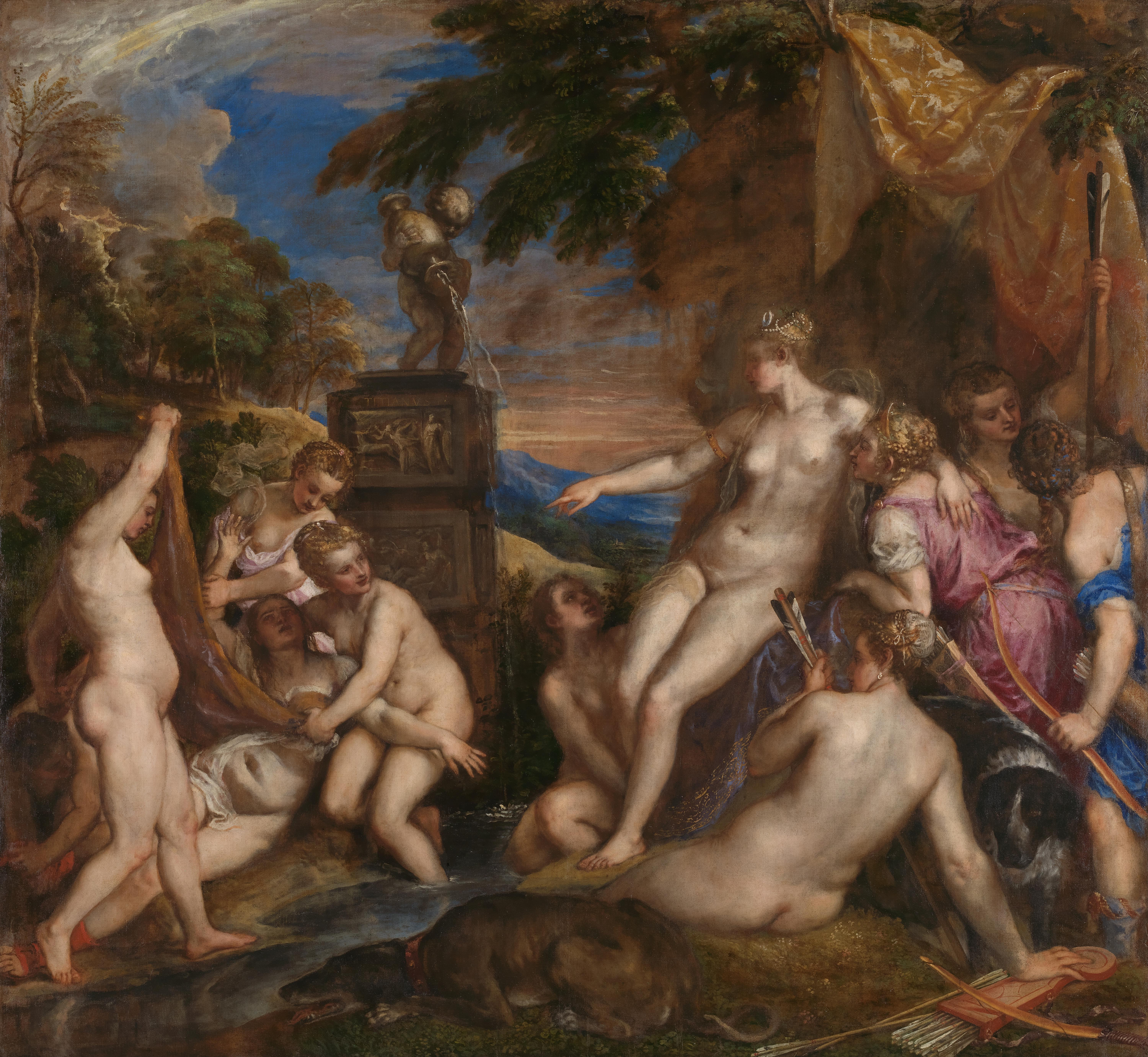
Titian's Diana and Callisto, bought in 2012, jointly with the National Gallery of Scotland

In the 21st century there have been three large fundraising campaigns at the gallery: in 2004, to buy Raphael's Madonna of the Pinks; in 2008, for Titian's Diana and Actaeon; and in 2012, Titian's Diana and Callisto. Both Titians were bought in tandem with the National Gallery of Scotland for £95 m. Both of these major works were sold from the collection of the Duke of Sutherland. The National Gallery is now largely priced out of the market for Old Master paintings and can only make such acquisitions with the backing of major public appeals; the departing director Charles Saumarez Smith expressed his frustration at this situation in 2007.

The National Gallery was sponsored by the Italian arms manufacturer Finmeccanica between October 2011 and October 2012. The sponsorship deal allowed the company to use gallery spaces for gatherings, and the gallery was used to host delegates during the DSEI arms fair and the Farnborough Airshow. The sponsorship deal was ended a year early after protests.

In February 2014, the gallery purchased Men of the Docks by the American artist George Bellows for $25.5 million (£15.6 million). It was the first major American painting to be purchased by the gallery. The director, Nicholas Penny, termed the painting a new direction for the gallery, a non-European painting in a European style. Its sale was controversial in the United States.

In 2018, the National Gallery was one of the first public galleries in London to charge more than £20 for admission to a special exhibition, the exhibition in question being of works by Claude Monet.

In February 2019, an employment tribunal ruled that the gallery had incorrectly classed its team of educators as self-employed contractors. The educators were awarded the status of "workers" following legal action brought by 27 claimants. The case received considerable press and media coverage.

In 2024, the National Gallery celebrated its 200th anniversary with a range of programmes, events, and collaborations.

In September 2025, the National Gallery announced plans for a £375 million expansion project, provisionally titled 'Project Domani'. The initiative includes the construction of a new wing behind the existing Sainsbury Wing and a policy change allowing the acquisition of works created after 1900. The expansion is scheduled to open in the early 2030s. Project Domani was launched with the aid of a £150 million donation from Crankstart, a San Francisco-based foundation, with a further £150 million coming from the Julia Rausing Trust. On 7 April 2026 (subject to ratification at the end of a standstill period ending 16 April), the National Gallery announced that Kengo Kuma and Associates with BDP and MICA won the competition to design the new wing.

In November 2026, a ten-year plan entitled "Home to the Story of Painting" was published. It was roundly condemned by art critics at the Daily Telegraph, and The Spectator.

== Architecture ==
=== William Wilkins's building ===
National Gallery
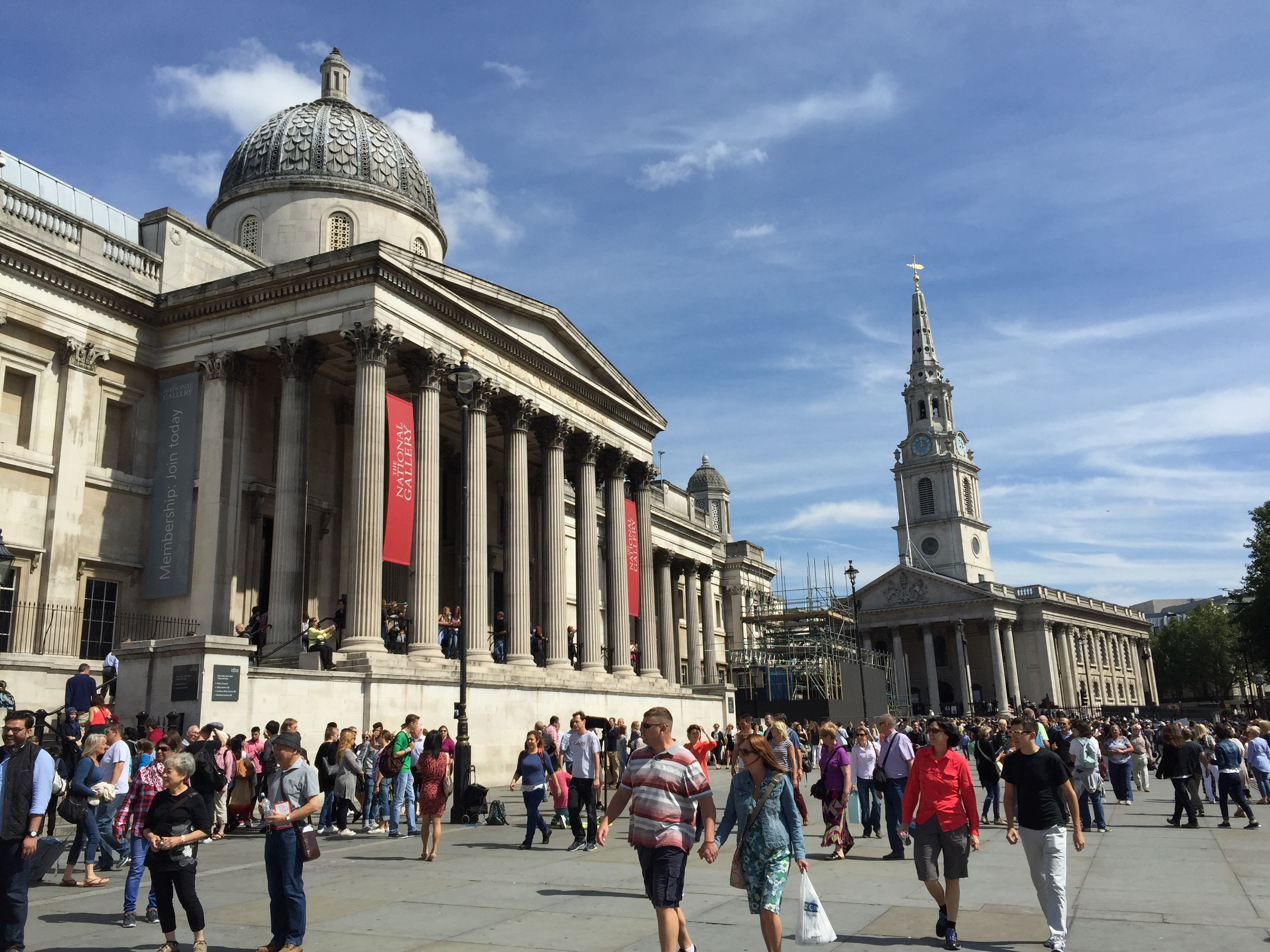
- The Wilkins Building, with the church of St Martin-in-the-Fields to the right
- Interactive map of National Gallery

History
- Built: 1832–1838

Site notes
- Architect: William Wilkins
- Architectural style: Neoclassical

Listed Building – Grade I
- Official name: National Gallery
- Designated: 5 February 1970
- Reference no.: 1066236

The first suggestion for a National Gallery on Trafalgar Square came from John Nash, who envisaged it on the site of the King's Mews, while a Parthenon-like building for the Royal Academy would occupy the centre of the square. Economic recession prevented this scheme from being built, but a competition for the Mews site was eventually held in 1831, for which Nash submitted a design with Charles Robert Cockerell as his co-architect. Nash's popularity was waning by this time, however, and the commission was awarded to William Wilkins, who was involved in the selection of the site and submitted some drawings at the last moment. Wilkins had hoped to build a "Temple of the Arts, nurturing contemporary art through historical example", but the commission was blighted by parsimony and compromise, and the resulting building, which opened to the public on 9 April 1838, was deemed a failure on almost all counts.

The site only allowed for the building to be one room deep, as a workhouse and a barracks lay immediately behind. (Note: St Martin's Workhouse (to the east) was cleared for the construction of E. M. Barry's extension, whereas St George's Barracks stayed until 1911, supposedly because of the need for troops to be at hand to quell disturbances in Trafalgar Square. (Conlin 2006, p. 401) Wilkins had hoped for more land to the south, but was denied it as building there would have obscured the view of St Martin-in-the-Fields.) To exacerbate matters, there was a public right of way through the site to these buildings, which accounts for the access porticoes on the eastern and western sides of the façade. These had to incorporate columns from the demolished Carlton House, and their relative shortness resulted in an elevation that was deemed excessively low, thus failing to provide Trafalgar Square with its desired commanding focal point to the north. Also recycled are the sculptures on the façade, originally intended for Nash's Marble Arch but abandoned due to his financial problems. (Note: They are as follows: above the main entrance, a blank roundel (originally to feature the Duke of Wellington's face) flanked by two female figures (personifications of Europe and Asia/India, sites of his campaigns) and high up on the eastern façade, Minerva by John Flaxman, originally Britannia.) The eastern half of the building housed the Royal Academy until 1868, which further diminished the space afforded to the National Gallery.

The building was the object of public ridicule before it had even been completed, as a version of the design had been leaked to The Literary Gazette in 1833. Two years before completion, its infamous "pepperpot" elevation appeared on the frontispiece of Contrasts (1836), an influential tract by the Gothicist Augustus Pugin, as an example of the degeneracy of the classical style. Even William IV (in his last recorded utterance) thought the building a "nasty little pokey hole", while William Makepeace Thackeray called it "a little gin shop of a building". The twentieth-century architectural historian Sir John Summerson echoed these early criticisms when he compared the arrangement of a dome and two diminutive turrets on the roofline to "the clock and vases on a mantelpiece, only less useful". (Note: Summerson's "mantelpiece" comparison inspired the title of Conlin's 2006 history of the National Gallery, The Nation's Mantelpiece (op. cit.).) Sir Charles Barry's landscaping of Trafalgar Square, from 1840, included a north terrace so that the building would appear to be raised, thus addressing one of the points of complaint. Opinion on the building had mellowed considerably by 1984, when Prince Charles called the Wilkins façade a "much-loved and elegant friend", in contrast to a proposed extension. (See below)

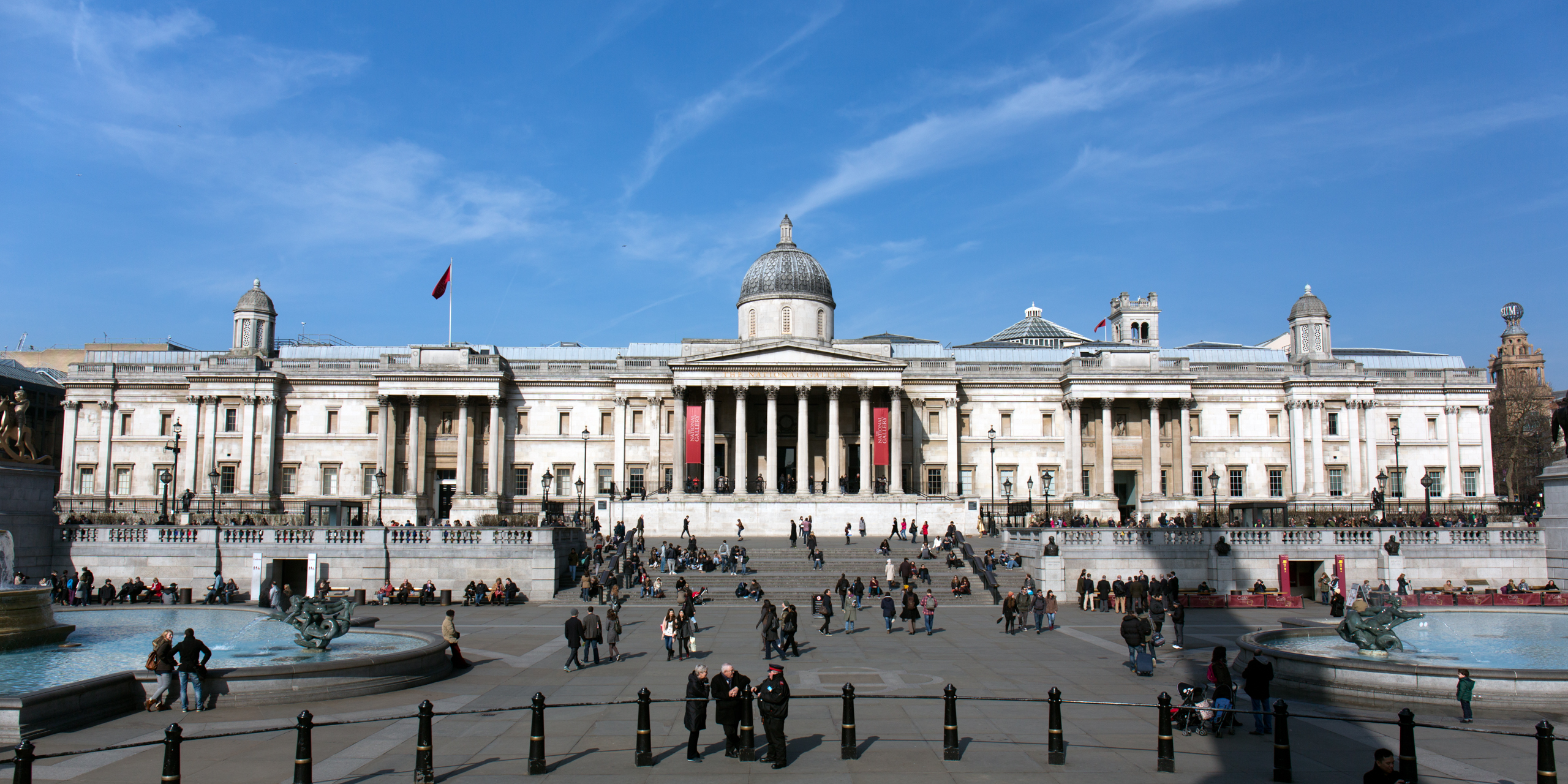
The elevation onto Trafalgar Square in 2013

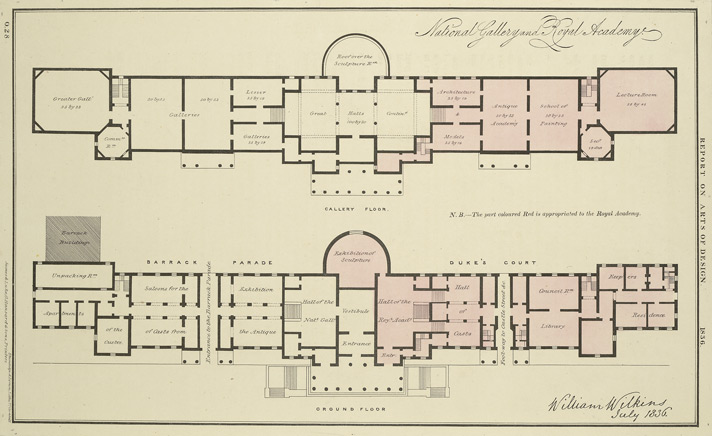
The piano nobile and ground floor of Wilkins's building, before expansion. Note the passageways behind the east and west porticoes. Areas shaded in pink were used by the Royal Academy until 1868.

Plan of the first floor of the National Gallery in 2013

=== Alteration and expansion (Pennethorne, Barry and Taylor) ===
The first significant alteration made to the building was the single, long gallery added by Sir James Pennethorne in 1860–1861. Ornately decorated in comparison with the rooms by Wilkins, it nonetheless worsened the cramped conditions inside the building as it was built over the original entrance hall. Unsurprisingly, several attempts were made either to completely remodel the National Gallery (as suggested by Sir Charles Barry in 1853), or to move it to more capacious premises in Kensington, where the air was also cleaner. In 1867 Barry's son Edward Middleton Barry proposed to replace the Wilkins building with a massive classical building with four domes. The scheme was a failure and contemporary critics denounced the exterior as "a strong plagiarism upon St Paul's Cathedral".

With the demolition of the workhouse, however, Barry was able to build the gallery's first sequence of grand architectural spaces, from 1872 to 1876. Built to a polychrome Neo-Renaissance design, the Barry Rooms were arranged on a Greek cross plan around a huge central octagon. Though it compensated for the underwhelming architecture of the Wilkins building, Barry's new wing was disliked by Gallery staff, who considered its monumental aspect to be in conflict with its function as exhibition space. Also, the decorative programme of the rooms did not take their intended contents into account; the ceiling of the 15th- and 16th-century Italian gallery, for instance, was inscribed with the names of British artists of the 19th century. However, despite these failures, the Barry Rooms provided the gallery with a strong axial groundplan; this was to be followed by all subsequent additions to the gallery for a century, resulting in a building of clear symmetry.

Pennethorne's gallery was demolished for the next phase of building, a scheme by Sir John Taylor extending northwards of the main entrance. Its glass-domed entrance vestibule had painted ceiling decorations by the Crace family firm, who had also worked on the Barry Rooms. A fresco intended for the south wall was never realised.

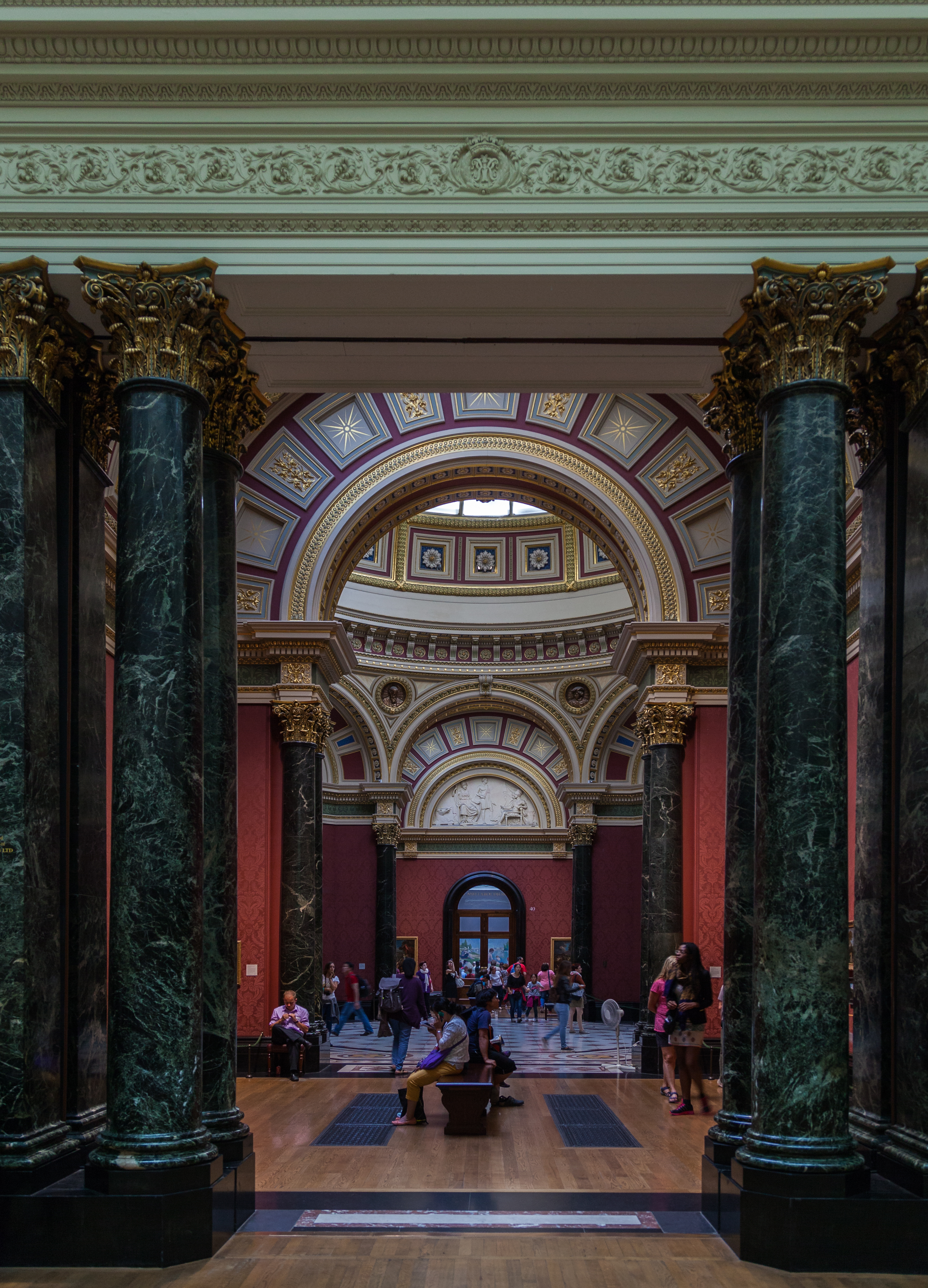
The Barry Rooms (1872–1876), designed by E. M. Barry

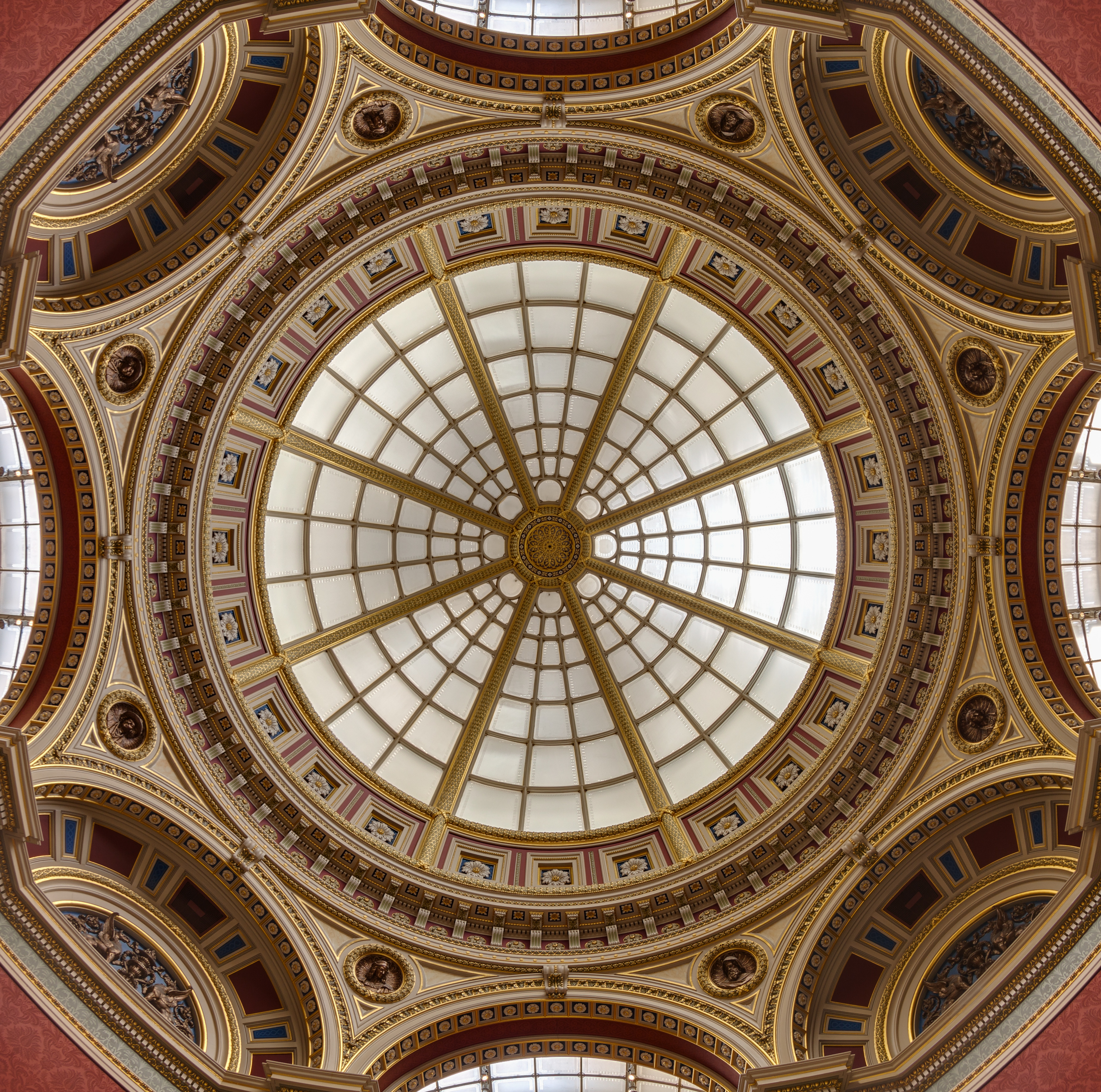
The dome of Room 34, the central octagon of the Barry Rooms

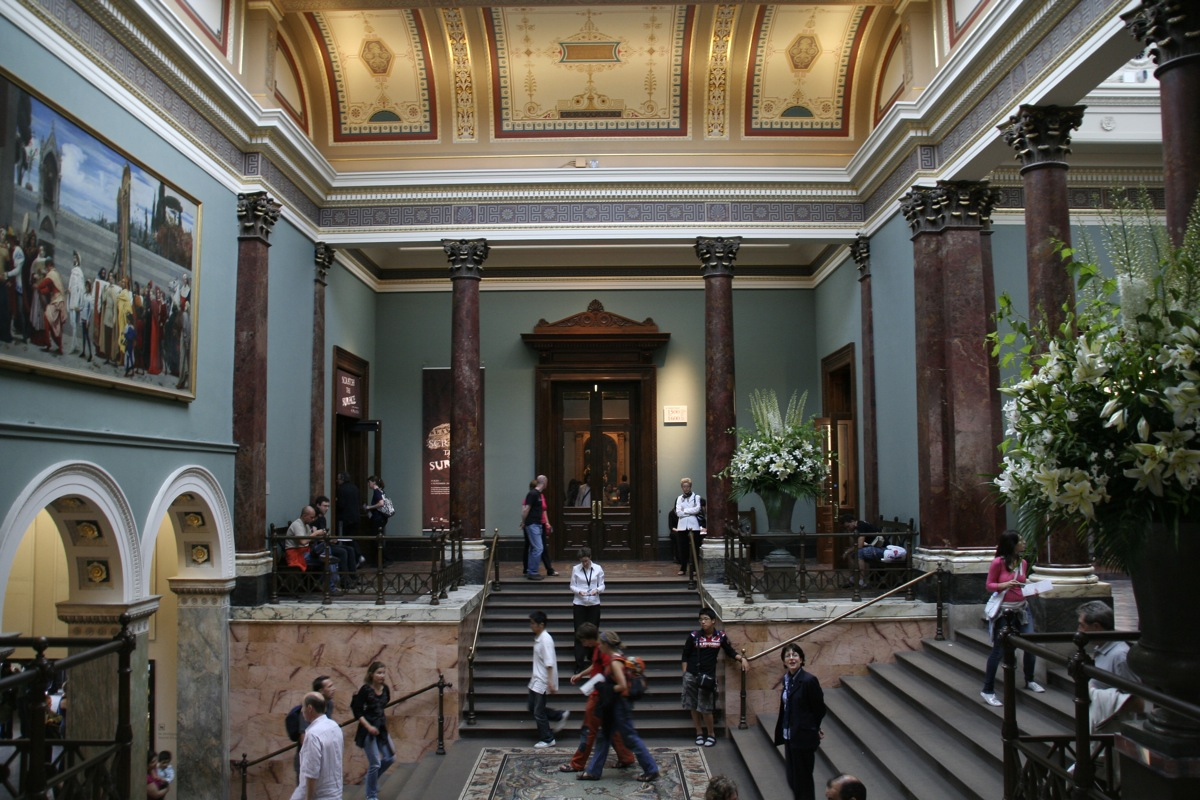
The Staircase Hall (1884–1887), designed by Sir John Taylor, in a photograph of 2007. To the left is Cimabue's Celebrated Madonna by Frederic, Lord Leighton (a loan from the Royal Collection since the 1990s).

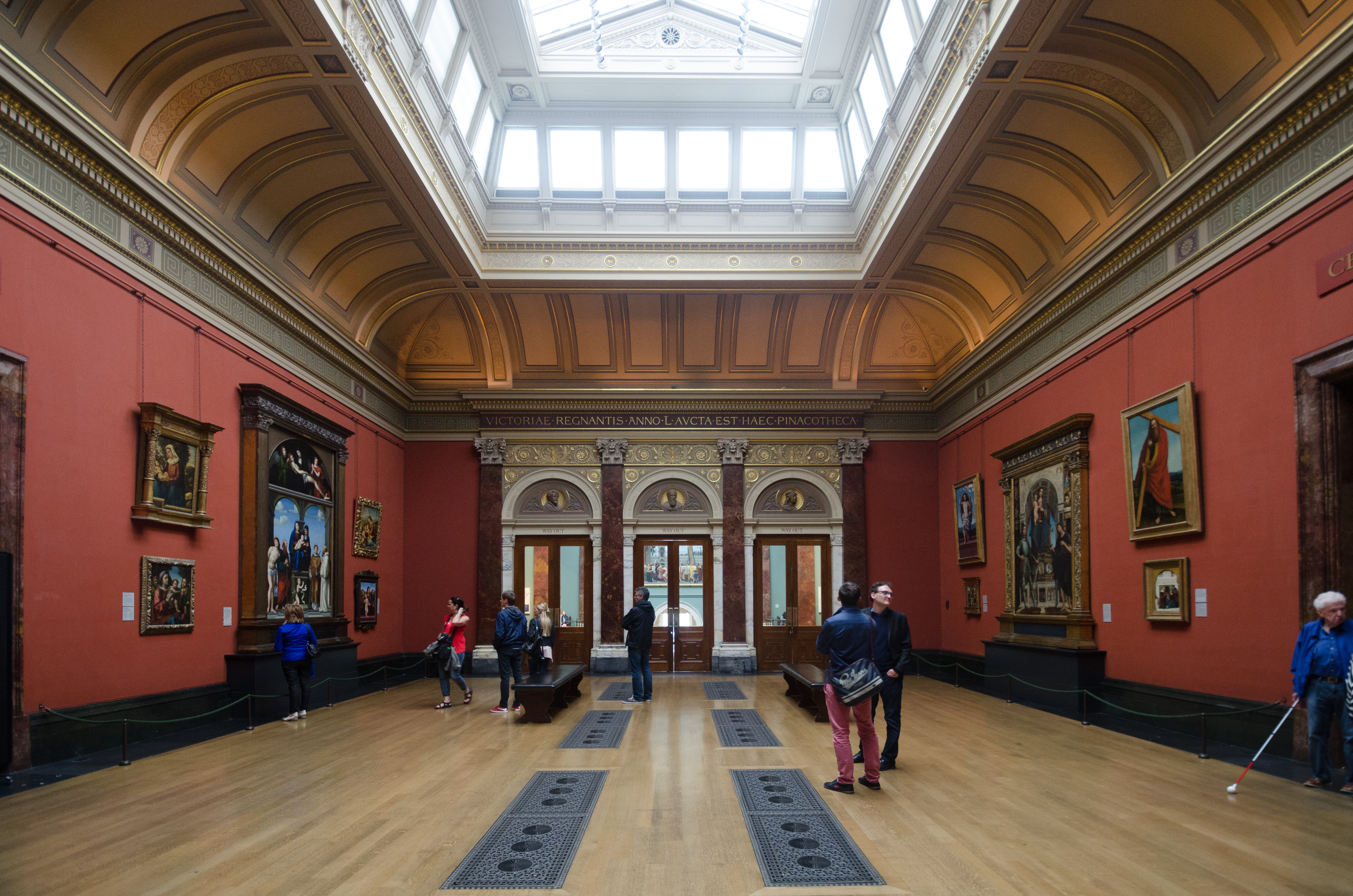
The Central Hall, part of Sir John Taylor's additions

=== 20th century: modernisation versus restoration ===
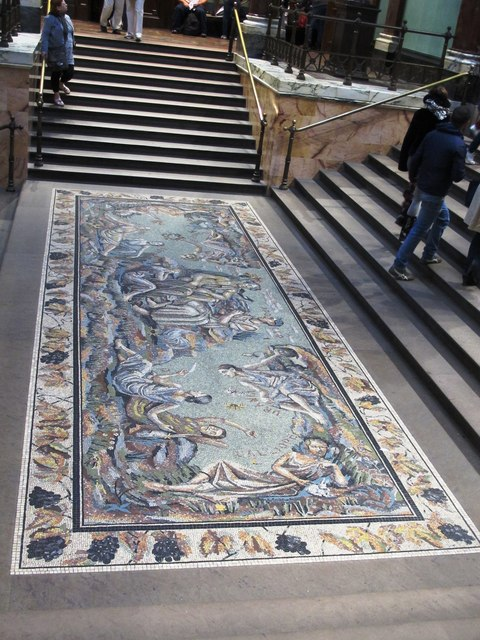
The Awakening of the Muses (1933), a mosaic by Boris Anrep

Later additions to the west came more steadily but maintained the coherence of the building by mirroring Barry's cross-axis plan to the east. The use of dark marble for doorcases was also continued, giving the extensions a degree of internal consistency with the older rooms. The classical style was still in use at the National Gallery in 1929, when a Beaux-Arts–style gallery was built, funded by the art dealer and trustee Lord Duveen. However, it was not long before the 20th-century reaction against Victorian attitudes became manifest at the gallery. From 1928 to 1952, the landing floors of Taylor's entrance hall were relaid with a new series of mosaics by Boris Anrep, who was friendly with the Bloomsbury Group. These mosaics can be read as a satire on 19th-century conventions for the decoration of public buildings, as typified by the Albert Memorial's Frieze of Parnassus. The central mosaic depicting The Awakening of the Muses includes portraits of Virginia Woolf and Greta Garbo, subverting the high moral tone of its Victorian forebears. In place of Christianity's seven virtues, Anrep offered his own set of Modern Virtues, including "Humour" and "Open Mind"; the allegorical figures are again portraits of his contemporaries, including Winston Churchill, Bertrand Russell and T. S. Eliot.

In the 20th century, the gallery's late Victorian interiors fell out of fashion. The Crace ceiling decorations in the entrance hall were not to the taste of the director Charles Holmes, and were obliterated by white paint. The North Galleries, which opened to the public in 1975, marked the arrival of modernist architecture at the National Gallery. In the older rooms, the original classical details were effaced by partitions, daises and suspended ceilings, the aim being to create neutral settings which did not distract from contemplation of the paintings. But the gallery's commitment to modernism was short-lived: by the 1980s Victorian style was no longer considered anathema, and a restoration programme began to restore the 19th- and early 20th-century interiors to their purported original appearance. This began with the refurbishment of the Barry Rooms in 1985–1986. From 1996 to 1999 even the North Galleries, by then considered to "lack a positive architectural character", were remodelled in a classical style, albeit a simplified one.

=== Sainsbury Wing and later additions ===
Sainsbury Wing
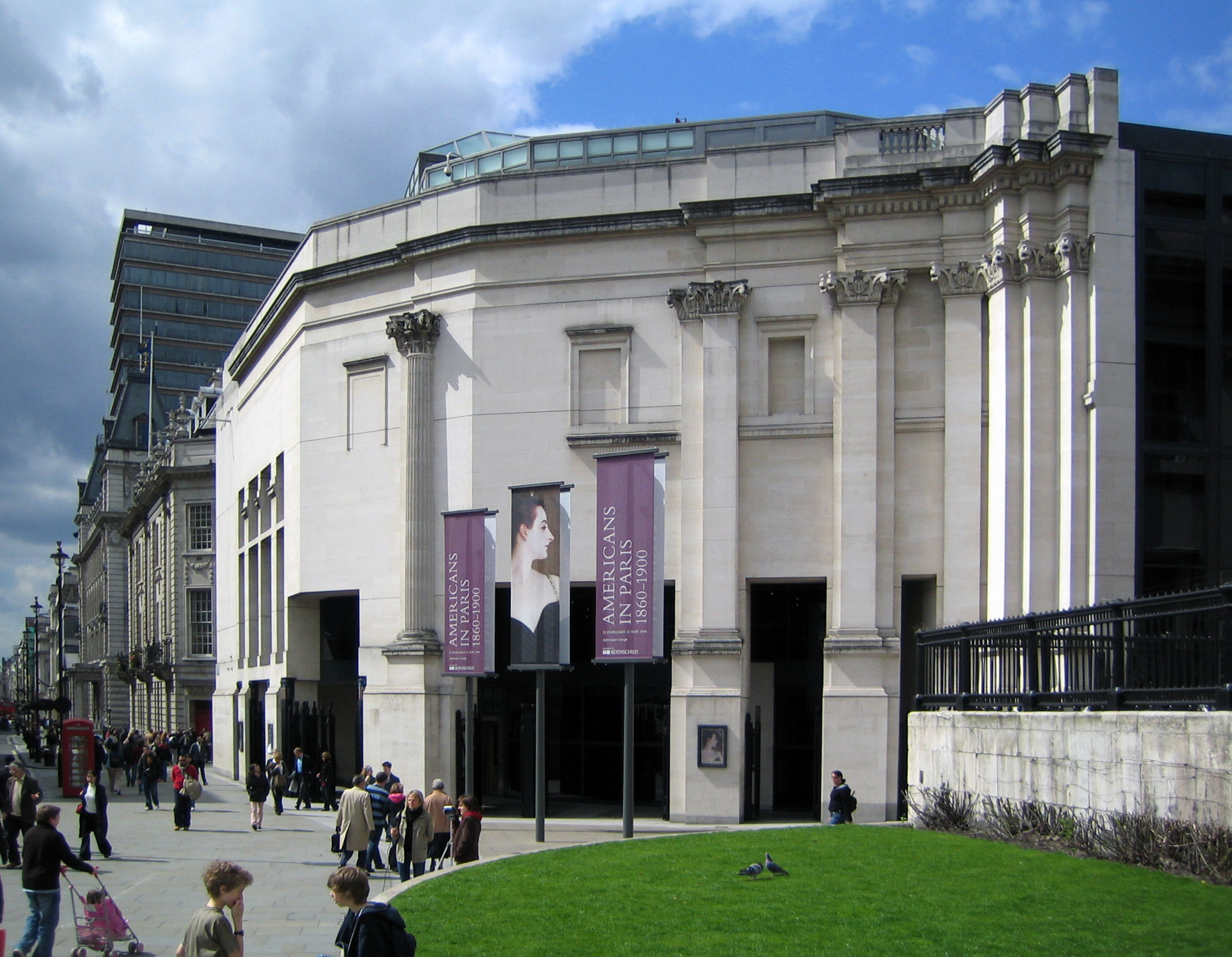
- The Sainsbury Wing, as built, seen from Trafalgar Square
- Interactive map of Sainsbury Wing

History
- Built: 1988–1991

Site notes
- Architect(s): Robert Venturi, Denise Scott Brown and Associates
- Architectural style: Postmodernist

Listed Building – Grade I
- Official name: Sainsbury Wing at the National Gallery
- Designated: 9 May 2018
- Reference no.: 1451082

The most important addition to the building in the late 20th century was the Sainsbury Wing, designed by the postmodernist architects Robert Venturi and Denise Scott Brown to house the collection of Renaissance paintings and built in 1991. The building occupies the "Hampton's site" to the west of the main building, where a department store of the same name had stood until its destruction in the Blitz. The gallery had long sought expansion into this space and in 1982 a competition was held to find a suitable architect; the shortlist included a radical high-tech proposal by Richard Rogers, among others. The design that won the most votes was by the firm Ahrends, Burton and Koralek, who then modified their proposal to include a tower, similar to that of the Rogers scheme. The proposal was dropped after the Prince of Wales compared the design to a "monstrous carbuncle on the face of a much-loved and elegant friend". The term "monstrous carbuncle", for a modern building that clashes with its surroundings, has since become commonplace.

One of the conditions of the 1982 competition was that the new wing had to include commercial offices as well as public gallery space. However, in 1985 it became possible to devote the extension entirely to the gallery's uses, due to a donation of almost £50 million from Lord Sainsbury and his brothers Simon and Sir Tim Sainsbury. A closed competition was held, and the schemes produced were noticeably more restrained than in the earlier competition.

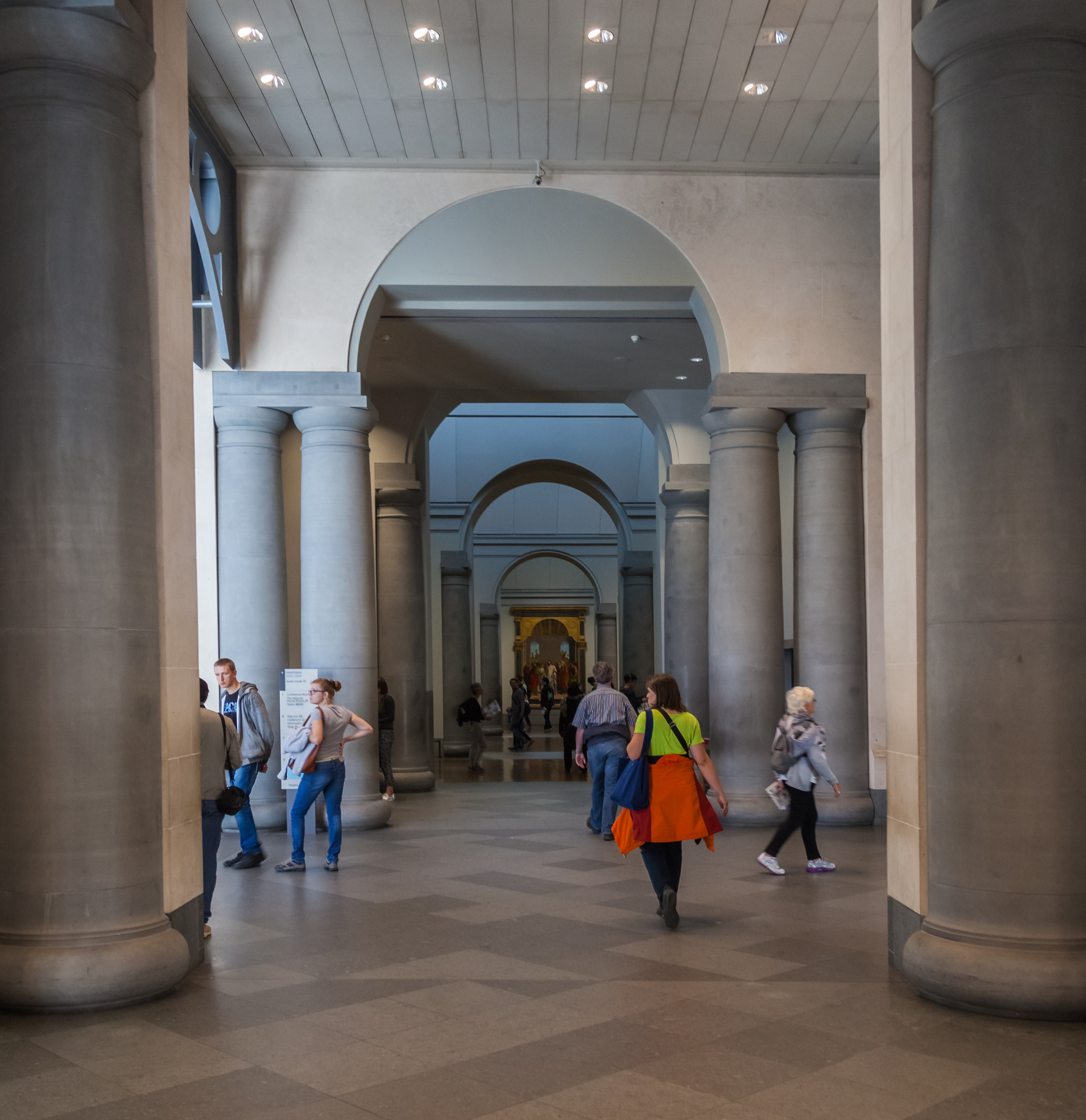
The main enfilade of the Sainsbury Wing

In contrast with the rich ornamentation of the main building, the galleries in the Sainsbury Wing are pared down and intimate, to suit the smaller scale of many of the paintings. The main inspirations for these rooms are Sir John Soane's toplit galleries for the Dulwich Picture Gallery and the church interiors of Filippo Brunelleschi. (The stone dressing is in pietra serena, the grey stone local to Florence.) The northernmost galleries align with Barry's central axis, so that there is a single vista down the whole length of the gallery. This axis is exaggerated by the use of false perspective, as the columns flanking each opening gradually diminish in size until the visitor reaches the focal point (as of 2009), an altarpiece by Cima of The Incredulity of Saint Thomas. Venturi's postmodernist approach to architecture is in full evidence at the Sainsbury Wing, with its stylistic quotations from buildings as disparate as the clubhouses on Pall Mall, the Scala Regia in the Vatican, Victorian warehouses and Ancient Egyptian temples.

Following the pedestrianisation of Trafalgar Square, the gallery is currently engaged in a masterplan to convert the vacated office space on the ground floor into public space. The plan will also fill in disused courtyards and make use of land acquired from the adjoining National Portrait Gallery in St Martin's Place, which it gave to the National Gallery in exchange for land for its 2000 extension. The first phase, the East Wing Project designed by Jeremy Dixon and Edward Jones, opened to the public in 2004. This provided a new ground level entrance from Trafalgar Square, named in honour of Sir Paul Getty. The main entrance was also refurbished, and reopened in September 2005. Possible future projects include a "West Wing Project" roughly symmetrical with the East Wing Project, which would provide a future ground level entrance, and the public opening of some small rooms at the far eastern end of the building acquired as part of the swap with the National Portrait Gallery. This might include a new public staircase in the bow on the eastern façade. No timetable has been announced for these additional projects.

==== Renovation of the Sainsbury Wing ====
In April 2021, a jury short-listed six firms of architects – Caruso St John, David Chipperfield Architects, Asif Kahn, David Kohn Architects, Selldorf Architects, and Witherford Watson Mann Architects – in a competition for design proposals to upgrade the Sainsbury Wing.

A letter written in 1990 by one of the donors, John Sainsbury, was discovered in 2023 during the demolition of two false columns in which he argued that "the false columns are a mistake of the architect and that we would live to regret our accepting this detail of his design."

In 2024, excavations for the Sainsbury Wing extension at Jubilee Walk uncovered evidence that the Anglo-Saxon settlement of Lundenwic extended further to the west than had previously been supposed.

=== St Vincent House extension ===
In September 2025, the National Gallery announced plans to open a new wing, north of the Sainsbury Wing, between Leicester Square and Trafalgar Square. The new site will be formed from St Vincent House, a 1960s building that was acquired by the charity in the late 1990s. Plans for the extension were commissioned in 2018 and announced on 9 September 2025 with a funding commitment of £375 million, which includes two, separate £150 million donations by the Crankstart Foundation and the Julia Rausing Trust. To design and develop the extension, the National Gallery opened an architectural competition, which ran to 17 October 2025 with the shortlist announced on 28 November 2025. On 7 April 2026, the charity announced the winner of the competition was Kengo Kuma and Associates with BDP and MICA (subject to ratification at the end of a standstill period ending 16 April). The extension is expected to open in the early 2030s and have space to present 250 additional paintings.

== Incidents ==
In the National Gallery on 10 March 1914, Velázquez's Rokeby Venus was damaged by Mary Richardson, a campaigner for women's suffrage, in protest against the arrest of Emmeline Pankhurst the previous day. Later that month another suffragette attacked five Bellinis, causing the gallery to close until the start of the First World War, when the Women's Social and Political Union called for an end to violent acts drawing attention to their plight.

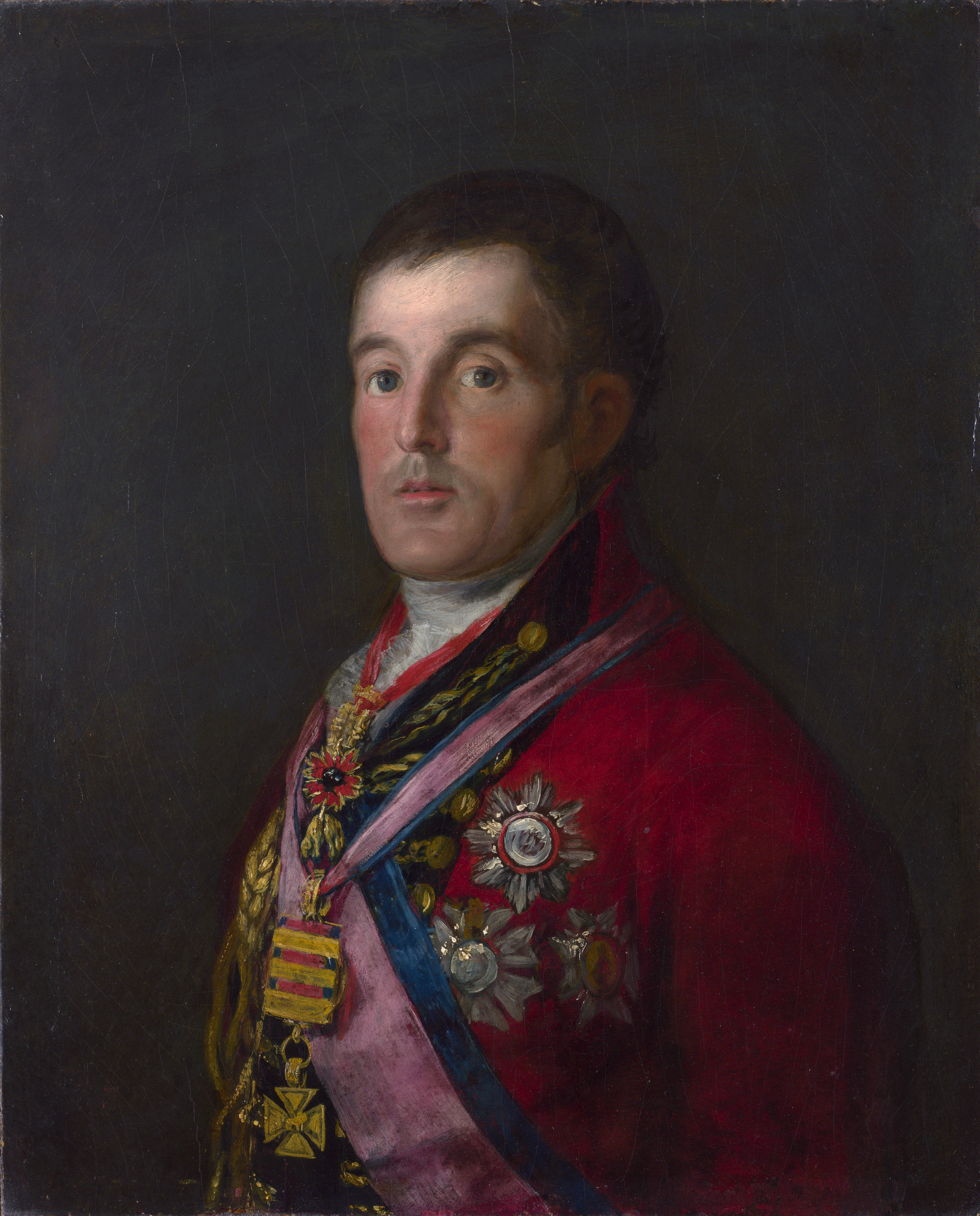
Portrait of the Duke of Wellington by Francisco Goya

In August 1961 an unemployed bus driver, Kempton Bunton, stole Goya's Portrait of the Duke of Wellington, in what remains the only successful theft from the gallery. Four years later, Bunton returned the painting voluntarily. Following a high-profile trial, he was found not guilty of stealing the painting, but guilty of stealing the frame.

In July 1987, a man entered the gallery armed with a shotgun concealed under his coat and shot Leonardo's cartoon of The Virgin and Child with Saint Anne and Saint John the Baptist. The man, Robert Cambridge, told police that his intent had been to express his disgust with "political, social and economic conditions in Britain". Though the pellets did not penetrate the cartoon, it had to undergo extensive restoration. It was placed back on display the following year.

Vincent van Gogh's Sunflowers was attacked at the gallery on 14 October 2022 by environmental activists from the Just Stop Oil campaign, who threw tomato soup at it. Due to the protection of the Plexiglas, the painting was not harmed, but there was some minor damage to the frame, according to a spokesperson for the gallery.

On 6 November 2023, the Rokeby Venus was again attacked, by two Just Stop Oil activists who smashed its protective glass with hammers.

== List of directors ==
Directors (Note: The role of director was created in 1855, 31 years after the gallery's founding.)
Name	Tenure
Sir Charles Lock Eastlake	1855–1865
Sir William Boxall	1866–1874
Sir Frederic William Burton	1874–1894
Sir Edward Poynter	1894–1904
Sir Charles Holroyd	1906–1916
Sir Charles Holmes	1916–1928
Sir Augustus Daniel	1929–1933
Sir Kenneth Clark	1934–1945
Sir Philip Hendy	1946–1967
Sir Martin Davies	1968–1973
Sir Michael Levey	1973–1986
Neil MacGregor	1987–2002
Sir Charles Saumarez Smith	2002–2007
Sir Nicholas Penny	2008–2015
Sir Gabriele Finaldi	2015–present

== Collection highlights ==
- Cimabue: Virgin and Child with Two Angels
- Giotto: Pentecost
- English or French Medieval: Wilton Diptych
- Jan van Eyck: Arnolfini Portrait, Portrait of a Man (Self-Portrait?)
- Pisanello: The Vision of Saint Eustace
- Paolo Uccello: The Battle of San Romano, Saint George and the Dragon
- Rogier van der Weyden: The Magdalen Reading
- Masaccio: Madonna and Child
- Dieric Bouts: The Entombment
- Piero della Francesca: The Baptism of Christ
- Antonello da Messina: Portrait of a Man, Saint Jerome in His Study
- Giovanni Bellini: Agony in the Garden, Madonna del Prato, Portrait of Doge Leonardo Loredan
- Antonio and Piero del Pollaiuolo: Martyrdom of Saint Sebastian
- Sandro Botticelli: The Mystical Nativity, Venus and Mars
- Hieronymus Bosch: Christ Crowned with Thorns
- Leonardo da Vinci: The Virgin and Child with Saint Anne and Saint John the Baptist, Virgin of the Rocks
- Albrecht Dürer: Saint Jerome in the Wilderness
- Michelangelo: The Entombment, The Manchester Madonna
- Jan Gossaert: Adoration of the Kings
- Raphael: Ansidei Madonna, Garvagh Madonna, The Madonna of the Pinks, Portrait of Pope Julius II, Mond Crucifixion, Vision of a Knight
- Titian: Aldobrandini Madonna, Allegory of Prudence, Bacchus and Ariadne, Diana and Actaeon, Diana and Callisto, The Death of Actaeon, A Man with a Quilted Sleeve, Portrait of the Vendramin Family
- Hans Holbein the Younger: The Ambassadors, Portrait of Christina of Denmark
- Parmigianino: Portrait of a Collector, Vision of Saint Jerome
- Agnolo Bronzino: Venus, Cupid, Folly and Time
- Tintoretto: The Origin of the Milky Way
- Pieter Bruegel the Elder: Adoration of the Kings
- Paolo Veronese: Adoration of the Magi, The Conversion of Mary Magdalene, The Family of Darius Before Alexander
- El Greco: Christ Driving the Money Changers from the Temple
- Caravaggio: Boy Bitten by a Lizard, Salome with the Head of John the Baptist, Supper at Emmaus
- Peter Paul Rubens: The Judgement of Paris
- Orazio Gentileschi: The Finding of Moses
- Artemisia Gentileschi: Self-Portrait as Saint Catherine of Alexandria
- Nicolas Poussin: The Adoration of the Golden Calf
- Diego Velázquez: Christ in the House of Martha and Mary, Philip IV in Brown and Silver, Rokeby Venus
- Francisco de Zurbarán: Saint Margaret of Antioch
- Anthony van Dyck: Equestrian Portrait of Charles I, Lord John Stuart and His Brother, Lord Bernard Stuart
- Claude Lorrain: Seaport with the Embarkation of the Queen of Sheba
- Frans Hals: Young Man with a Skull
- Rembrandt: Belshazzar's Feast, Self-Portrait at the Age of 34, Self-Portrait at the Age of 63
- Johannes Vermeer: Lady Seated at a Virginal, Lady Standing at a Virginal
- Meindert Hobbema: The Avenue at Middelharnis
- Canaletto: The Stonemason's Yard
- William Hogarth: The Graham Children, Marriage A-la-Mode
- George Stubbs: Whistlejacket
- Thomas Gainsborough: Mr and Mrs Andrews, The Morning Walk
- Joseph Wright of Derby: An Experiment on a Bird in the Air Pump
- Francisco Goya: Portrait of Doña Isabel de Porcel, Portrait of the Duke of Wellington
- Élisabeth Vigée Le Brun: Self-Portrait in a Straw Hat
- J. M. W. Turner: The Fighting Temeraire, Rain, Steam and Speed – The Great Western Railway
- John Constable: The Cornfield, The Hay Wain
- Jean Auguste Dominique Ingres: Madame Moitessier
- Eugène Delacroix: Ovid Among the Scythians
- Edgar Degas: Miss La La at the Cirque Fernando, Young Spartans Exercising
- Paul Cézanne: Les Grandes Baigneuses
- Claude Monet: La Gare Saint-Lazare, Snow at Argenteuil
- Pierre-Auguste Renoir: A Nymph by a Stream, The Umbrellas
- Henri Rousseau: Tiger in a Tropical Storm (Surprised!)
- Vincent van Gogh: Sunflowers, A Wheatfield with Cypresses
- Georges Seurat: Bathers at Asnières
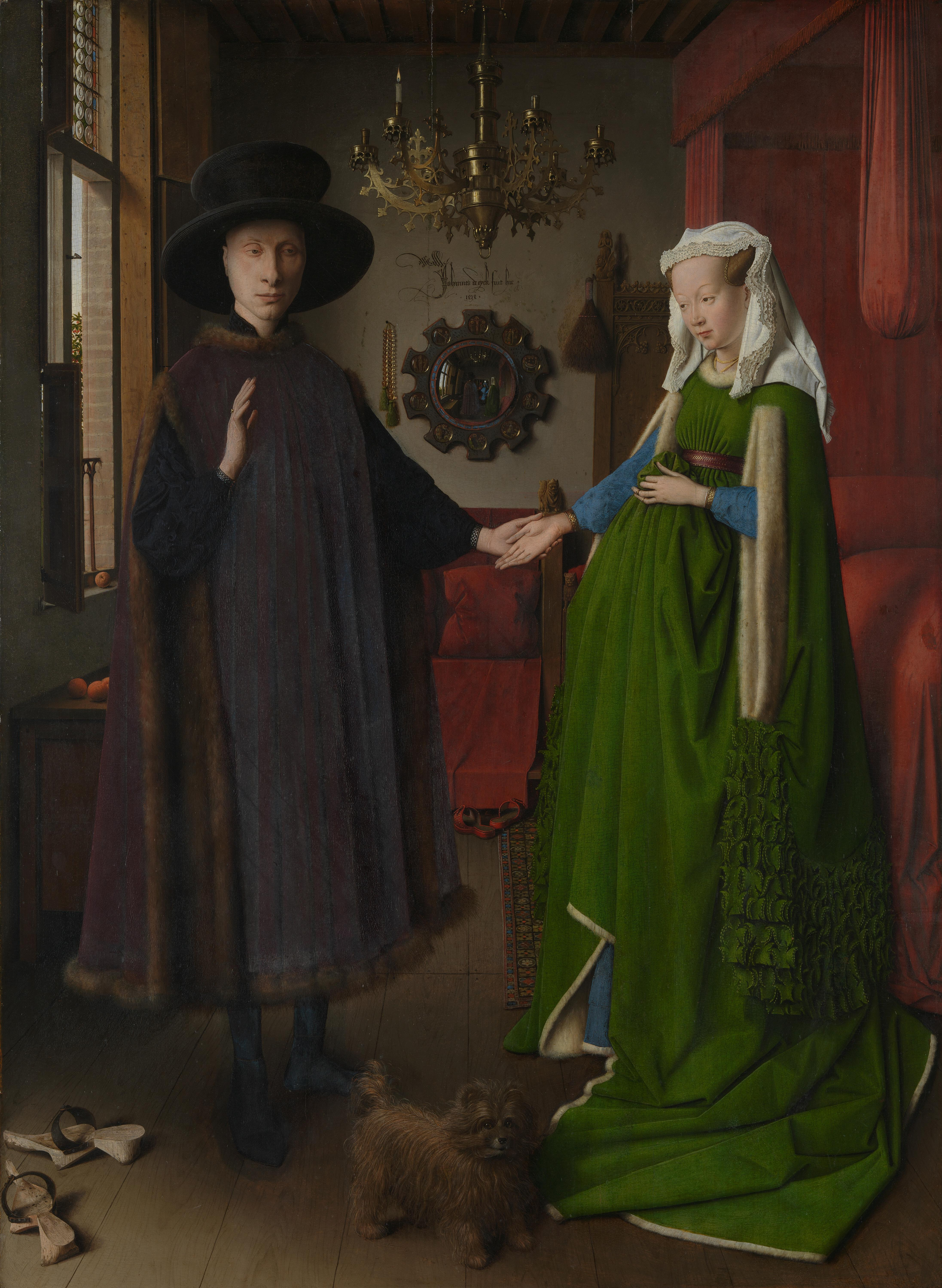
Jan van Eyck
The Arnolfini Portrait

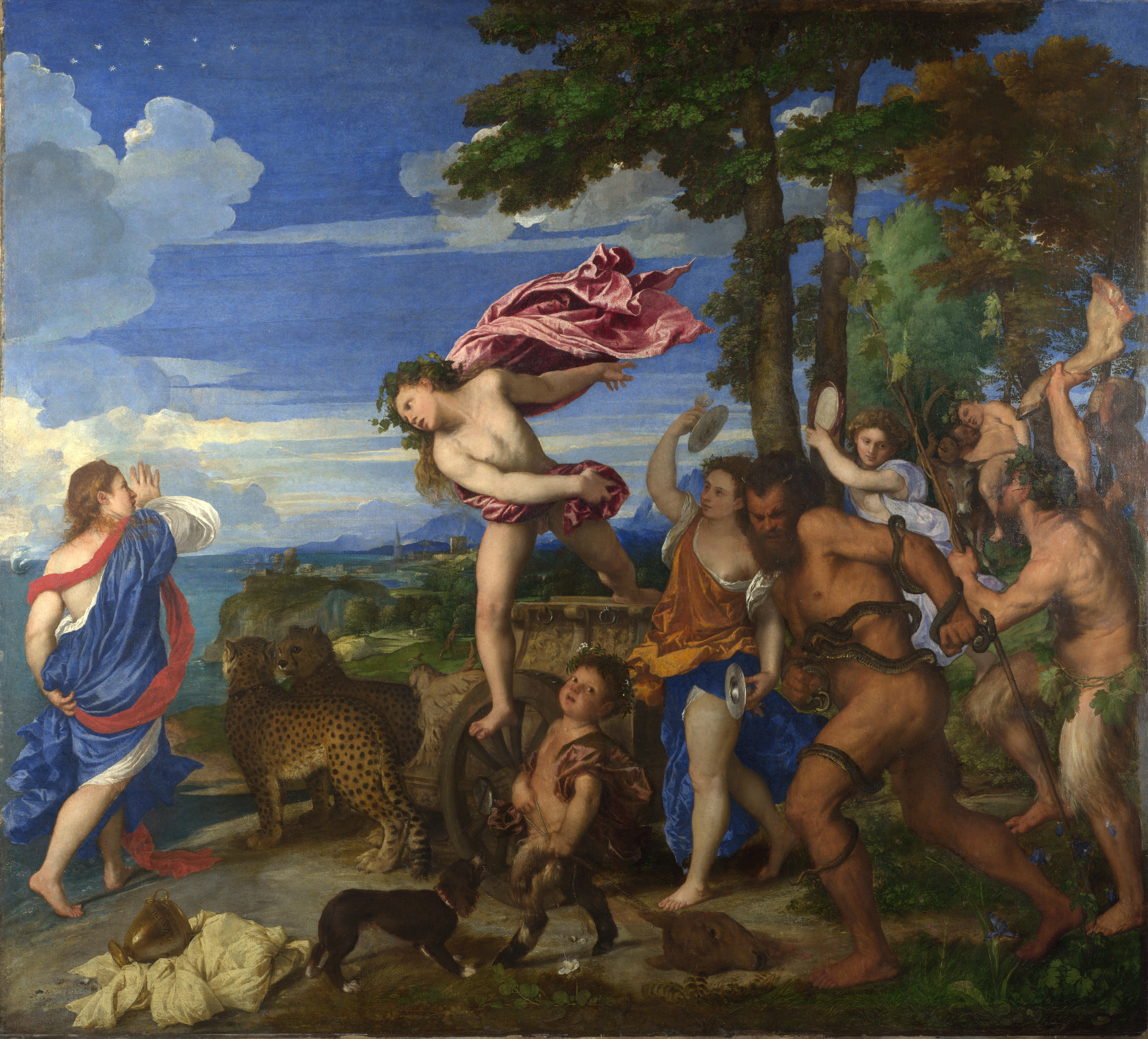
Titian
Bacchus and Ariadne

Hans Holbein the Younger
The Ambassadors

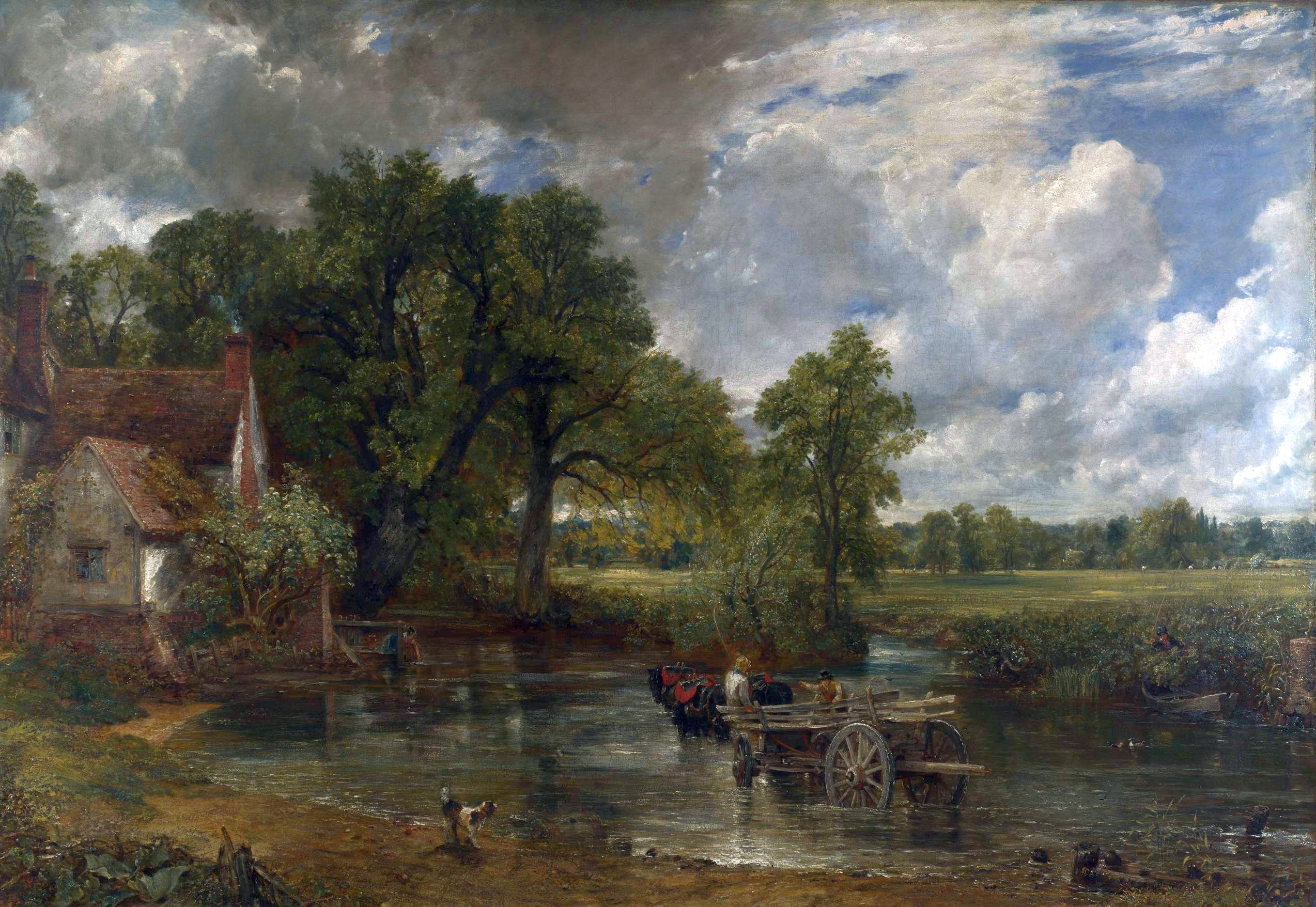
John Constable
The Hay Wain

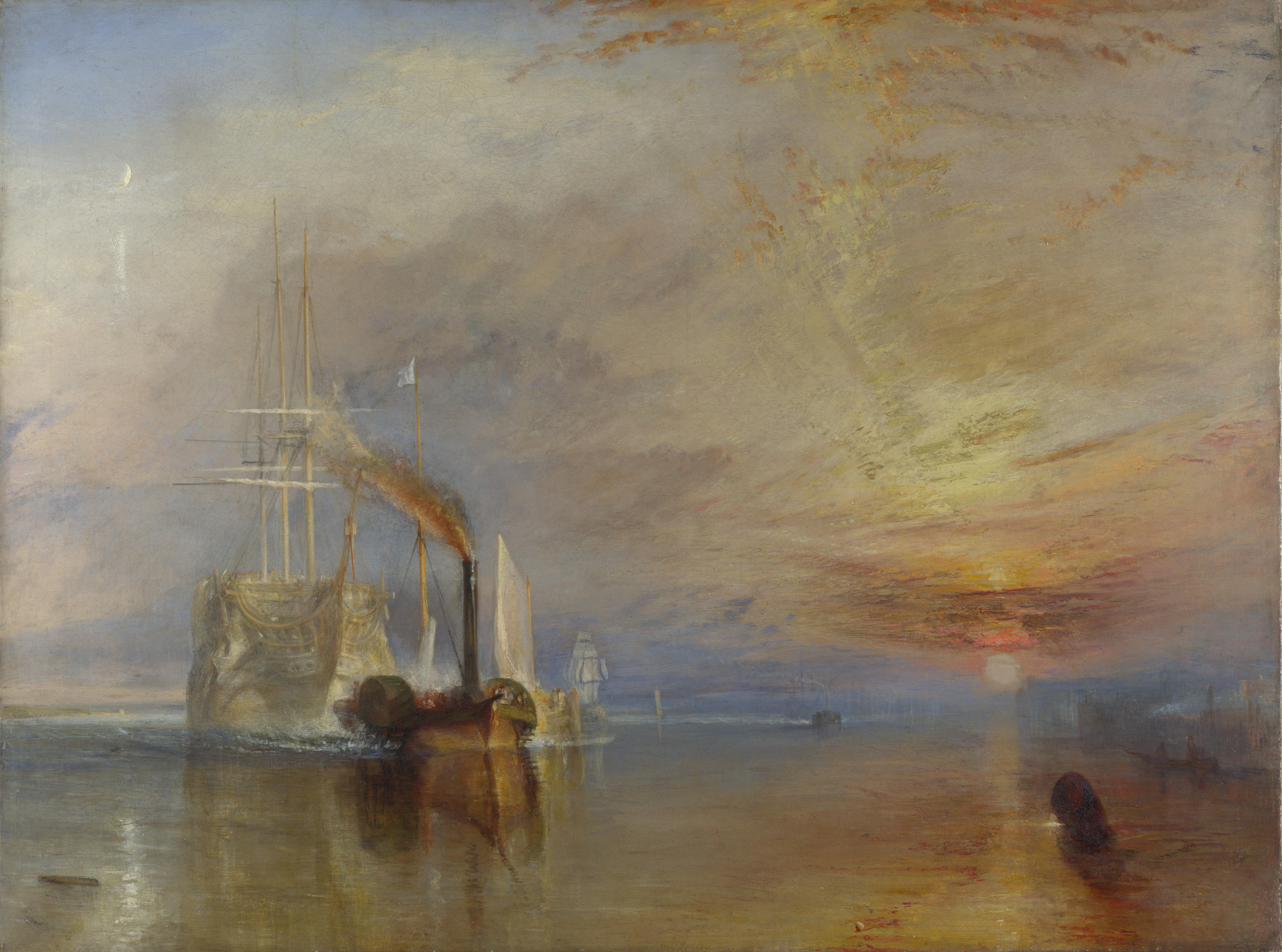
J. M. W. Turner
The Fighting Temeraire

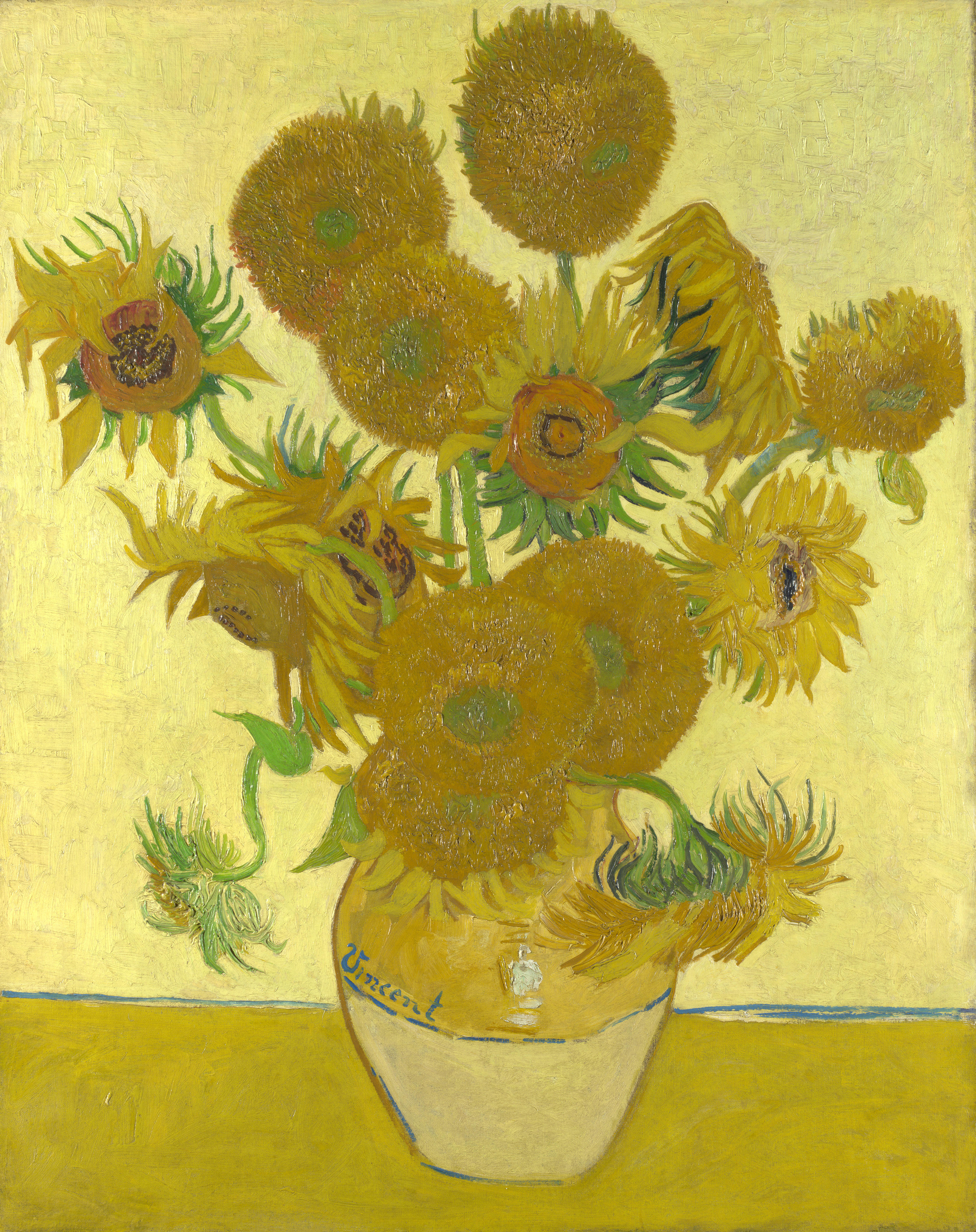
Vincent van Gogh
Sunflowers

== Artists in residence ==
Displays of works by living artists responding to the permanent collection have been a recurring feature of the gallery's exhibitions programme since 1977, when the first of a series of annual exhibitions titled The Artist's Eye was staged. Anthony Caro, Lucian Freud, Francis Bacon and David Hockney were among the artists who contributed to the series, which ran until 1990. In 1980 Maggi Hambling was the first artist to take up residency in the gallery for a year, in a programme which ran until 1989. It was replaced the following year by the Associate Artist Scheme, in which an artist's stay was extended to a period of up to three years; this came to an end in 2016. In 2020 a new Artist in Residence programme was established.

Artists-in-Residence (1980–1989)

- Maggi Hambling (1980–1981)
- Jock McFadyen (1981–1982)
- Michael Porter (1982–1983)
- Kevin O'Brien (1983–1984)
- Hughie O'Donoghue (1984–1985)
- June Redfern (1985–1986)
- Vivien Blackett (1986–1987)
- Philip Mead (1987–1988)
- Madeleine Strindberg (1988–1989)

Associate Artists (1989–2016)

- Paula Rego (1989–1990)
- Ken Kiff (1991–1993)
- Peter Blake (1994–1996)
- Ana Maria Pacheco (1997–1999)
- Ron Mueck (2000–2002)
- John Virtue (2003–2005)
- Alison Watt (2006–2008)
- Michael Landy (2009–2013)
- George Shaw (2014–2016)

Contemporary Fellowship Artist (2020–2022)

- Nalini Malani (2020–2022)

Artists in Residence (2020–present)

- Rosalind Nashashibi (2020)
- Ali Cherri (2022)
- Céline Condorelli (2023)
- Katrina Palmer (2024)
- Ming Wong (2025)

== Transport connections ==
Service	Station/stop	Lines/routes served	Distance from National Gallery
London Buses	Trafalgar Square / Charing Cross Station	24, 29, 176	
London Buses	Trafalgar Square	9, 15, 139	
London Buses	Trafalgar Square / Charing Cross Station	12, 88, 159, 453	
London Buses	Trafalgar Square	12, 15, 23, 88, 139, 159, 453	
London Underground	Leicester Square	Piccadilly line Northern line	0.2-mile walk
London Underground	Charing Cross	Bakerloo line Northern line	
London Underground	Embankment	Bakerloo line Circle line District line Northern line	0.3-mile walk
National Rail	Charing Cross	Southeastern (train operating company)	0.2-mile walk

== See also ==
- List of most visited museums in the United Kingdom
- List of most visited art museums
- List of largest art museums
- Micro gallery, installed in 1991
