= List of painters in the collection of the Rijksmuseum =

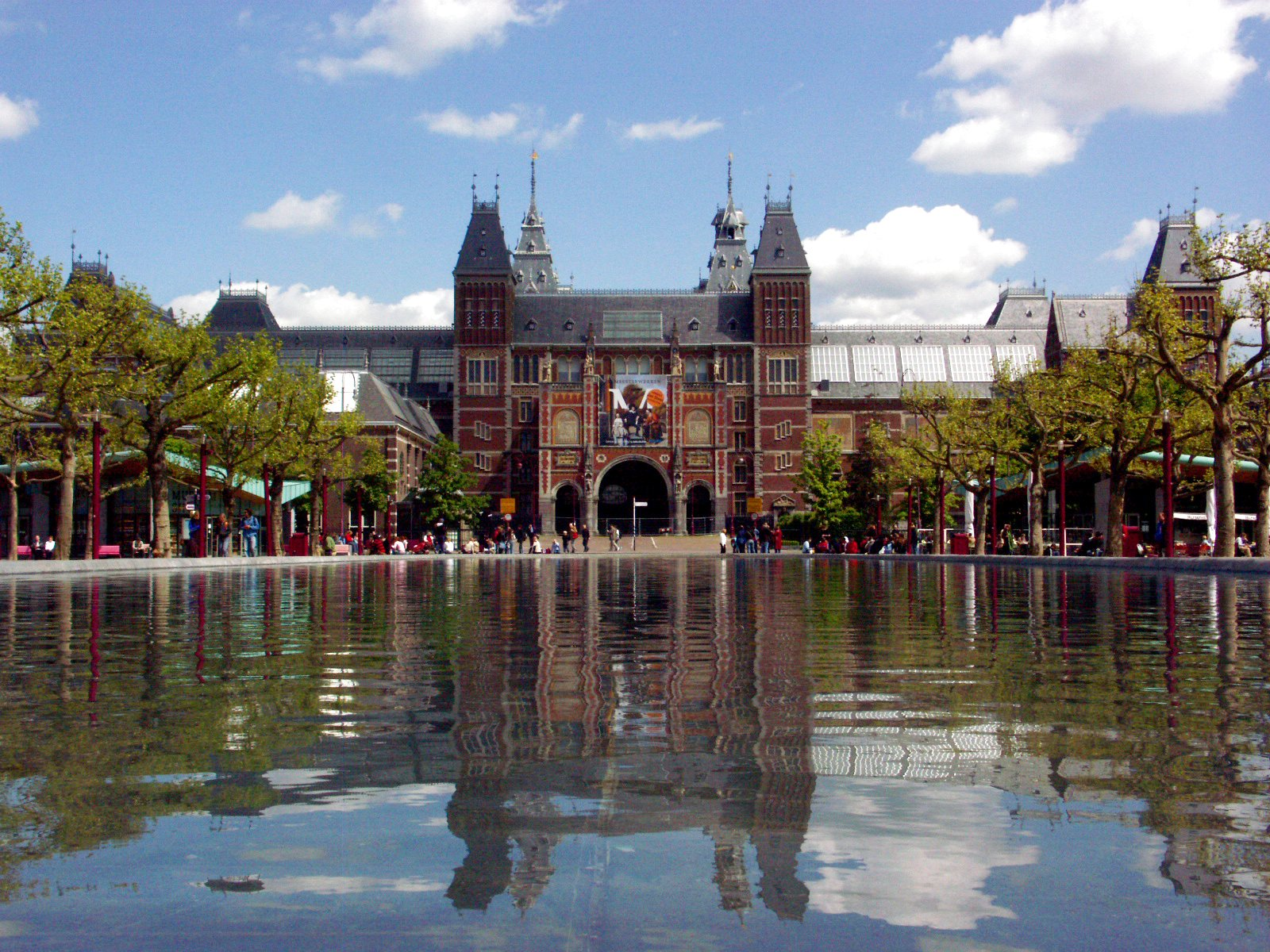

This is an incomplete list of painters in the collection of the Rijksmuseum, with the number of artworks represented, and sorted by century of birth. For more information about the collection which comprises more than 3,000 paintings, see Rijksmuseum. More than 300 works are by unknown or anonymous painters, and though over 1,000 individual artists are in the collection, many of these are represented by only one work. The highlights of the collection are the oldest works such as former altarpieces from Amsterdam churches, but also large works for other former Amsterdam institutions by Pieter Aertsen, Rembrandt, Nicolaes Maes, and Bartholomeus van der Helst. Most of the artists in the collection were born in the 16th and 17th centuries. Only 24 women are represented with works in the collection, most notably Judith Leyster, Gesina ter Borch, Catharina van Hemessen and Rachel Ruysch.

== Born before 1500 ==
- Bellini, Giovanni (Venice, 1435 – Venice, 1516), 4 works
- Bosch, Jheronimus (Den Bosch, 1450 – Den Bosch, 1516), 8 works
- Bulgarini, Bartolommeo (Siena, 1310 – Siena, 1378), 1 work
- Cima da Conegliano (Conegliano, ca. 1459 – Conegliano, 1517/18), 1 work
- Leyden, Aertgen Claeszoon van (Leiden, 1498 – Leiden, 1564), 2 works
- Claeszoon, Allaert (1480–1508), 1 work
- Cleve, Joos van (Kleef, 1485 – Antwerp, 1541), 4 works
- Cock, Jan Wellens de (Leiden, 1480 – Antwerp, 1527), 4 works
- Coninxloo, Jan van (Brussels, 1489–1565), 1 work
- Kunst, Cornelis Corneliszoon (Leiden, 1493 – Leiden, 1544), 3 works
- Oostsanen, Jacob Corneliszoon van (Oostzaan, 1472 – Amsterdam, 1533), 5 works
- Coter, Colijn de (Brussels, 1450 – Brussels, 1532), 1 work
- Coustens, Pieter (Bruges, 1453 – Brussels, 1487), 2 works
- Cranach, Lucas (Kronach, 1472 – Weimar, 1553), 1 work
- Crivelli, Carlo (Venice, 1430/35 – Camerino, 1495), 2 works
- Crivelli, Vittore (Venice, ca. 1440 – Venice, 1501/2), 2 works
- David, Gerard (Oudewater, 1460 – Bruges, 1523), 2 works
- Dürer, Albrecht (Nuremberg, 1471 – Nuremberg, 1528), 1 work
- Engebrechtszoon, Cornelis (Leiden, 1468 – Leiden, 1533), 5 works
- Eyck, Barthélemy d' (France, 1444 – France, 1469), 1 work
- Geertgen tot Sint Jans (Haarlem, 1460 – Haarlem, 1495), 2 works
- Giovanni di Paolo di Grazia (Siena, 1399 – Siena, 1482), 1 work
- Libri, Girolamo dai (Verona, 1474 – Verona, 1555), 1 work
- Goes, Hugo van der (Ghent, 1440 – Auderghem, 1482), 1 work
- Gossaert, Jan (Maubeuge, 1478 – Middelburg, 1532), 1 work
- Heemskerck, Maarten van (Heemskerk, 1498 – Haarlem, 1574), 11 works
- Isenbrant, Adriaen (Bruges, 1485 – Bruges, 1551), 1 work
- Jacobello del Fiore (died Venice, 1439), 2 works
- Jacobszoon, Dirck (Amsterdam, 1497 – Amsterdam, 1567), 7 works
- Joest van Calcar, Jan (Kalkar, 1450 – Haarlem, 1519), 1 work
- Leyden, Lucas van (Leiden, 1494 – Leiden, 1533), 5 works
- Di Tommè, Luca (Siena, 1356 – Siena, 1389), 1 work
- Massijs, Quinten (Leuven, 1466 – Antwerp, 1530), 3 works
- Master of Alkmaar (Alkmaar, 1475 – Alkmaar, 1515), 23 works
- Master of Delft (born Delft, 1470), 4 works
- Master of Frankfurt (Antwerp, 1460–1520), 1 work
- Master of Rhenen (1480–1520), 1 work
- Master of the Spes Nostra (Delft, 1480–1520), 1 work
- Master of the Legend of St. Ursula (Bruges) (Bruges, 1436 – Bruges, 1505), 1 work
- Master of the Lille Adoration (Antwerp, 1510 – Antwerp, 1530), 1 work
- Master of the Amsterdam Death of the Virgin (Amsterdam, 1480 – Utrecht, 1500), 4 works
- Master of Badia a Isola (active c. 1290–1320), 1 work
- Master of the St. Elizabeth Panels (1480–1500), 4 works
- Master of the Figdor Deposition (1480–1500), 2 works
- Master of the legend of St. Barbara (1470–1500), 1 work
- Master of the Legend of the Magdalen (Brussels, 1483 – Brussels, 1530), 2 works
- Master of the Virgo inter Virgines (Delft, 1450 – Delft, 1505), 3 works
- Master of the St. John's Altarpiece (1400–1499), 1 work
- Montagna, Bartolomeo (Orzinuovi, ca. 1450 – Vicenza, 1523), 1 work
- Mostaert, Jan (Haarlem, 1465 – Haarlem, 1553), 6 works
- Orcagna, Andrea di Cione (Florence, 1320 – Florence, 1368), 1 work
- Orley, Bernard van (Brussels, 1490 – Brussels, 1541), 1 work
- Patinir, Joachim (Antwerp, 1480 – Antwerp, 1524), 1 work
- Piero di Cosimo (Florence, 1462 – Florence, 1521), 2 works
- Provoost, Jan (Mons, 1462 – Bruges, 1529), 1 work
- Reymerswale, Marinus van (Reimerswaal, 1490 – Goes, 1546), 1 work
- Rondinello, Nicolò (Venice, 1495 – Ravenna, 1501), 1 work
- Scorel, Jan van (Schoorl, 1495 – Utrecht, 1562), 14 works
- Squarcione, Francesco (Padua, 1397 – Padua, 1468), 1 work
- Swart van Groningen, Jan (Groningen, 1495 – Antwerp, 1560), 1 work
- Vecchietta, Lorenzo di Pietro (Castiglione di Val d'Orcia, ca. 1412 – Siena, 0), 1 work
- Vivarini, Bartolomeo (Murano, 1432 – Murano, 1499), 2 works
- Weyden, Rogier van der (Tournai, 1400 – Brussels, 1464), 1 work

== Born in the 16th century ==
- Aerts, Hendrick (1570–1628), 1 work
- Aertsen, Pieter (Amsterdam, 1508 – Amsterdam, 1575), 8 works
- Anonymous Antwerp Mannerist (Antwerp, 1500–1530), 2 works
- Antum, Aert van (Antwerp, 1579 – Amsterdam, 1620), 2 works
- Anthoniszoon, Cornelis (Amsterdam, 1505 – Amsterdam, 1552), 2 works
- Arentszoon or Cabel, Arent (Amsterdam, 1585 – Amsterdam, 1631), 2 works
- Ast, Balthasar van der (Middelburg, 1593 – Delft, 1656), 2 works
- Avercamp, Hendrick (Amsterdam, 1585 – Kampen, 1634), 4 works
- Baburen, Dirck van (Wijk bij Duurstede, 1595 – Utrecht, 1624), 2 works
- Bailly, David (Leiden, 1584 – Leiden, 1657), 3 works
- Balten, Pieter (Antwerp, 1525 – Antwerp, 1584), 2 works
- Barendszoon, Dirck (Amsterdam, 1534 – Amsterdam, 1592), 5 works
- Bassen, Bartholomeus van (Antwerp, 1590 – The Hague, 1652), 3 works
- Beert, Osias (Antwerp, 1580 – Antwerp, 1623), 2 works
- Beuckelaer, Joachim (Antwerp, 1533 – Antwerp, 1574), 2 works
- Bijlert, Jan van (Utrecht, 1597 – Utrecht, 1671), 2 works
- Bles, Herri met de (Dinant, c151 – Antwerp, 1510), 1 work
- Blocklandt van Montfoort, Anthonie (Montfoort, 1533 – Utrecht, 1583), 1 work
- Bloemaert, Abraham (Gorinchem, 1564 – Utrecht, 1651), 3 works
- Bol, Cornelis (Antwerp, 1589 – Haarlem, 1666), 1 work
- Bollongier, Hans Gilliszoon (Haarlem, 1600 – Haarlem, 1673), 1 work
- Borculo, Nicolaes van (1565–1643), 1 work
- Bosschaert, Ambrosius (Antwerp, 1573 – The Hague, 1621), 1 work
- Bramer, Leonaert (Delft, 1596 – Delft, 1674), 2 works
- Breen, Adam van (Amsterdam, 1585 – Amsterdam, 1642), 2 works
- Breenbergh, Bartholomeus (Deventer, 1598 – Amsterdam, 1657), 2 works
- Bril, Paul (Antwerp, 1554 – Rome, 1626), 2 works
- Brueghel, Jan (Brussels, 1568 – Antwerp, 1624), 6 works
- Terbrugghen, Hendrick (Deventer, 1588 – Utrecht, 1629), 4 works
- Buesem, Jan Janszoon (1599–1649), 1 work
- Bundel, Willem van den (Brussels, 1575 – Delft, 1655), 1 work
- Bunel, Jacob (Blois, 1568 – Paris, 1614), 1 work
- Buys, Cornelis Corneliszoon (II) (1504–1545), 5 works
- Caullery, Louis de (Cambrai, c.1580 – Antwerp, 1621), 2 works
- Claeszoon, Pieter (Berchem, 1597 – Haarlem, 1660), 5 works
- Clerck, Hendrik de (Brussels, 1570 – Brussels, 1630), 2 works
- Codde, Pieter (Amsterdam, 1599 – Amsterdam, 1678), 5 works
- Coffermans, Marcellus (1520–578 ), 1 work
- Coignet, Gillis (Antwerp, 1542 – Antwerp, 1599), 1 work
- Colijns, David (Rotterdam, 1582 – Amsterdam, 1667), 1 work
- Cool, Jan Daemen (Rotterdam, 1589 – Rotterdam, 1660), 1 work
- Haarlem, Cornelis Corneliszoon van (Haarlem, 1562 – Haarlem, 1637), 7 works
- Crabeth, Wouter Pieterszoon (Gouda, 1594 – Gouda, 1643), 1 work
- Crayer, Gaspar de (Antwerp, 1582 – Ghent, 1669), 2 works
- Cronenburg, Adriaen (Bergum, 1540 – Schagen, 1603), 2 works
- Cuyp, Jacob Gerritszoon (Dordrecht, 1594 – Dordrecht, 1652), 2 works
- Dalem, Cornelis van (Antwerp, 1530 – Breda, 1576), 1 work
- Delff, Cornelis Jacobszoon (Gouda, 1570 – Delft, 1643), 1 work
- Delff, Jacob Willemszoon (Delft, 1550 – Delft, 1601), 3 works
- Delff, Willem Jacobszoon (Delft, 1580 – Delft, 1638), 2 works
- Droochsloot, Joost Corneliszoon (Utrecht, 1586 – Utrecht, 1666), 2 works
- Dubus, Mathieu (Flanders, 1590 – The Hague, 1665), 1 work
- Duyster, Willem Corneliszoon (Amsterdam, 1599 – Amsterdam, 1635), 5 works
- Dyck, Anthony van (Antwerp, 1599 – London, 1641), 15 works
- Dyck, Floris van (Haarlem, 1575 – Haarlem, 1651), 1 work
- Eertvelt, Andries van (Antwerp, 1590 – Antwerp, 1652), 2 works
- Elias, Isaac (Amsterdam, 1590–1630), 1 work
- Engelszoon, Cornelis (Gouda, 1574 – Haarlem, 1650), 6 works
- Fogolino, Marcello (Vicenza, ca. 1485 – Vicenza, after 1548), 1 work
- Franchoys, Lucas (Antwerp, 1574 – Antwerp, 1643), 1 work
- Francken, Frans (Antwerp, 1581 – Antwerp, 1642), 3 works
- Gardijn, Guilliam du (Cologne, 1595 – Amsterdam, 1653), 1 work
- Geel, Jacob van (Middelburg, 1585 – Dordrecht, 1648), 1 work
- Geest, Wybrand de (Leeuwarden, 1592 – Leeuwarden, 1661), 16 works
- Geldorp, Gortzius (Leuven, 1553 – Cologne, 1618), 9 works
- Gheyn, Jacob de (Antwerp, 1565 – The Hague, 1629), 1 work
- Girolamo da Treviso (Treviso, ca. 1497 – Boulogne-sur-Mer, 1544), 1 work
- Goltzius, Hendrick (Mulbracht, 1558 – Haarlem, 1617), 3 works
- Goyen, Jan Josefszoon van (Leiden, 1596 – The Hague, 1656), 9 works
- Guercino (Cento, 1591 – Bologna, 1666), 1 work
- Hals, Dirck (Haarlem, 1591 – Haarlem, 1656), 2 works
- Hals, Frans (Antwerp, 1582 – Haarlem, 1666), 11 works
- Heck, Claes Dirckszoon van der (Alkmaar, 1595 – Alkmaar, 1649), 2 works
- Heda, Willem Claeszoon (Haarlem, 1594 – Haarlem, 1680), 3 works
- Hemessen, Catharina van (Antwerp, 1528 – Antwerp, 1587), 1 work
- Hemessen, Jan van (Hemiksem, 1500 – Haarlem, 1575), 1 work
- Henrixz, Simon (1580–1630), 1 work
- Hillegaert, Paulus van (Amsterdam, 1596 – Amsterdam, 1640), 9 works
- Hilliard, Nicholas (Exeter, 1537 – London, 1619), 1 work
- Hondecoeter, Gillis Claeszoon de (Antwerp, 1575 – Amsterdam, 1658), 2 works
- Honthorst, Gerard van (Utrecht, 1592 – Utrecht, 1656), 20 works
- Honthorst, Willem van (Utrecht, 1594 – Utrecht, 1666), 1 work
- Hoogstraten, Dirk van (Antwerp, 1596 – Dordrecht, 1640), 1 work
- Isaacszoon, Isaac (1599–1665), 1 work
- Isaacszoon, Pieter (Helsingør, 1569 – Amsterdam, 1625), 2 works
- Jacobszoon, Lambert (Amsterdam, 1598 – Leeuwarden, 1636), 1 work
- Jonson van Ceulen, Cornelis (London, 1593 – Utrecht, 1661), 5 works
- Jordaens, Jacob (Antwerp, 1593 – Antwerp, 1678), 7 works
- Kessler, Franz (Wetzlar, c.1580 – Gdańsk, 1650), 1 work
- Ketel, Cornelis (Gouda, 1548 – Amsterdam, 1616), 10 works
- Keuninck, Kerstiaen de (Kortrijk, 1560 – Antwerp, 1632), 1 work
- Key, Adriaen Thomaszoon (Antwerp, 1544 – Antwerp, 1589), 4 works
- Key, Willem (Breda, 1515 – Antwerp, 1568), 2 works
- Keyser, Thomas de (Amsterdam, 1596 – Amsterdam, 1667), 11 works
- Kilian, Lucas (Augsburg, 1579 – Augsburg, 1637), 1 work
- Knibbergen, François van (Utrecht, 1596 – The Hague, 1674), 1 work
- Laer, Pieter van (Haarlem, 1592 – Haarlem, 1642), 2 works
- Lastman, Nicolaes (Amsterdam, 1585 – Amsterdam, 1625), 1 work
- Lastman, Pieter (Amsterdam, 1583 – Amsterdam, 1633), 3 works
- Le Nain, Matthieu (Laon, 1593 – Paris, 1648/1677), 1 work
- Loncke, Jacob Lambrechtszoon (Zierikzee, 1580 – Zierikzee, 1656), 2 works
- Malo, Vincent (Cambrai, 1595 – Rome, 1649), 1 work
- Massijs, Cornelis (Antwerp, 1510 – Antwerp, 1557), 1 work
- Mast, Herman van der (1550–1610), 2 works
- Master with the Parrot (Antwerp, 1525 – Antwerp, 1550), 1 work
- Master of the Good Samaritan (Utrecht, 1530–1550), 1 work
- Master of the Brunswick Diptych, 2 works
- Master of the Portraits of Princes (Antwerp, 1530 – Antwerp, 1560), 1 work
- Master of the Female Half-Lengths (Antwerp, 1500 – Antwerp, 1540), 2 works
- Master of the Moucheron family portrait (Antwerp, 1563 – Antwerp, 1563), 1 work
- Master the Antwerp family portraits (Amsterdam, 1540 – Amsterdam, 1560), 1 work
- Master of the Adie Lambertsz Portrait (Friesland, 1582 – 1628), 1 work
- Mierevelt, Michiel Jansz. van (Delft, 1567 – Delft, 1641), 41 works
- Mirou, Anthonie (Antwerp, 1578 – Frankenthal, 1627), 1 work
- Moeyaert, Nicolaes (Durgerdam, 1592 – Amsterdam, 1655), 2 works
- Mol, Peter van (Antwerp, 1599 – Paris, 1650), 1 work
- Molijn, Pieter de (London, 1595 – Haarlem, 1661), 1 work
- Momper, Joos de (Antwerp, 1564 – Antwerp, 1635), 5 works
- Amstel, Jan van (Amsterdam, c150 – Antwerp, 1540), 2 works
- Moreelse, Paulus (Utrecht, 1571 – Utrecht, 1638), 6 works
- Moro, Antonio (Utrecht, 1520 – Antwerp, 1576), 5 works
- Mostaert, Gillis (Hulst, 1528 – Antwerp, 1598), 1 work
- Neefs, Pieter (Antwerp, 1568 – Antwerp, 1656), 2 works
- Neyn, Pieter de (Leiden, 1597 – Leiden, 1638), 1 work
- Nieulandt, Adriaen van (Antwerp, 1587 – Amsterdam, 1658), 4 works
- Nieulandt, Jacob van (Amsterdam, 1593 – Amsterdam, 1634), 1 work
- Nieulandt, Willem van (Antwerp, 1584 – Amsterdam, 1635), 1 work
- Passe II, Crispijn van de (Cologne, 1594 – Amsterdam, 1670), 2 works
- Peeters, Clara (Antwerp, 1580 – Antwerp, 1641), 1 work
- Pickenoy, Nicolaes Eliasz. (Amsterdam, 1588 – Amsterdam, 1655), 17 works
- Pietersz., Aert (Amsterdam, 1550 – Amsterdam, 1612), 7 works
- Pietersz., Pieter (Antwerp, 1540 – Amsterdam, 1603), 7 works
- Poelenburch, Cornelis van (Utrecht, 1595 – Utrecht, 1667), 6 works
- Porcellis, Jan (Ghent, 1584 – Zoeterwoude, 1632), 1 work
- Pot, Hendrik Cornelisz (Amsterdam, 1585 – Amsterdam, 1657), 1 work
- Pourbus, Frans (Bruges, 1545 – Antwerp, 1581), 1 work
- Pourbus, Frans (Antwerp, 1569 – Paris, 1622), 3 works
- Pourbus, Pieter (Gouda, 1523 – Bruges, 1584), 3 works
- Pynas, Jacob Symonsz. (Haarlem, 1592 – Delft, 1650), 1 work
- Pynas, Jan Symonsz. (Alkmaar, 1582 – Amsterdam, 1631), 2 works
- Ravesteyn, Jan Antonisz. van (The Hague, 1572 – The Hague, 1657), 35 works
- Rubens, Peter Paul (Antwerp, 1577 – Antwerp, 1640), 6 works
- Saenredam, Pieter Jansz. (Assendelft, 1597 – Haarlem, 1665), 4 works
- Sarburgh, Bartholomäus (Trier, 1590 – The Hague, 1637), 1 work
- Savery, Hans (Kortrijk, 1564 – Haarlem, 1623), 1 work
- Savery, Hans (Haarlem, 1589 – Utrecht, 1654), 1 work
- Savery, Roelant (Kortrijk, 1576 – Utrecht, 1639), 3 works
- Schooten, Floris van (Haarlem, 1588 – Haarlem, 1656), 1 work
- Schooten, Joris van (Leiden, 1587 – Leiden, 1651), 2 works
- Scrots, Guillaume (England, 1537 – England, 1553), 1 work
- Seghers, Gerard (Antwerp, 1591 – Antwerp, 1651), 1 work
- Seghers, Daniël (Antwerp, 1590 – Antwerp, 1661), 1 work
- Snayers, Peter (Antwerp, 1592 – Brussels, 1666), 1 work
- Snijders, Frans (Antwerp, 1579 – Antwerp, 1657), 1 work
- Stalbemt, Adriaen van (Antwerp, 1580 – Antwerp, 1660), 1 work
- Stap, Jan Woutersz (Amsterdam, 1599 – Amsterdam, 1663), 2 works
- Sustris, Lambert (Amsterdam, 1515 – Venice, 1591), 1 work
- Swanenburg, Isaac Claesz. van (Leiden, 1537 – Leiden, 1614), 1 work
- Sweelink, Gerrit Pietersz. (Amsterdam, 1566 – Amsterdam, 1612), 1 work
- Swinderen, Johannes van (Zutphen, 1594 – Zutphen, 1636), 1 work
- Tengnagel, Jan (Amsterdam, 1584 – Amsterdam, 1635), 2 works
- Tintoretto (Venice, 1518 – Venice, 1594), 2 works
- Torrentius, Johannes (Amsterdam, 1589 – Amsterdam, 1644), 1 work
- Valkenborch, Frederik van (Antwerp, 1566 – Nuremberg, 1623), 1 work
- Valckert, Werner van den (Amsterdam, 1585 – Delft, 1645), 7 works
- Veen, Otto van (Leiden, 1556 – Brussels, 1629), 13 works
- Velde, Esaias van de (Amsterdam, 1587 – The Hague, 1630), 6 works
- Velde, Jan van de (Delft, 1593 – Enkhuizen, 1641), 2 works
- Venne, Adriaen Pietersz. van de (Delft, 1589 – The Hague, 1662), 22 works
- Vermeyen, Jan Cornelisz. (Beverwijk, 1500 – Brussels, 1559), 4 works
- Verspronck, Johannes Cornelisz. (Haarlem, 1600 – Haarlem, 1662), 8 works
- Vinckboons, David (Mechelen, 1576 – Amsterdam, 1629), 5 works
- Vliet, Willem van der (Delft, 1584 – Delft, 1642), 2 works
- Vollenhoven, Herman van (1575–1628), 1 work
- Voort, Cornelis van der (Antwerp, 1576 – Amsterdam, 1624), 14 works
- Vos, Maerten de (Antwerp, 1532 – Antwerp, 1603), 1 work
- Voskuijl, Huijgh Pietersz. (1591–1665), 2 works
- Vrancx, Sebastiaan (Antwerp, 1573 – Antwerp, 1647), 4 works
- Vredeman de Vries, Hans (Leeuwarden, 1527 – Amsterdam, 1607), 1 work
- Vries, Abraham de (Rotterdam, 1590 – The Hague, 1655), 3 works
- Vroom, Cornelis Hendriksz. (Haarlem, 1591 – Haarlem, 1661), 2 works
- Vroom, Hendrik Cornelisz. (Haarlem, 1563 – Haarlem, 1640), 6 works
- Waben, Jacques (Hoorn, 1590 – Hoorn, 1634), 1 work
- Wechelen, Jan van (Antwerp, 1557–1557), 1 work
- Wieringa, Harmen Willems (1597–1644), 3 works
- Wieringen, Cornelis Claesz. van (Haarlem, 1580 – Haarlem, 1633), 1 work
- Wildens, Jan (Antwerp, 1595 – Antwerp, 1653), 1 work
- Willaerts, Adam (London, 1577 – Utrecht, 1664), 6 works
- Wtenbrouck, Moyses van (The Hague, 1590 – The Hague, 1648), 2 works
- Wtewael, Joachim (Utrecht, 1566 – Utrecht, 1638), 1 work
- Zeeuw, Cornelis de (Antwerp, 1558 – Antwerp, 1569), 1 work

== Born in the 17th century ==
- Accama, Bernard (Leeuwarden, 1697 – Leeuwarden, 1756), 2 works
- Aelst, Willem van (Delft, 1627 – Amsterdam, 1683), 1 work
- Alewijn, Abraham (Amsterdam, 1664 – Batavia, 1721), 1 work
- Anraedt, Pieter van (Utrecht, 1635 – Deventer, 1678), 5 works
- Anthonissen, Hendrick van (Amsterdam, 1605 – Amsterdam, 1656), 2 works
- Appel, Jacob (Amsterdam, 1680 – Amsterdam, 1751), 2 works
- Asch, Pieter Jansz. van (Delft, 1603 – Delft, 1678), 1 work
- Asselijn, Jan (Diemen or Dieppe, 1615 – Amsterdam, 1652), 5 works
- Assen, Jan van (Amsterdam, 1635 – Amsterdam, 1695), 1 work
- Attama, J. (1655 – Groningen, 1659), 2 works
- Avercamp, Barend (Kampen, 1612 – Kampen, 1679), 1 work
- Backer, Adriaen (Amsterdam, 1609 – Amsterdam, 1685), 5 works
- Backer, Jacob Adriaensz. (Harlingen, 1608 – Amsterdam, 1651), 7 works
- Baen, Jan de (Haarlem, 1633 – The Hague, 1702), 8 works
- Bakhuizen, Ludolf (Emden, 1631 – Amsterdam, 1708), 24 works
- Ban, Gerbrand (Haarlem, 1612 – Amsterdam, 1652), 1 work
- Bary, Hendrik (Gouda, 1640 – Gouda, 1707), 1 work
- Batist, Karel (1650–1663), 1 work
- Beeckman, Andries (Zutphen, 1630 – Indonesia, 1663), 1 work
- Beeldemaker, Adriaen Cornelisz. (Rotterdam, 1618 – The Hague, 1709), 2 works
- Beelt, Cornelis (Rotterdam, 1607 – Haarlem or Rotterdam, 1664), 1 work
- Beerstraaten, Abraham (Amsterdam, 1643 – Amsterdam, 1675), 3 works
- Beerstraaten, Jan Abrahamsz. (Amsterdam, 1622 – Amsterdam, 1666), 7 works
- Beest, Sybrand van (The Hague, c.1610 – Amsterdam, 1674), 2 works
- Beet, Cornelis de (Utrecht, 1620 – Veenendaal, 1653), 1 work
- Bega, Cornelis Pietersz. (Haarlem, 1620 – Haarlem, 1664), 2 works
- Begeyn, Abraham Jansz. (Leiden, 1637 – Berlin, 1697), 1 work
- Beijeren, Abraham van (The Hague, 1620 – Overschie, 1690), 8 works
- Bellevois, Jacob Adriaensz. (Rotterdam, 1621 – Rotterdam, 1676), 2 works
- Berchem, Nicolaes Pietersz. (Haarlem, 1620 – Amsterdam, 1683), 13 works
- Berckheyde, Gerrit Adriaensz. (Haarlem, 1638 – Haarlem, 1698), 10 works
- Berckheyde, Job Adriaensz. (Haarlem, 1630 – Haarlem, 1692), 2 works
- Berckman, Hendrick (Klundert, 1629 – Middelburg, 1678), 4 works
- Bergen, Dirck van (Haarlem, 1645 – Haarlem, 1689), 3 works
- Bertin, Nicolas (Paris, 1668 – Paris, 1736), 2 works
- Bie, Cornelis de (Lier, 1627 – Lier, 1711), 1 work
- Bisschop, Cornelis (Dordrecht, 1630 – Dordrecht, 1674), 2 works
- Blanchard, Jacques (Paris, 1600 – Paris, 1638), 1 work
- Blarenberghe, Hendrick van (Bailleul, 1646 – Lille, 1712), 1 work
- Bleker, Dirck (Haarlem, 1621 – Haarlem, 1690), 1 work
- Blieck, Daniël de (Middelburg, 1610 – Middelburg, 1673), 1 work
- Blijhooft, Zacharias (Haarlem, 1630 – Middelburg, 1682), 2 works
- Bloemaert, Hendrick (Utrecht, 1601 – Utrecht, 1672), 3 works
- Bloemen, Norbert van (Antwerp, 1670 – Amsterdam, 1746), 1 work
- Bloot, Pieter de (Rotterdam, 1601 – Rotterdam, 1658), 1 work
- Bol, Ferdinand (Dordrecht, 1616 – Amsterdam, 1680), 20 works
- Boone, Daniël (1630–1688), 2 works
- Boonen, Arnold (Dordrecht, 1669 – Amsterdam, 1729), 14 works
- Bor, Paulus (Amersfoort, 1601 – Amersfoort, 1669), 2 works
- Borch, Gerard ter (Zwolle, 1617 – Deventer, 1681), 19 works
- Borch, Gesina ter (Zwolle, 1633 – Deventer, 1690), 1 work
- Borch, Jan (Zwolle, 1600 – Zwolle, 1646), 1 work
- Borman, Johannes (The Hague, 1620 – Amsterdam, 1679), 1 work
- Borselaer, Pieter (Middelburg, 1633 – London, 1687), 2 works
- Borssom, Anthonie van (Amsterdam, 1631 – Amsterdam, 1677), 2 works
- Bosch, Hendrik van den (Amsterdam, 1692 – Batavia, 1736), 1 work
- Both, Andries (Utrecht, 1612 – Venice, 1642), 1 work
- Both, Jan (Utrecht, 1618 – Utrecht, 1652), 6 works
- Boudewijns, Adriaen Fransz (Brussels, 1644 – Brussels, 1719), 1 work
- Boursse, Esaias (Amsterdam, 1631 – at sea, 1672), 1 work
- Bout, Pieter (Brussels, 1630 – Brussels, 1700), 2 works
- Brakenburgh, Richard (Haarlem, 1650 – Haarlem, 1702), 2 works
- Bray, Dirck de (Haarlem, 1635 – Haarlem, 1694), 2 works
- Bray, Jan de (Haarlem, 1627 – Haarlem, 1697), 3 works
- Brekelenkam, Quiringh Gerritsz. van (Zwammerdam, 1622 – Leiden, 1670), 6 works
- Brisé, Cornelis (Haarlem, 1622 – Amsterdam, 1669), 2 works
- Broeck, Elias van den (Antwerp, 1649 – Amsterdam, 1708), 2 works
- Bronckhorst, Jan Gerritsz. van (Utrecht, 1603 – Amsterdam, 1661), 1 work
- Brouwer, Adriaen (Oudenaarde, 1605 – Antwerp, 1638), 8 works
- Bruyn, Cornelis de (Utrecht, 1652 – Utrecht, 1726), 1 work
- Burgh, Hendrick van der (Delft, 1627 – Delft, 1664), 2 works
- Burgh, R. van (1658–1688), 1 work
- Buytewech, Willem Willemsz. (Rotterdam, 1624 – Rotterdam, 1670), 2 works
- Calraet, Abraham van (Dordrecht, 1642 – Dordrecht, 1722), 1 work
- Camerarius, Adam (died 1666), 1 work
- Camphuysen, Govert Dircksz. (Gorinchem, 1623 – Amsterdam, 1672), 1 work
- Cappelle, Jan van de (Amsterdam, 1626 – Amsterdam, 1679), 4 works
- Carlevarijs, Luca (Udine, 1663 – Venice, 1730), 1 work
- Carré, Hendrik (Amsterdam, 1656 – The Hague, 1720), 1 work
- Carré, Hendrik (The Hague, 1696 – The Hague, 1775), 2 works
- Cerezo, Mateo the Younger (Burgos, 1637 – Madrid, 1666), 1 work
- Claesz, Jan (died d.1636 ), 3 works
- Claeuw, Jacques de (Dordrecht, 1623 – Leiden, 1694), 1 work
- Coeman, Jacob (Amsterdam, 1632 – Batavia, 1676), 2 works
- Colasius, Johan George (Utrecht, 1698 – Utrecht, 1736), 1 work
- Collier, Edwaert (Breda, 1642 – London, 1708), 1 work
- Colonia, Adam (Rotterdam, 1634 – London, 1685), 1 work
- Conflans, Adriaen van (died 1607), 1 work
- Coninck, David de (Antwerp, 1642 – Brussels, 1701), 3 works
- Coorte, Adriaen (Middelburg, 1660 – Middelburg, 1707), 4 works
- Craey, Dirck (1600–1665), 2 works
- Cuyp, Aelbert (Dordrecht, 1620 – Dordrecht, 1691), 8 works
- Cuyp, Benjamin Gerritsz. (Dordrecht, 1612 – Dordrecht, 1652), 3 works
- Dalens, Dirck (Dordrecht, 1600 – Zierikzee, 1676), 1 work
- Danckerts de Rij, Pieter (Amsterdam, 1605 – Rudnik nad Sanem, 1660), 1 work
- Decker, Cornelis Gerritsz. (Haarlem, 1618 – Haarlem, 1678), 1 work
- Decker, Frans (Haarlem, 1684 – Haarlem, 1751), 1 work
- Delen, Dirck van (Heusden, 1605 – Arnemuiden, 1671), 5 works
- Delff, Jacob Willemsz. (Delft, 1619 – Delft, 1661), 3 works
- Denner, Balthasar (Altona, 1685 – Rostock, 1749), 2 works
- Diepraam, Abraham (Rotterdam, 1622 – Rotterdam, 1670), 1 work
- Diest, Jeronymus van (The Hague, 1631 – The Hague, 1687), 2 works
- Diest, Johan van (1695–1757), 1 work
- Diest, Willem van (The Hague, 1600 – The Hague, 1678), 1 work
- Dijck, Abraham van (Amsterdam, 1635 – Dordrecht, 1680), 1 work
- Dijk, Philip van (Oud-Beijerland, 1683 – The Hague, 1753), 15 works
- Doomer, Lambert (Amsterdam, 1624 – Amsterdam, 1700), 1 work
- Dou, Gerard (Leiden, 1613 – Leiden, 1675), 7 works
- Dowe, Douwe Juwes de (Leeuwarden, 1608–1663), 1 work
- Droochsloot, Cornelis (Utrecht, 1630 – Utrecht, 1673), 1 work
- Druyf, Dirk (Leiden, 1610–1699), 1 work
- Dubois, Guillam (Haarlem, 1623 – Haarlem, 1661), 1 work
- Dubbels, Hendrick Jacobsz. (Amsterdam, 1621 – Amsterdam, 1707), 3 works
- Dubois, Simon (Antwerp, 1632 – London, 1708), 2 works
- Dubordieu, Pieter (L'Île-Bouchard, 1609 – Amsterdam, 1678), 3 works
- Duck, Jacob (Utrecht, 1600 – Utrecht, 1667), 2 works
- Dujardin, Karel (Amsterdam, 1626 – Venice, 1678), 9 works
- Dusart, Christiaen Jansz (Antwerp, 1618 – Amsterdam, 1682), 1 work
- Dusart, Cornelis (Haarlem, 1660 – Haarlem, 1704), 1 work
- Duynen, Isaac van (Dordrecht, 1628 – The Hague, 1681), 1 work
- Eeckhout, Gerbrand van den (Amsterdam, 1621 – Amsterdam, 1674), 4 works
- Egmondt, Pieter Cornelisz (Leiden, 1618–1673), 1 work
- Elliger, Ottmar (Gothenburg, 1633 – Berlin, 1679), 2 works
- Esselens, Jacob (Amsterdam, 1626 – Amsterdam, 1687), 2 works
- Essen, Jan van (Antwerp, 1640 – Naples, 1684), 1 work
- Everdingen, Allaert van (Alkmaar, 1621 – Amsterdam, 1675), 3 works
- Everdingen, Cesar Boetius van (Alkmaar, 1617 – Alkmaar, 1678), 4 works
- Eversdijck, Willem (Goes, 1618 – Middelburg, 1671), 4 works
- Eyck, Nicolaas van (Antwerp, 1617 – Antwerp, 1679), 1 work
- Fabritius, Barent (Middenbeemster, 1624 – Amsterdam, 1673), 4 works
- Fabritius, Carel (Middenbeemster, 1622 – Delft, 1654), 3 works
- Falens, Carel van (Antwerp, 1683 – Paris, 1733), 1 work
- Ferguson, Henry (The Hague, 1665 – Toulouse, 1730), 1 work
- Ferguson, William Gowe (Scotland, 1632 – Scotland, 1700), 2 works
- Flinck, Govert (Cleves, 1615 – Amsterdam, 1660), 12 works
- Gallis, Pieter (Enkhuizen, 1633 – Hoorn, 1697), 2 works
- Geel, Joost van (Rotterdam, 1631 – Rotterdam, 1698), 1 work
- Gelder, Aert de (Dordrecht, 1645 – Dordrecht, 1727), 7 works
- Genoels, Abraham (Antwerp, 1640 – Antwerp, 1723), 2 works
- Gijsels, Peeter (Antwerp, 1621 – Antwerp, 1690), 2 works
- Glauber, Johannes (Utrecht, 1646 – Schoonhoven, 1726), 9 works
- Gool, Jan van (The Hague, 1685 – The Hague, 1763), 2 works
- Goor, Gerrit van (died Amsterdam, 1695), 1 work
- Gotingh, Jan van (died 1697), 1 work
- Graat, Barend (Amsterdam, 1628 – Amsterdam, 1709), 5 works
- Graef, Timotheus de (1640–1718), 1 work
- Grebber, Pieter Fransz. de (Haarlem, 1600 – Haarlem, 1653), 1 work
- Griffier, Jan (Amsterdam, 1646 – London, 1718), 1 work
- Groenewegen, Pieter Anthonisz. van (Delft, 1600 – The Hague, 1658), 1 work
- Gysaerts, Gualterus (Antwerp, 1649 – Mechelen, 1674), 1 work
- Haagen, Joris van der (Arnhem, 1615 – The Hague, 1669), 3 works
- Hackaert, Jan (Amsterdam, 1628 – Amsterdam, 1685), 4 works
- Haensbergen, Jan van (Gorinchem, 1642 – The Hague, 1705), 2 works
- Halen, Peter van (Amsterdam, 1673 – Amsterdam, 1732), 6 works
- Hanneman, Adriaen (The Hague, 1603 – The Hague, 1671), 3 works
- Hannot, Johannes (1633–1684), 1 work
- Haringh, Daniël (The Hague, 1636 – The Hague, 1713), 2 works
- Hecken, Abraham van den (Antwerp, 1610 – Amsterdam, 1655), 2 works
- Heda, Gerret Willemsz. (Haarlem, 1622 – Haarlem, 1649), 1 work
- Heem, Jan Davidsz. de (Utrecht, 1606 – Antwerp, 1683), 4 works
- Heeremans, Thomas (Haarlem, 1641 – Haarlem, 1694), 1 work
- Heerschop, Hendrick (Haarlem, 1626 – Haarlem, 1690), 2 works
- Helmbreeker, Dirck (Haarlem, 1633 – Rome, 1696), 1 work
- Helst, Bartholomeus van der (Haarlem, 1613 – Amsterdam, 1670), 16 works
- Helst, Lodewijk van der (Amsterdam, 1642 – Amsterdam, 1693), 3 works
- Helt, Jeremias van der (Antwerp, 1646–1676), 1 work
- Hemert, Jan van (1620–1645), 1 work
- Hennekyn, Paulus (1612–1672), 2 works
- Heusch, Willem de (Utrecht, 1625 – Utrecht, 1692), 2 works
- Heyden, Jan van der (Gorinchem, 1637 – Amsterdam, 1712), 4 works
- Hobbema, Meindert (Amsterdam, 1638 – Amsterdam, 1709), 2 works
- Hoet, Gerard (Zaltbommel, 1648 – The Hague, 1733), 2 works
- Hogers, Jacob (Deventer, 1614 – Deventer, 1660), 3 works
- Hollar, Wenzel (Prague, 1607 – London, 1677), 2 works
- Holsteyn, Pieter (Haarlem, 1614 – Haarlem, 1673), 1 work
- Hondecoeter, Gijsbert Gillisz. de (Utrecht, 1604 – Utrecht, 1653), 2 works
- Hondecoeter, Melchior d' (Utrecht, 1636 – Amsterdam, 1695), 12 works
- Hondius, Abraham Daniëlsz. (Rotterdam, 1631 – London, 1691), 2 works
- Hondt, Lambert de (c.1640s – Brussels, 1709), 2 works
- Hooch, Charles Cornelisz. De (Haarlem, 1603 – Utrecht, 1638), 1 work
- Hooch, Pieter de (Rotterdam, 1629 – Amsterdam, 1683), 7 works
- Horemans, Jan Josef (I) (Antwerp, 1682 – Antwerp, 1759), 1 work
- Houbraken, Arnold (Dordrecht, 1660 – Amsterdam, 1719), 2 works
- Houckgeest, Gerard (The Hague, 1600 – Bergen op Zoom, 1661), 1 work
- Huchtenburg, Jan van (Haarlem, 1647 – Amsterdam, 1733), 3 works
- Huysum, Jan van (Amsterdam, 1682 – Amsterdam, 1749), 6 works
- Hulst, Frans de (Haarlem, 1606 – Haarlem, 1661), 1 work
- Hupin, Jacques (active in mid-17th century), 1 work
- Jacobsz., Juriaen (Hamburg, 1624 – Leeuwarden, 1685), 1 work
- Jonson van Ceulen the Younger, Cornelis (London, 1634 – Utrecht, 1715), 1 work
- Jongh, Claude de (Utrecht, 1605 – Utrecht, 1663), 1 work
- Jongh, Jan de (The Hague, 1625 – Haarlem, 1674), 1 work
- Jongh, Ludolf de (Overschie, 1616 – Rotterdam, 1679), 3 works
- Kalf, Willem (Rotterdam, 1619 – Amsterdam, 1693), 3 works
- Kamper, Godaert (Düsseldorf, 1614 – Leiden, 1679), 2 works
- Kessel, Jan (Amsterdam, 1641 – Amsterdam, 1680), 3 works
- Kessel, Jan van (Antwerp, 1626 – Antwerp, 1679), 1 work
- Kick, Simon (Delft, 1603 – Amsterdam, 1652), 1 work
- Klomp, Albert Jansz. (1616 – Amsterdam, 1688), 2 works
- Kneller, Gottfried (Lübeck, 1646 – London, 1723), 3 works
- Knüpfer, Nicolaes (Leipzig, 1609 – Utrecht, 1655), 2 works
- Koets, Roelof (Zwolle, 1640 – Zwolle, 1725), 3 works
- Koninck, Philips (Amsterdam, 1619 – Amsterdam, 1688), 5 works
- Koninck, Salomon (Amsterdam, 1609 – Amsterdam, 1656), 1 work
- Kuijl, Gerard van (Gorinchem, 1604 – Gorinchem, 1673), 3 works
- Lachtropius, Nicolaes (Amsterdam, 1640 – Alphen aan den Rijn, 1700), 1 work
- Lagoor, Johan de (Haarlem, 1620 – Haarlem, 1660), 1 work
- Lairesse, Gerard de (Liège, 1640 – Amsterdam, 1711), 14 works
- Landsberghs (1719–1719), 1 work
- Leemans, Anthonie (The Hague, 1631 – Amsterdam, 1673), 1 work
- Leemans, Johannes (The Hague, 1633 – The Hague, 1688), 1 work
- Lelienbergh, Cornelis (1610–1676), 3 works
- Lesire, Paulus (Dordrecht, 1611 – The Hague, 1664), 7 works
- Leveck, Jacobus (Dordrecht, 1634 – Dordrecht, 1675), 1 work
- Leyden, Jan van (Rotterdam, 1661 – Rotterdam, 1690s), 2 works
- Leyster, Judith (Haarlem, 1609 – Heemstede, 1660), 2 works
- Liedts, Abraham (died 1660), 1 work
- Lievens, Jan (Leiden, 1607 – Amsterdam, 1674), 10 works
- Lievens, Jan Andrea (Antwerp, c.1640 – Amsterdam, 1708), 2 works
- Limborch, Hendrik van (1681–1759), 4 works
- Lingelbach, Johannes (Frankfurt am Main, 1622 – Amsterdam, 1674), 14 works
- Loef, Jacob Gerritsz (Enkhuizen, 1607 – Hoorn, 1670), 2 works
- Loo, Jacob van (Sluis, 1614 – Paris, 1670), 4 works
- Looten, Jan (Amsterdam, 1618 – England, 1683), 1 work
- Lorme, Anthonie de (Doornik, 1610 – Rotterdam, 1673), 1 work
- Lubienitzki, Christoffel (Szczecin, 1659 – Amsterdam, 1729), 5 works
- Lundens, Gerrit (Amsterdam, 1622 – Amsterdam, 1683), 1 work
- Luttichuys, Isaack (London, 1616 – Amsterdam, 1673), 2 works
- Luttichuys, Simon (London, 1610 – Amsterdam, 1661), 1 work
- Maes, Nicolaes (Dordrecht, 1634 – Amsterdam, 1693), 17 works
- Man, Cornelis de (Delft, 1621 – Delft, 1706), 3 works
- Marrel, Jacob (Frankenthal, 1613 – Frankfurt-am-Main, 1681), 2 works
- Marseus van Schrieck, Otto (Nijmegen, 1619 – Amsterdam, 1678), 2 works
- Martszen de Jonge, Jan (Haarlem, 1609 – Haarlem, 1647), 1 work
- Matham, Theodor (Haarlem, 1605 – Amsterdam, 1676), 1 work
- Maton, Bartholomeus (Leiden, 1641 – Stockholm, 1684), 1 work
- Mazo, Juan Bautista Martinez del (Cuenca, Spain, 1610/15 – Madrid, 1667), 1 work
- Meerhout, Jan (Gorinchem, 1630 – Amsterdam, 1677), 1 work
- Meerman, Hendrik (1605–1650), 2 works
- Meijer, Hendrick de (Rotterdam, 1620 – Rotterdam, 1689), 3 works
- Mesdach, Salomon (Middelburg, c1600 – Middelburg, 1632), 9 works
- Metsu, Gabriël (Leiden, 1629 – Amsterdam, 1667), 6 works
- Meulen, Adam Frans van der (Brussels, 1632 – Paris, 1690), 1 work
- Meyer, Jan de (Rotterdam, c1690 – Rotterdam, 1740), 1 work
- Mieris, Frans van (Leiden, 1635 – Leiden, 1681), 4 works
- Mieris, Frans van (Leiden, 1689 – Leiden, 1763), 3 works
- Mieris, Willem van (Leiden, 1662 – Leiden, 1747), 4 works
- Mignon, Abraham (Frankfurt am Main, 1640 – Utrecht, 1679), 7 works
- Mij, Hieronymus van der (Leiden, 1687 – Leiden, 1761), 1 work
- Mijn, Herman van der (Amsterdam, 1684 – London, 1741), 1 work
- Mijtens, Daniël (The Hague, 1644 – The Hague, 1688), 1 work
- Mijtens, Johannes (The Hague, 1614 – The Hague, 1670), 13 works
- Molenaer, Jan Miense (Haarlem, 1610 – Haarlem, 1688), 1 work
- Monogrammist I.W. (Pre-Rembrandtist) (1600–1699), 1 work
- Monogrammist IVA (1645–1645), 1 work
- Monogrammist LVDV (Laurens van der Veken) (Antwerp, 1600 – 1624), 1 work
- Moor, Carel de (Leiden, 1655 – Warmond, 1738), 2 works
- Moucheron, Frederik de (Emden, 1633 – Amsterdam, 1686), 2 works
- Moucheron, Isaac de (Amsterdam, 1667 – Amsterdam, 1744), 1 work
- Mulier, Pieter (Haarlem, 1600 – Haarlem, 1659), 1 work
- Murant, Emanuel (Amsterdam, 1662 – Leeuwarden, 1700), 1 work
- Murillo, Bartolomé Esteban (Sevilla, 1617 – Sevilla, 1682), 1 work
- Musscher, Michiel van (Rotterdam, 1645 – Amsterdam, 1705), 9 works
- Mytens, Martin (1648–1736), 1 work
- Naiveu, Matthijs (Leiden, 1647 – Amsterdam, 1721), 2 works
- Nason, Pieter (Amsterdam, 1612 – The Hague, 1690), 1 work
- Neck, Jan van (Naarden, 1635 – Amsterdam, 1714), 1 work
- Neer, Aert van der (Amsterdam, 1603 – Amsterdam, 1677), 6 works
- Neer, Eglon van der (Amsterdam, 1634 – Düsseldorf, 1703), 1 work
- Netscher, Caspar (Heidelberg, 1639 – The Hague, 1684), 21 works
- Netscher, Constantijn (The Hague, 1668 – The Hague, 1723), 2 works
- Netscher, Theodorus (Bordeaux, 1661 – The Hague, 1728), 3 works
- Nickelen, Isaak van (Haarlem, 1632 – Haarlem, 1702), 1 work
- Nolpe, Pieter (1613–1652), 1 work
- Nooms, Reinier (Amsterdam, 1623 – Amsterdam, 1664), 6 works
- Noordt, Jan van (Amsterdam, 1623 – Amsterdam, 1681), 3 works
- Noort, Pieter van (1622–1672), 2 works
- Nouts, Michiel (1628–1693), 1 work
- Ochtervelt, Jacob (Rotterdam, 1634 – Amsterdam, 1682), 2 works
- Odekerken, Willem van (Nijmegen, 1610 – Delft, 1677), 1 work
- Oever, Hendrick ten (Zwolle, 1639 – Zwolle, 1716), 3 works
- Olis, Jan (Gorinchem, 1610 – Heusden, 1676), 1 work
- Ormea, Willem (Utrecht, 1610 – Utrecht, 1680), 1 work
- Ostade, Adriaen van (Haarlem, 1610 – Haarlem, 1685), 10 works
- Ostade, Isaac van (Haarlem, 1621 – Haarlem, 1649), 1 work
- Ovens, Jürgen (Tonning, 1623 – Friedrichstadt, 1678), 4 works
- Pacx, Henri Ambrosius (Amsterdam, 1603 – Amsterdam, 1668), 1 work
- Paepe, Joost de (Antwerp, 0 – Rome, 1646), 1 work
- Palamedesz., Anthonie (Delft, 1601 – Amsterdam, 1673), 8 works
- Palin, Martin (1680 – Jakarta, 1700), 1 work
- Peeters, Bonaventura (Antwerp, 1614 – Antwerp, 1652), 2 works
- Peeters, Gillis (Antwerp, 1612 – Antwerp, 1653), 1 work
- Peschier, N.L. (died 1660), 1 work
- Picolet, Cornelis (Rotterdam, 1626 – Rotterdam, 1679), 1 work
- Piemont, Nicolaes (Amsterdam, 1644 – Vollenhove, 1709), 3 works
- Pijnacker, Adam (Schiedam, 1622 – Amsterdam, 1673), 6 works
- Plas, David van der (Amsterdam, 1647 – Amsterdam, 1704), 3 works
- Ploy, Willem Jansz. (Delft, 1655 – Delft, 1675), 2 works
- Pluym, Karel van der (Leiden, 1625 – Leiden, 1672), 1 work
- Poel, Egbert Lievensz. van der (Delft, 1621 – Rotterdam, 1664), 2 works
- Poorter, Willem de (Haarlem, 1608 – Heusden, 1649), 1 work
- Post, Frans Jansz. (Leiden, 1612 – Haarlem, 1680), 7 works
- Potter, Paulus (Enkhuizen, 1625 – Amsterdam, 1654), 7 works
- Putter, Pieter de (1605–1659), 1 work
- Puytlinck, Christoffel (Roermond, 1640 – Roermond, 1680), 1 work
- Quast, Pieter Jansz. (Amsterdam, 1606 – Amsterdam, 1647), 3 works
- Quinkhard, Jan Maurits (Rees, 1688 – Amsterdam, 1772), 17 works
- Reuter, Willem (Brussels, 1642 – Rome, 1681), 1 work
- Rietschoof, Jan Claesz. (Hoorn, 1651 – Hoorn, 1719), 2 works
- Rijckaert, David (Antwerp, 1612 – Antwerp, 1661), 2 works
- Rijn, Rembrandt van (Leiden, 1606 – Amsterdam, 1669), 25 works
- Rijsbrack, Pieter Andreas (Paris, 1685 – London, 1748), 1 work
- Ring, Pieter de (Ypres, 1615 – Leiden, 1660), 1 work
- Rocquette, Johan de la (1638–1694), 1 work
- Roepel, Coenraet (The Hague, 1678 – The Hague, 1748), 2 works
- Roestraeten, Pieter Gerritsz. van (Haarlem, 1630 – London, 1700), 1 work
- Roghman, Roelant (Amsterdam, 1627 – Amsterdam, 1692), 3 works
- Romeyn, Willem (Haarlem, 1624 – Haarlem, 1693), 3 works
- Roosendael, Nicolaas (Hoorn, 1634 – Amsterdam, 1686), 1 work
- Rossum, Jan van (Vianen, 1630 – Vianen, 1678), 2 works
- Rotius, Jan Albertsz. (Medemblik, 1624 – Hoorn, 1666), 2 works
- Ruisdael, Jacob Isaacksz. van (Haarlem, 1628 – Haarlem, 1682), 8 works
- Ruysch, Rachel (The Hague, 1664 – Amsterdam, 1750), 2 works
- Ruysdael, Jacob Salomonsz. van (Haarlem, 1629 – Haarlem, 1681), 1 work
- Ruysdael, Salomon van (Naarden, 1602 – Haarlem, 1670), 4 works
- Saftleven, Cornelis (Gorinchem, 1607 – Rotterdam, 1681), 4 works
- Saftleven, Herman (Rotterdam, 1609 – Utrecht, 1685), 4 works
- Sam, Engel (Rotterdam, 1699 – Amsterdam, 1769), 1 work
- Sanders, Hercules (1606–1683), 1 work
- Sandrart, Joachim von (Frankfurt, 1606 – Nuremberg, 1688), 3 works
- Sant-Acker, Frans (Den Bosch, 1648 – Den Bosch, 1688), 1 work
- Santen, Gerrit van (1609–1687), 1 work
- Santvoort, Dirck Dircksz. van (Amsterdam, 1610 – Amsterdam, 1680), 8 works
- Schaak, B. (1650–1699), 1 work
- Schalcken, Godfried (Made, 1643 – The Hague, 1706), 7 works
- Schellinks, Willem (Amsterdam, 1627 – Amsterdam, 1678), 1 work
- Schey, Philip (1626–1626), 1 work
- Schoor, Aelbert Jansz van der (Utrecht, 1603 – Utrecht, 1692), 1 work
- Schurman, Anna Maria van (Cologne, 1607 – Friesland, 1678), 1 work
- Schuylenburgh, Hendrik van (Middelburg, 1620 – Middelburg, 1689), 1 work
- Slingelandt, Pieter Cornelisz. van (Leiden, 1640 – Leiden, 1691), 2 works
- Sorgh, Hendrick Martensz. (Rotterdam, 1610 – Rotterdam, 1670), 5 works
- Spilberg, Johannes (Düsseldorf, 1619 – Düsseldorf, 1690), 2 works
- Staveren, Jan Adriaenszoon van (Leiden, 1614 – Leiden, 1669), 1 work
- Steen, Jan Havicksz. (Leiden, 1626 – Leiden, 1679), 27 works
- Steenwijck, Harmen (Delft, 1612 – Leiden, 1656), 1 work
- Stom, Matthias (Amersfoort, 1600 – Sicily, 1650), 2 works
- Stoop, Dirk (Utrecht, 1615 – Utrecht, 1686), 2 works
- Stoop, Maerten (1610–1647), 1 work
- Storck, Abraham (Amsterdam, 1644 – Amsterdam, 1708), 5 works
- Storck, Jacobus (Amsterdam, 1641 – Amsterdam, 1700), 1 work
- Swaerdecroon, Bernardus (1607–1654), 2 works
- Swanenburgh, Willem van (Leiden, 1610 – Leiden, 1674), 2 works
- Swanevelt, Herman van (Woerden, 1604 – Paris, 1655), 1 work
- Sweerts, Michael (Brussels, 1618 – Goa, 1664), 8 works
- Tempel, Abraham van den (Leeuwarden, 1622 – Amsterdam, 1672), 4 works
- Teniers, David (Antwerp, 1610 – Brussels, 1690), 3 works
- Thielen, Jan Philip van (Antwerp, 1618 – Antwerp, 1667), 1 work
- Thivart, Daniel (Amsterdam, 1611 – Amsterdam, 1656), 1 work
- Tol, Domenicus van (Bodegraven, 1635 – Leiden, 1676), 2 works
- Toorenvliet, Jacob (Leiden, 1640 – Leiden, 1719), 2 works
- Treck, Jan Janszoon (Amsterdam, 1605 – Amsterdam, 1652), 1 work
- Troost, Cornelis (Amsterdam, 1697 – Amsterdam, 1750), 36 works
- Tuer, Herbert (1600–1685), 2 works
- Ulft, Jacob van der (Gorinchem, 1627 – Noordwijk, 1690), 3 works
- Vaillant, Bernard (Lille, 1632 – Leiden, 1698), 2 works
- Vaillant, Wallerant (Lille, 1623 – Amsterdam, 1677), 10 works
- Valk, Hendrick (Leeuwarden, 1674 – Leeuwarden, 1714), 2 works
- Valkenburg, Dirk (Amsterdam, 1675 – Amsterdam, 1721), 1 work
- Velde, Adriaen van de (Amsterdam, 1636 – Amsterdam, 1672), 14 works
- Velde, Jan van de (Haarlem, 1620 – Enkhuizen, 1662), 3 works
- Velde, Peter van de (Antwerp, 1634 – Antwerp, 1723), 1 work
- Velde, Willem van de (Leiden, 1633 – London, 1707), 16 works
- Verelst, Herman (The Hague or Dordrecht, 1641 – London, 1702), 4 works
- Verkolje, Jan (Amsterdam, 1650 – Delft, 1693), 6 works
- Verkolje, Nicolaas (Delft, 1673 – Amsterdam, 1746), 2 works
- Vermeer, Johannes (Delft, 1632 – Delft, 1675), 4 works
- Verschuier, Lieve Pieterszoon (Rotterdam, 1627 – Rotterdam, 1686), 3 works
- Vertangen, Daniel (Amsterdam, 1600 – Amsterdam, 1682), 2 works
- Verwilt, François (Rotterdam, 1623 – Rotterdam, 1691), 1 work
- Vianen, Paulus van (Prague, 1608 – Utrecht, 1652), 1 work
- Victors, Jacomo (Amsterdam, 1640 – Amsterdam, 1705), 1 work
- Victors, Jan (Amsterdam, 1619 – Indonesia, 1676), 3 works
- Vlieger, Simon de (Rotterdam, 1600 – Weesp, 1653), 4 works
- Vliet, Hendrick Cornelisz. van (Delft, 1611 – Delft, 1675), 2 works
- Voet, Jacob-Ferdinand (Antwerp, 1639 – Paris, 1689), 1 work
- Vois, Ary de (Utrecht, 1641 – Leiden, 1680), 7 works
- Vollevens, Johannes (Geertruidenberg, 1649 – The Hague, 1728), 2 works
- Vollevens, Johannes (The Hague, 1685 – The Hague, 1759), 1 work
- Vonck, Elias (Amsterdam, 1605 – Amsterdam, 1652), 1 work
- Vonck, Jan (Toruń, Poland, 1631 – Amsterdam, 1664), 1 work
- Vrel, Jacob (Delft, 1654 – Haarlem, 1662), 1 work
- Vries, Jochem de (Sneek, 1600 – Delft, 1670), 1 work
- Vries, Roelof Jansz. van (Haarlem, 1630 – Amsterdam, 1690), 1 work
- Vromans, Isac (Delft, 1658 – Den Bosch, 1706), 1 work
- Vucht, Gerrit van (Schiedam, 1610 – Schiedam, 1697), 1 work
- Walraven, Isaac (Amsterdam, 1686 – Amsterdam, 1765), 1 work
- Walscapelle, Jacob van (Dordrecht, 1644 – Amsterdam, 1727), 1 work
- Wassenberg, Jan Abel (Groningen, 1689 – Groningen, 1750), 3 works
- Waterloo, Anthonie (Lille, 1609 – Utrecht, 1690), 1 work
- Weenix, Jan (Amsterdam, 1640 – Amsterdam, 1719), 3 works
- Weenix, Jan Baptist (Amsterdam, 1621 – Utrecht, 1661), 4 works
- Werff, Adriaen van der (Kralingen, 1659 – Rotterdam, 1722), 6 works
- Werff, Pieter van der (Kralingen, 1665 – Rotterdam, 1722), 2 works
- Westerbaen, Jan Jansz. (I) (1600–1686), 1 work
- Westerveld, Abraham Evertsz. van (1620 – Rotterdam, 1692), 1 work
- Wet, Gerrit de (Haarlem, 1620 – Leiden, 1674), 1 work
- Wet, Jacob de (Haarlem, 1610 – Haarlem, 1675), 1 work
- Wieringa, Nicolaas (1624–1681), 1 work
- Wijck, Thomas (Beverwijk, 1616 – Haarlem, 1677), 3 works
- Wijckersloot, Johannes van (Utrecht, 1630 – Amsterdam, 1687), 1 work
- Wijnants, Jan (Haarlem, 1632 – Amsterdam, 1684), 7 works
- Wijnen, Domenicus van (Amsterdam, 1661–1695), 1 work
- Wijntrack, Dirck (Heusden, 1615 – The Hague, 1678), 1 work
- Willeboirts Bosschaert, Thomas (Bergen op Zoom, 1613 – Antwerp, 1654), 2 works
- Windtraken, J.W. (1680–1720), 2 works
- Wit, Jacob de (Amsterdam, 1695 – Amsterdam, 1754), 2 works
- Witte, Peter de (Antwerp, 1617 – Antwerp, 1667), 2 works
- Withoos, Matthias (Amersfoort, 1627 – Hoorn, 1703), 1 work
- Witte, Emanuel de (Alkmaar, 1617 – Amsterdam, 1692), 3 works
- Wolters, Herman (Zwolle, 1682 – Haarlem, 1766), 1 work
- Woutersin, L.J. (1610–1650), 1 work
- Wouwerman, Jan (Haarlem, 1629 – Haarlem, 1666), 1 work
- Wouwerman, Philips (Haarlem, 1619 – Haarlem, 1668), 15 works
- Wouwerman, Pieter (Haarlem, 1623 – Amsterdam, 1682), 2 works
- Wulfraet, Mathijs (Arnhem, 1648 – Amsterdam, 1727), 1 work
- Zijl, Gerard Pietersz. van (Haarlem, 1609 – Amsterdam, 1665), 1 work
- Zijl, Roeloff (c.1600 – Utrecht, 1630), 1 work

== Born in the 18th century ==
- Alberti, Jean-Eugène-Charles (Maastricht, 1777–1843), 3 works
- Andriessen, Jurriaan (Amsterdam, 1742 – Amsterdam, 1819), 1 work
- Apostool, Cornelis (Amsterdam, 1762 – Amsterdam, 1844), 1 work
- Appelius, Jean (died Middelburg, 1790), 1 work
- Assche, Henri van (Brussels, 1774 – Brussels, 1841), 1 work
- Augustini, Jacobus Luberti (Haarlem, 1748 – Haarlem, 1822), 1 work
- Backhuijzen, Gerrit (Amsterdam, 1721 – Rotterdam, 1760), 1 work
- Baur, Nicolaas (Harlingen, 1767 – Harlingen, 1820), 4 works
- Behr, Johann Philipp (Augsburg, 1720 – Frankfurt, 1756), 2 works
- Bolomey, Benjamin Samuel (Lausanne, 1739 – Lausanne, 1819), 5 works
- Brandt, Albertus Jonas (Amsterdam, 1788 – Amsterdam, 1821), 2 works
- Brassauw, Melchior (Mechelen, 1709 – Antwerp, 1757), 1 work
- Bree, Matheus Ignatius van (Antwerp, 1773 – Antwerp, 1839), 6 works
- Breuhaus de Groot, Frans Arnold (1796–1875), 1 work
- Brondgeest, Albertus (Amsterdam, 1786 – Amsterdam, 1849), 1 work
- Burgh, Hendrick van der (Amsterdam, 1769–1858), 1 work
- Buys, Jacobus (Amsterdam, 1724 – Amsterdam, 1801), 4 works
- Coclers, Louis Bernard (Liège, 1770 – Liège, 1827), 3 works
- Compe, Jan ten (Amsterdam, 1713 – Amsterdam, 1761), 1 work
- Cuylenburgh, Cornelis van (Utrecht, 1758 – The Hague, 1827), 5 works
- Daiwaille, Jean Augustin (Cologne, 1786 – Rotterdam, 1850), 3 works
- Dasveldt, Jan (1770–1855), 2 works
- Demarne, Jean-Louis (Brussels, 1752 – Paris, 1829), 1 work
- Dreibholtz, Christiaan Lodewijk Willem (Utrecht, 1799 – Utrecht, 1874), 2 works
- Drielst, Egbert (Groningen, 1745 – Amsterdam, 1818), 2 works
- Dubois-Drahonet, Alexandre Jean (Paris, 1791 – Paris, 1834), 2 works
- Ducorron, Julien Joseph (Ath, 1770 – Ath, 1848), 1 work
- Dumesnil, Louis Michel (died Paris, 1739), 1 work
- Eeckhout, Jacobus Josephus (Antwerp, 1793 – Paris, 1861), 2 works
- Eelkema, Eelke Jelles (Leeuwarden, 1788 – Leeuwarden, 1839), 5 works
- Ekels, Jan (Amsterdam, 1724 – Amsterdam, 1780), 2 works
- Ekels, Jan II (Amsterdam, 1759 – Amsterdam, 1793), 3 works
- Fargue van Nieuwland, Isaac Lodewijk la (1726–1805), 2 works
- Fargue, Paulus Constantijn la (The Hague, 1728 – The Hague, 1782), 2 works
- Favray, Antoine de (Bagnolet, 1706 – Malta, 1792), 1 work
- Fournier, Jean (1703–1754), 2 works
- Franck, Christoffel Frederik (Zwolle, 1758 – Bennebroek, 1816), 1 work
- Geelen, Christiaan van (I) (Utrecht, 1755 – Utrecht, 1824), 2 works
- Gérard, François (Rome, 1770 – Paris, 1837), 2 works
- Haag, Tethart Philipp Christian (Kassel, 1737 – The Hague, 1812), 1 work
- Hauck, August Christian (Mannheim, 1742 – Rotterdam, 1801), 2 works
- Hendriks, Wybrand (Amsterdam, 1744 – Haarlem, 1831), 9 works
- Hodges, Charles Howard (Portsmouth, 1764 – Amsterdam, 1837), 18 works
- Hoopstad, Elisabeth Iosetta (Guyana, 1787 – Marseille, 1847), 1 work
- Horemans, Jan Jozef II (Antwerp, 1714 – Antwerp, after 1790), 1 work
- Horstok, Johannes Petrus van (Haarlem, 1745 – Haarlem, 1825), 1 work
- Hove, Bartholomeus Johannes van (The Hague, 1790 – The Hague, 1880), 2 works
- Hulswit, Jan (Amsterdam, 1766 – Amstelveen, 1822), 2 works
- Humbert de Superville, David Pièrre Giottino (The Hague, 1770 – Leiden, 1849), 1 work
- Humbert, Jean (Amsterdam, 1734 – Amstelveen, 1794), 1 work
- Janson, Johannes (Ambon, Dutch East Indies, 1729 – Leiden, 1784), 1 work
- Janson, Johannes Christiaan (Leiden, 1763 – The Hague, 1823), 2 works
- Jelgerhuis, Johannes (Leeuwarden, 1770 – Amsterdam, 1836), 9 works
- Kaldenbach, Johan Antoni (Zutphen, 1760 – Zutphen, 1818), 1 work
- Kamphuijsen, Jan (Amsterdam, 1760 – Amsterdam, 1841), 1 work
- Keun, Hendrik (Haarlem, 1738 – Haarlem, 1787), 3 works
- Kieft, Jan (De Rijp, 1798 – Amsterdam, 1870), 1 work
- Kleijn, Pieter Rudolph (Hooge Zwaluwe, 1785–1816), 3 works
- Knip, Josephus Augustus (Tilburg, 1777 – Berlicum, 1847), 5 works
- Knoll, François Cornelis (Rotterdam, 1772 – Utrecht, 1827), 1 work
- Kobell, Hendrik (Rotterdam, 1751 – Rotterdam, 1779), 1 work
- Kobell, Jan (Delfshaven, 1778 – Amsterdam, 1814), 3 works
- Kooi, Willem Bartel van der (Augustinusga, 1768 – Leeuwarden, 1836), 5 works
- Kruseman, Cornelis (Amsterdam, 1797 – Lisse, 1857), 15 works
- Kuster, Conrad (Winterthur, 1730 – 1802), 2 works
- Laan, Dirk Jan van der (Zwolle, 1759 – Zwolle, 1829), 1 work
- Laquy, Willem Joseph (1738–1798), 3 works
- Lauwers, Jacobus Johannes (Bruges, 1753 – Amsterdam, 1800), 1 work
- Lelie, Adriaan de (Tilburg, 1755 – Amsterdam, 1820), 20 works
- Liotard, Étienne (Geneve, 1702 – Geneve, 1789), 1 work
- Loeff, Hillebrand Dirk (The Hague, 1774 – The Hague, 1845), 1 work
- May, Jan Willem (Amsterdam, 1798 – Hoorn, 1826), 2 works
- Meulemans, Adriaan (Dordrecht, 1763 – The Hague, 1835), 2 works
- Michaëlis, Gerrit Jan (Amsterdam, 1775 – Haarlem, 1857), 1 work
- Mijn, Cornelia van der (Amsterdam, 1709 – London, 1782), 1 work
- Mijn, Frans van der (Düsseldorf, 1719 – London, 1783), 7 works
- Mijn, George van der (London, 1723 – Amsterdam, 1763), 3 works
- Mol, Woutherus (Haarlem, 1785 – Haarlem, 1857), 1 work
- Morel, Jan Evert (Amsterdam, 1769 – Amsterdam, 1808), 2 works
- Moritz, Louis (The Hague, 1773 – Amsterdam, 1850), 11 works
- Muys, Nicolaes (Rotterdam, 1740 – Rotterdam, 1808), 1 work
- Nachenius, Jan Jacob (1709–1750), 1 work
- Nijmegen, Dionys (Rotterdam, 1705 – Rotterdam, 1798), 6 works
- Nijmegen, Gerard van (Rotterdam, 1735 – Rotterdam, 1808), 1 work
- Numan, Hermanus (1744–1820), 1 work
- Oberman, Anthony (Amsterdam, 1781 – Amsterdam, 1845), 3 works
- Oets, Pieter (Amsterdam, 1735 – Amsterdam, 1780), 1 work
- Oliphant, Jacobus (1715 – Leiden, 1742), 1 work
- Os, Georgius van (The Hague, 1782 – Paris, 1861), 3 works
- Os, Jan van (Middelharnis, 1744 – The Hague, 1808), 1 work
- Os, Maria Margaretha van (Middelharnis, 1779 – The Hague, 1862), 1 work
- Os, Pieter Gerardus van (The Hague, 1776 – The Hague, 1839), 10 works
- Ouwater, Isaac (Amsterdam, 1748 – Amsterdam, 1793), 3 works
- Palthe, Jan (Deventer, 1717 – Leiden, 1769), 1 work
- Perronneau, Jean-Baptiste (Paris, 1715 – Amsterdam, 1783), 2 works
- Pieneman, Jan Willem (Abcoude, 1779 – Amsterdam, 1853), 18 works
- Pitloo, Antonie Sminck (Arnhem, 1790 – Naples, 1837), 1 work
- Pothoven, Hendrik (Amsterdam, 1725 – Amsterdam, 1807), 2 works
- Prins, Johannes Huibert (The Hague, 1757 – Utrecht, 1806), 1 work
- Prud'Hon, Pierre-Paul (Cluny, 1758 – Paris, 1823), 1 work
- Quinkhard, Julius Henricus (Amsterdam, 1734 – Amsterdam, 1795), 2 works
- Ravenswaay, Jan van (Hilversum, 1789 – Hilversum, 1869), 1 work
- Regters, Tibout (Dordrecht, 1710 – Amsterdam, 1768), 13 works
- Reyers, Nicolaas (Leiden, 1719 – Leiden, 1784), 1 work
- Rheen, Theodorus Justinus (Amsterdam, 0 – Batavia, 1745), 1 work
- Rode, Niels (Guldborgsund, 1732 – Copenhagen, 1794), 1 work
- Sander Bakhuyzen, Hendrik van de (The Hague, 1795 – The Hague, 1860), 5 works
- Sande Bakhuyzen, Julius Jacobus van de (The Hague, 1795 – The Hague, 1860), 3 works
- Scheffer, Johann Baptist (Cassel, 1773 – Amsterdam, 1809), 2 works
- Schelfhout, Andreas (The Hague, 1787 – The Hague, 1870), 2 works
- Schmidt, George Adam (1791–1844), 1 work
- Schoemaker Doyer, Jacobus (Crefeld, 1792 – Zutphen, 1867), 1 work
- Schoenmakers, Johannes (1755–1842), 1 work
- Schotel, Johannes Christiaan (Dordrecht, 1787 – Dordrecht, 1838), 2 works
- Schouman, Aart (Dordrecht, 1710 – The Hague, 1792), 3 works
- Schouman M, rtinus (Dordrecht, 1770 – Breda, 1848), 4 works
- Schweickhardt, Hendrik Willem (North Rhine Westphalia, 1747 – London, 1797), 1 work
- Spilman, Hendrik (Amsterdam, 1721 – Haarlem, 1784), 1 work
- Spinny, Guillaume de (Brussels, 1721 – The Hague, 1785), 2 works
- Stolker, Jan (Amsterdam, 1724 – Rotterdam, 1785), 1 work
- Strij, Abraham van (Dordrecht, 1753 – Dordrecht, 1826), 4 works
- Strij, Jacob van (Dordrecht, 1756 – Dordrecht, 1815), 5 works
- Sypesteyn, Maria Machteld (Haarlem, 1724 – Heemstede, 1774), 1 work
- Teerlink, Abraham (Dordrecht, 1776 – Rome, 1857), 2 works
- Tischbein, Johann Friedrich August (Maastricht, 1750 – Heidelberg, 1812), 7 works
- Troostwijk, Wouter Johannes van (Amsterdam, 1782 – Amsterdam, 1810), 4 works
- Uppink, Harmanus (Amsterdam, 1765 – Amsterdam, 1791), 1 work
- Uppink, Willem (Amsterdam, 1767 – Amsterdam, 1849), 2 works
- Valois, Jean François (Paramaribo, 1778 – The Hague, 1853), 2 works
- Hulst, Jan Baptist van der (Leuven, 1790 – Brussels, 1862), 3 works
- Verboeckhoven, Eugène-Joseph (Warneton, 1798 – Brussels, 1881), 1 work
- Verheyden, Mattheus (Breda, 1700 – The Hague, 1776), 9 works
- Versteegh, Michiel (1756–1843), 3 works
- Vianey, Joseph Pierre (Nantes, 1731 – Middelburg, 1765), 1 work
- Voogd, Hendrik (Amsterdam, 1768 – Rome, 1839), 1 work
- Wassenberg, Elisabeth Geertruida (Groningen, 1729 – Groningen, 1781), 1 work
- Westenberg, George Pieter (Nijmegen, 1791 – Brummen, 1873), 1 work
- Wierix, Henricus Franciscus (Amsterdam, 1784 – Nijmegen, 1858), 1 work
- Wolff, Benjamin (Dessau, 1758 – Amsterdam, 1825), 1 work

== Born in the 19th century ==
- Abels, Jacobus Theodorus (Amsterdam, 1803 – Abcoude, 1866), 1 work
- Allebé, August (Amsterdam, 1838 – Amsterdam, 1937), 8 works
- Alma-Tadema, Lawrence (Dronrijp, 1836 – Wiesbaden, 1912), 3 works
- Alma-Tadema, Laura (London), 1852 – Hindhead, 1909), 1 work
- Altmann, Sybrand (Texel, 1822 – Amsterdam, 1890), 1 work
- Apol, Louis (The Hague, 1850 – The Hague, 1936), 2 works
- Artz, Adolph (The Hague, 1837 – The Hague, 1890), 3 works
- Assendelft, Cornelis Albert van (Middelburg, 1870 – Amsterdam, 1945), 1 work
- Bakker Korff, Alexander Hugo (The Hague, 1824 – Leiden, 1882), 4 works
- Bashkirtseff, Marie-Konstantinowna (Poltava, 1860 – Paris, 1884), 1 work
- Bastert, Nicolaas (Maarssen, 1854 – Loenen aan de Vecht, 1939), 1 work
- Baur, Marius (The Hague, 1867 – Amsterdam, 1932), 10 works
- Beek, Bernard van (Amsterdam, 1875 – Kortenhoef, 1941), 1 work
- Behr, Carel Jacobus (The Hague, 1812 – The Hague, 1895), 1 work
- Berg, Andries van den (The Hague, 1852 – The Hague, 1944), 3 works
- Berg, Simon van den (Rotterdam, 1812 – Arnhem, 1891), 1 work
- Berg, Willem van den (Amsterdam, 1886 – The Hague, 1970), 1 work
- Beveren, Charles van (Mechelen, 1809 – Amsterdam, 1850), 3 works
- Bilders, Gerard (Utrecht, 1838 – The Hague, 1865), 8 works
- Bilders, Johannes Warnardus (Utrecht, 1811 – Oosterbeek, 1890), 2 works
- Bilders-van Bosse, Marie (1837–1900), 1 work
- Bisschop, Christoffel (Leeuwarden, 1828 – Scheveningen, 1904), 2 works
- Bisschop-Swift, Kate (London, 1834 – The Hague, 1928), 1 work
- Blaaderen, Gerrit Willem van (Amsterdam, 1873 – Bergen, 1935), 1 work
- Bles, David (The Hague, 1821 – The Hague, 1899), 1 work
- Bloeme, Herman Antonie de (The Hague, 1802 – The Hague, 1867), 1 work
- Blommers, Bernardus Johannes (The Hague, 1845 – The Hague, 1914), 4 works
- Bock, Théophile de (The Hague, 1851 – Haarlem, 1904), 6 works
- Bombled, Karel Frederik (Amsterdam, 1822 – Chantilly, 1902), 1 work
- Bonvin, François (Paris, 1817 – Saint-Germain-en-Laye, 1887), 1 work
- Borselen, Jan Willem van (Gouda, 1825 – The Hague, 1892), 1 work
- Bosboom, Johannes (The Hague, 1817 – The Hague, 1891), 2 works
- Boulard, Auguste (1825–1897), 1 work
- Breitner, George Hendrik (Rotterdam, 1857 – Amsterdam, 1923), 50 works
- Brugghen, Guillaume Anne van der (Nijmegen, 1811 – Ubbergen, 1891), 4 works
- Burgers, Hendricus Jacobus (1834–1899), 1 work
- Burgh, Pieter Daniel van der (The Hague, 1805 – Rijswijk, 1879), 1 work
- Calisch, Moritz (Amsterdam, 1819 – Amsterdam, 1870), 4 works
- Cate, Siebe Johannes ten (Sneek, 1858 – Paris, 1908), 1 work
- Cornet, Jacobus Ludovicus (Leiden, 1815 – Leiden, 1882), 1 work
- Couwenberg, Henricus Wilhelmus (The Hague, 1814 – Amsterdam, 1845), 2 works
- Craeyvanger, Gijsbertus (Utrecht, 1810 – Utrecht, 1895), 1 work
- Cunaeus, Conradijn (1828–1895), 2 works
- Daiwaille, Alexander Joseph (Amsterdam, 1818 – Brussels, 1888), 1 work
- Dankmeijer, Charles (Amsterdam, 1861 – Scheveningen, 1923), 2 works
- Derkinderen, Antoon (Den Bosch, 1859 – Amsterdam, 1925), 1 work
- Derksen, Gijsbertus (Doesburg, 1870 – Arnhem, 1920), 1 work
- Deutmann, Franz (Zwolle, 1867 – Blaricum, 1915), 1 work
- Deventer, Willem Anthonie van (The Hague, 1824 – The Hague, 1893), 2 works
- Dijsselhof, Gerrit Willem (1866 – Overveen, 1924), 1 work
- Drift, Johannes Adrianus van der (The Hague, 1808 – Weert, 1883), 1 work
- Dubourcq, Pierre Louis (Amsterdam, 1815 – Amsterdam, 1873), 1 work
- Eerelman, Otto (Groningen, 1839 – Groningen, 1926), 1 work
- Engelberts, Willem Jodocus Mattheus (Amsterdam, 1809 – Waalre, 1887), 1 work
- Famars Testas, Willem de (Utrecht, 1834 – Arnhem, 1896), 1 work
- Gabriël, Paul Joseph Constantin (Amsterdam, 1828 – Scheveningen, 1903), 5 works
- Greive, Johan Conrad (Amsterdam, 1837 – Amsterdam, 1891), 1 work
- Gruyter, Willem (jr.) (1817–1880), 1 work
- Haanen, Adriana (Oosterhout, 1814 – Oosterbeek, 1895), 2 works
- Haanen, George Gillis (Utrecht, 1807 – Bilsen, 1879), 1 work
- Haanen, Remigius Adrianus (Oosterhout, 1812 – Bad Aussee, 1894), 1 work
- Haas, Johannes Hubertus Leonardus de (Hedel, 1832 – Königswinter, 1908), 1 work
- Hendoes, Louwrens (Woudrichem, 1822 – Woudrichem, 1905), 7 works
- Hari, Johannes (The Hague, 1807 – The Hague, 1887), 1 work
- Heemskerck van Beest, Jacob Eduard van (Kampen, 1828 – The Hague, 1894), 2 works
- Heijl, Marinus (Utrecht, 1836 – Amsterdam, 1931), 1 work
- Hem, Piet van der (1885–1961), 1 work
- Hendriks, Frederik Hendrik (Arnhem, 1808 – Arnhem, 1865), 1 work
- Hendriks, Sara (Renkum, 1846 – Naarden, 1925), 1 work
- Hollander, Hendrik (Leeuwarden, 1823 – Amsterdam, 1884), 1 work
- Hoppenbrouwers, Johannes Franciscus (The Hague, 1819 – The Hague, 1866), 2 works
- Horst, J. van (1821–1874), 9 works
- Hoynck van Papendrecht, Jan van (Amsterdam, 1858 – The Hague, 1933), 1 work
- Hoytema, Theo van (The Hague, 1863 – The Hague, 1917), 1 work
- Hubrecht, Bramine (1855–1913), 2 works
- Israëls, Isaac (Amsterdam, 1865 – The Hague, 1934), 13 works
- Israels, Jozef (Groningen, 1824 – Scheveningen, 1911), 12 works
- Jamin, Diederik Franciscus (1838–1865), 1 work
- Japy, Louis Aimé (Doubs, 1840 – Paris, 1916), 1 work
- Jolly, Henri Jean Baptiste (Antwerp, 1812 – Amsterdam, 1853), 1 work
- Jong, Jurjen de (Harlingen, 1807 – Harlingen, 1890), 1 work
- Jongkind, Johan Barthold (Lattrop, 1819 – La Côte-Saint-André, 1891), 2 works
- Josselin de Jong, Pieter de (1861–1906), 1 work
- Karsen, Eduard (Amsterdam, 1860 – Amsterdam, 1941), 12 works
- Karsen, Kasparus (Amsterdam, 1810 – Bieberich, 1896), 4 works
- Kate, Herman ten (The Hague, 1822 – The Hague, 1894), 2 works
- Kever, Hein (Amsterdam, 1854 – Laren, 1922), 4 works
- Klombeck, Johann Bernard (Cleve, 1815 – Cleve, 1893), 1 work
- Koekkoek, Barend Cornelis (Middelburg, 1803 – Cleve, 1862), 2 works
- Kruseman, Jan Adam (Haarlem, 1804 – Haarlem, 1862), 9 works
- Leickert, Charles Henri Joseph (Brussels, 1816 – Mainz, 1907), 2 works
- Liernur, Willem Adriaan Alexander (The Hague, 1856 – Deventer, 1917), 1 work
- Loebell, Mina (Vienna, 1890 – Dutch East Indies, 1921), 1 work
- Lokhorst, Dirk van (Utrecht, 1818 – Utrecht, 1893), 1 work
- Looy, Jac. van (Haarlem, 1855 – Haarlem, 1930), 2 works
- Marinus van der Maarel (The Hague, 1857 – The Hague, 1921), 4 works
- Mankes, Jan (Meppel, 1889 – Eerbeek, 1920), 1 work
- Maris, Jacob (The Hague, 1837 – Karlsbad, 1899), 28 works
- Maris, Matthijs (The Hague, 1839 – London, 1917), 8 works
- Maris, Willem (The Hague, 1844 – The Hague, 1910), 3 works
- Maschaupt, Jan Hendrik (1826–1903), 2 works
- Mauve, Anton (Zaandam, 1838 – Arnhem, 1888), 14 works
- Meijer, Louis (Amsterdam, 1809 – Utrecht, 1866), 3 works
- Mesdag, Hendrik Willem (Groningen, 1831 – The Hague, 1915), 7 works
- Mesdag-van Houten, Sientje (Groningen, 1834 – The Hague, 1909), 1 work
- Meulen, François Pieter ter (Bodegraven, 1843 – The Hague, 1927), 2 works
- Monet, Claude (Paris, 1840 – Giverny, 1926), 1 work
- Monnickendam, Martin (1874–1943), 1 work
- Neuhuys, Albert (Utrecht, 1844 – Locarno, 1914), 2 works
- Neuhuys, Jozef (Utrecht, 1841 – Warmond, 1889), 1 work
- Neuman, Johan Heinrich (Cologne, 1819 – The Hague, 1898), 8 works
- Nuijen, Wijnandus Johannes Josephus (The Hague, 1813 – The Hague, 1839), 2 works
- Oosterzee, Hermannus Adrianus van (1863–1933), 1 work
- Oppenoorth, Willem (1847–1905), 1 work
- Opzoomer, Simon (Rotterdam, 1819 – Antwerp, 1878), 1 work
- Os, Pieter Frederik van (Amsterdam, 1808 – Haarlem, 1892), 1 work
- Philippeau, Carel Frans (1825–1897), 1 work
- Pieneman, Nicolaas (Amersfoort, 1809 – Amsterdam, 1860), 9 works
- Poggenbeek, Geo (Amsterdam, 1853 – Amsterdam, 1903), 3 works
- Prooijen, Albert Jurardus van (Groningen, 1834 – Amsterdam, 1898), 1 work
- Regteren Altena, Martinus van (1866–1908), 1 work
- Riegen, Nicolaas (Amsterdam, 1827 – Amsterdam, 1889), 1 work
- Rochussen, Charles (Rotterdam, 1814 – Rotterdam, 1894), 6 works
- Roelofs, Willem (Amsterdam, 1822 – Berchem, 1897), 2 works
- Roelofs, Willem (Scharbeek, 1874 – The Hague, 1940), 1 work
- Ronner-Knip, Henriëtte (Amsterdam, 1821 – Ixelles, 1909), 1 work
- Roos, Cornelis François (1802–1884), 1 work
- Roosenboom, Margaretha (Voorburg, 1843 – Voorburg, 1896), 3 works
- Rossum du Chattel, Fredericus Jacobus van (Leiden, 1856 – Yokohama, 1917), 1 work
- Rossum, Jan Cornelis van (Amsterdam, 1820 – Amsterdam, 1905), 1 work
- Roth, George Andries (Amsterdam, 1809 – Amsterdam, 1887), 1 work
- Saleh, Raden Sarief Bastaman (Dutch East Indies, 1811 – Dutch East Indies, 1880), 4 works
- Salm, Ab (Amsterdam, 1801 – Amsterdam, 1876), 1 work
- Sande Bakhuyzen, Gerardina Jacoba van de (1826–1895), 1 work
- Saxen Weimar Eisenbach, Marie Alexandrine van (1886–1886), 1 work
- Schaap, Egbert (1862–1939), 1 work
- Schmidt, Willem Hendrik (Rotterdam, 1809 – Delft, 1849), 1 work
- Scholten, Hendrik Jacobus (Amsterdam, 1824 – Heemstede, 1907), 3 works
- Schotel, Petrus Johannes (Dordrecht, 1808 – Dresden, 1865), 4 works
- Schouman, Izaak (1801–1878), 1 work
- Schwartze, Johann Georg (Düsseldorf, 1814 – Amsterdam, 1874), 4 works
- Schwartze, Thérèse (Amsterdam, 1851 – Amsterdam, 1918), 4 works
- Slager, Piet (Amsterdam, 1841–1912), 2 works
- Sluijters, Jan (Den Bosch, 1881 – Amsterdam, 1957), 1 work
- Sluiter, Willy (Amersfoort, 1873 – The Hague, 1949), 1 work
- Soeren, Gerrit Jacobus van (Amsterdam, 1859 – Amsterdam, 1888), 1 work
- Spoel, Jacob (Rotterdam, 1820 – Rotterdam, 1868), 2 works
- Springer, Cornelis (Amsterdam, 1817 – Hilversum, 1891), 2 works
- Stortenbeker, Pieter (1828–1898), 1 work
- Stroebel, Johannes Anthonie Balthasar (1821–1905), 1 work
- Swan, John Macallan (Brentford, 1847–1910), 1 work
- Szyndler, Pantaleon (Warsaw, 1846 – Warsaw, 1905), 1 work
- Tavenraat, Johannes (Rotterdam, 1809 – Rotterdam, 1881), 1 work
- Teenstra, Kornelis Douwes (Zuidhorn, 1813 – Groningen, 1873), 1 work
- Temminck, Henriëtta Christina (The Hague, 1813 – The Hague, 1886), 1 work
- Tholen, Willem Bastiaan (Amsterdam, 1860 – The Hague, 1931), 1 work
- Tom, Jan Bedijs (Boskoop, 1813 – Leiden, 1894), 1 work
- Toorop, Jan (Katwijk, 1858 – Bergen, 1928), 2 works
- Trigt, Hendrik Albert van (Dordrecht, 1829 – Heiloo, 1899), 1 work
- Velden, Petrus van der (Rotterdam, 1837 – Auckland, 1913), 1 work
- Verschuur, Wouter (Amsterdam, 1812 – Vorden, 1874), 1 work
- Verveer, Salomon (The Hague, 1813 – The Hague, 1876), 3 works
- Veth, Jan (Dordrecht, 1864 – Amsterdam, 1925), 6 works
- Vogel, Cornelis Johannes de (Dordrecht, 1824 – Dordrecht, 1879), 1 work
- Vos, Maria (Amsterdam, 1824 – Oosterbeek, 1906), 2 works
- Waay, Nicolaas van der (Amsterdam, 1855 – Amsterdam, 1936), 2 works
- Waldorp, Anthonie (The Hague, 1803 – Amsterdam, 1866), 3 works
- Weissenbruch, Jan (The Hague, 1822 – The Hague, 1880), 3 works
- Weissenbruch, Jan Hendrik (The Hague, 1824 – The Hague, 1903), 6 works
- Welie, Antoon van (Druten, 1866 – The Hague, 1956), 2 works
- Westerbeek, Cornelis (sr.) (Sassenheim, 1844 – The Hague, 1903), 1 work
- Wever, Cornelis (Amsterdam, 1748 – Amsterdam, 1792), 2 works
- Weyand, Jacob Gerrit (Amsterdam, 1886 – Bakkum, 1960), 1 work
- Wijsmuller, Jan Hillebrand (Amsterdam, 1855 – Amsterdam, 1925), 1 work
- Winter, Abraham Hendrik (Utrecht, 1800 – Amsterdam, 1861), 1 work
- Winterhalter, Franz Xaver (Sankt Blasien, 1805 – Frankfurt, 1873), 1 work
- Witsen W, Willem (Amsterdam, 1860 – Amsterdam, 1923), 6 works
- Zwart, Willem de (The Hague, 1862 – The Hague, 1931), 12 works

== Born in the 20th century ==
- Perlman, Suzanne (Budapest, 1922 – London, 2020), 1 work
- Rol, Henricus (Amsterdam, 1906 – Nieuwkoop, 1992), 1 work
- Schröder, Sierk (Ambon, 1903 – Wassenaar, 2002), 1 work
- Willink, Carel (Amsterdam, 1900 – Amsterdam, 1983), 1 work
