= Japy =

Japy (French pronunciation: [ʒa.pi]) is a French surname. Notable people with this surname include:

- Arthur Japy Hepburn (1877–1964), American admiral
- Camille Japy (born 1968), Belgian-French actress
- Joséphine Japy (born 1994), French actress
- Louis Aimé Japy (1840–1916), French painter
