= Daniel Thivart =

Dutch Golden Age genre painter

Daniel Thivart (1611 in Amsterdam – 1656 in Amsterdam) was a Dutch Golden Age genre painter.

== Biography ==
According to the RKD he was influenced by Leonaert Bramer and Willem de Poorter. He is known for religious scenes and historical allegories such as "Silvio en Dorinda", "Paulus en Barnabus", "Theagenes en Chariclea", and others.
