= Jan Abel Wassenbergh =

Dutch painter

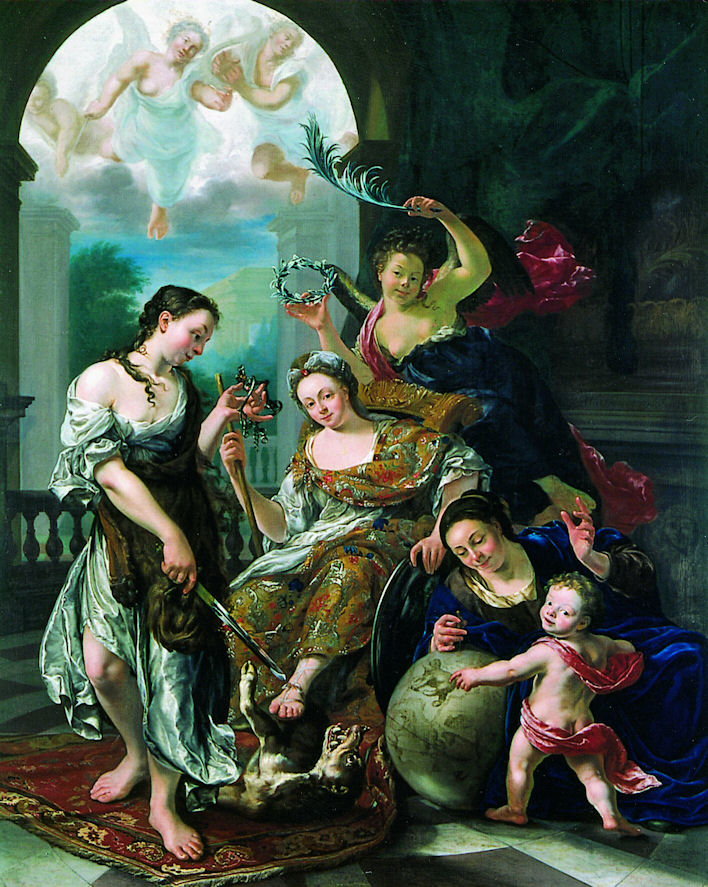
Allegory of good government, 1729, Groninger museum

Jan Abel Wassenbergh (18 January 1689 – ca. 20 July 1750) was an 18th-century painter from the Dutch Republic.

== Biography ==
He was born in Groningen. According to Jan van Gool and the RKD he first studied law and then took drawing lessons from Jan van Dieren (of whom Van Gool had never heard of). Meeting with success, Wassenbergh travelled to Rotterdam in 1712 where he became a pupil of Adriaen van der Werff. He married Johanna van Oijen after returning to Groningen in 1715, and became quite successful as a portraitist, history painter and room decorator (making ceiling, over-the-mantel pieces and doorway decorations for the nobility of the town). Many of his room decorations still survive in their original installations. Their daughter Elisabet Geertruda, and son Jan Jr followed their father, while daughter Gertruida Abelia was good at fruit and flowers.
