= Siebe Johannes ten Cate =

Dutch painter

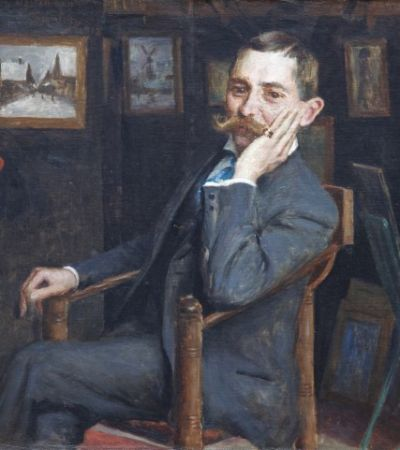
Self-portrait (c.1900)

Siebe Johannes ten Cate (27 February 1858, Sneek – 9 December 1908, Paris) was a Dutch-Frisian painter in the Impressionist style, who spent most of his working life in France.

== Biography ==
His father was Jan ten Cate, a tanner who entered politics and became the Mayor of Sneek. His grandfather, Steven ten Cate also served as Mayor.

He studied at the Rijksakademie and, after graduating, continued his studies in Antwerp and Brussels. At the age of twenty-two, he settled in Paris and opened his own studio. Soon, he found himself influenced by impressionism. He also became a friend of Kees van Dongen and the two briefly shared a home in Montmartre in 1897. Van Gogh was an acquaintance and described Ten Cate as "a very neat man, completely dressed in black cloth", and not at all like a typical poor artist.

He exhibited frequently, notably at the Salon d'Automne, but his works were not as well appreciated in the Netherlands as in France so, although he made numerous visits, he never returned there.

He made frequent trips for inspiration, visiting England, Scandinavia, Switzerland, North Africa and North America. His favorite subjects were landscapes, city and harbor views, often populated with figures. Le Havre was one of his favorite locations. He also made some etchings and lithographs.

He died on a Paris street from a sudden attack of "congestion". Later, there would be unsubstantiated rumors that he died of starvation, or was shot by a rival artist. For many years, his work was neglected in the Netherlands. A major retrospective was held at the Fries Scheepvaart Museum in 2012.

== Selected paintings ==
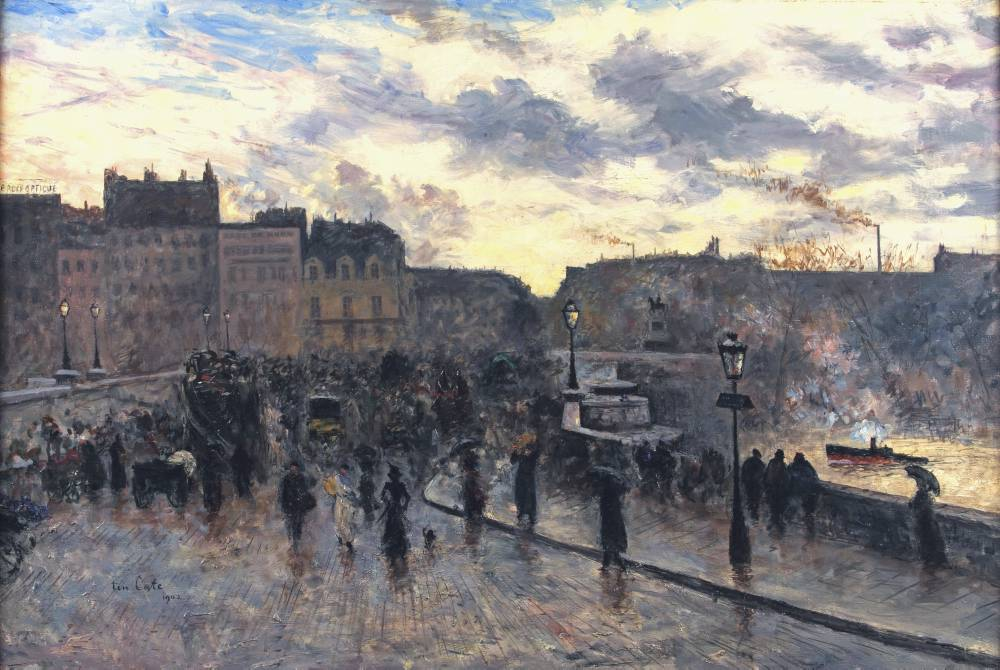
The Pont Neuf

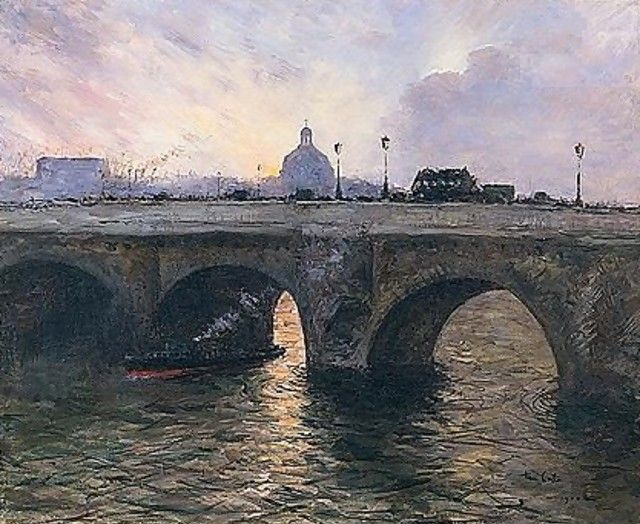
The Pont Royal at Sunset

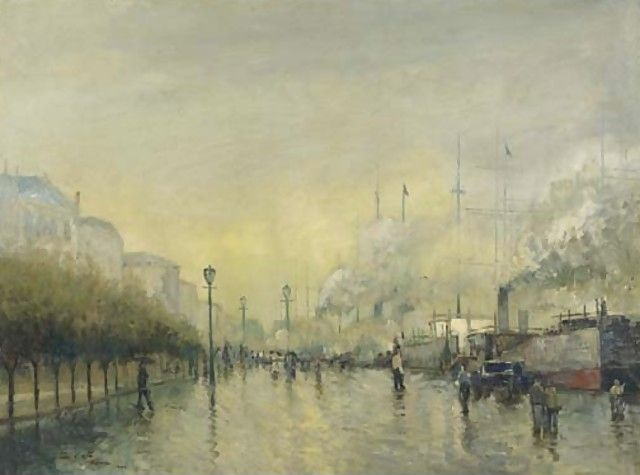
On the Quay at Le Havre

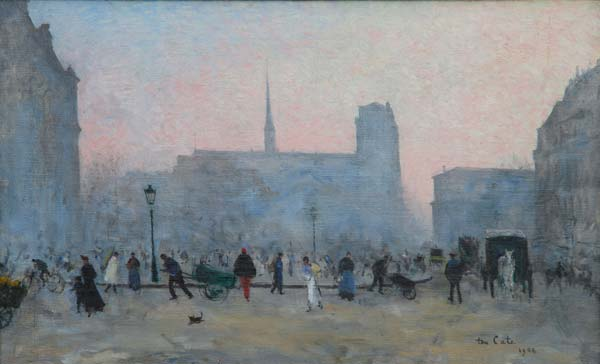
Street Scene near
Notre Dame
