= Elisabeth Geertruida Wassenbergh =

Dutch artist (1729–1781)

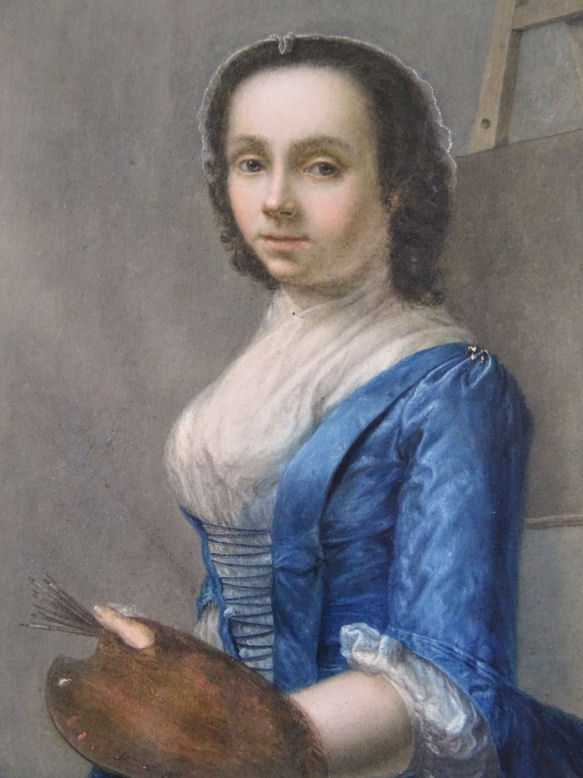
- Self-portrait 1754
- Born: May 29, 1729; Groningen, Netherlands
- Died: 1781 (aged 51–52); Groningen, Netherlands
- Known for: Painting
- Spouse: Jan Tiddo Fockens (m. 1778)

Elisabeth Geertruida Wassenbergh (1729–1781) was an 18th-century painter from the Dutch Republic.

== Biography ==
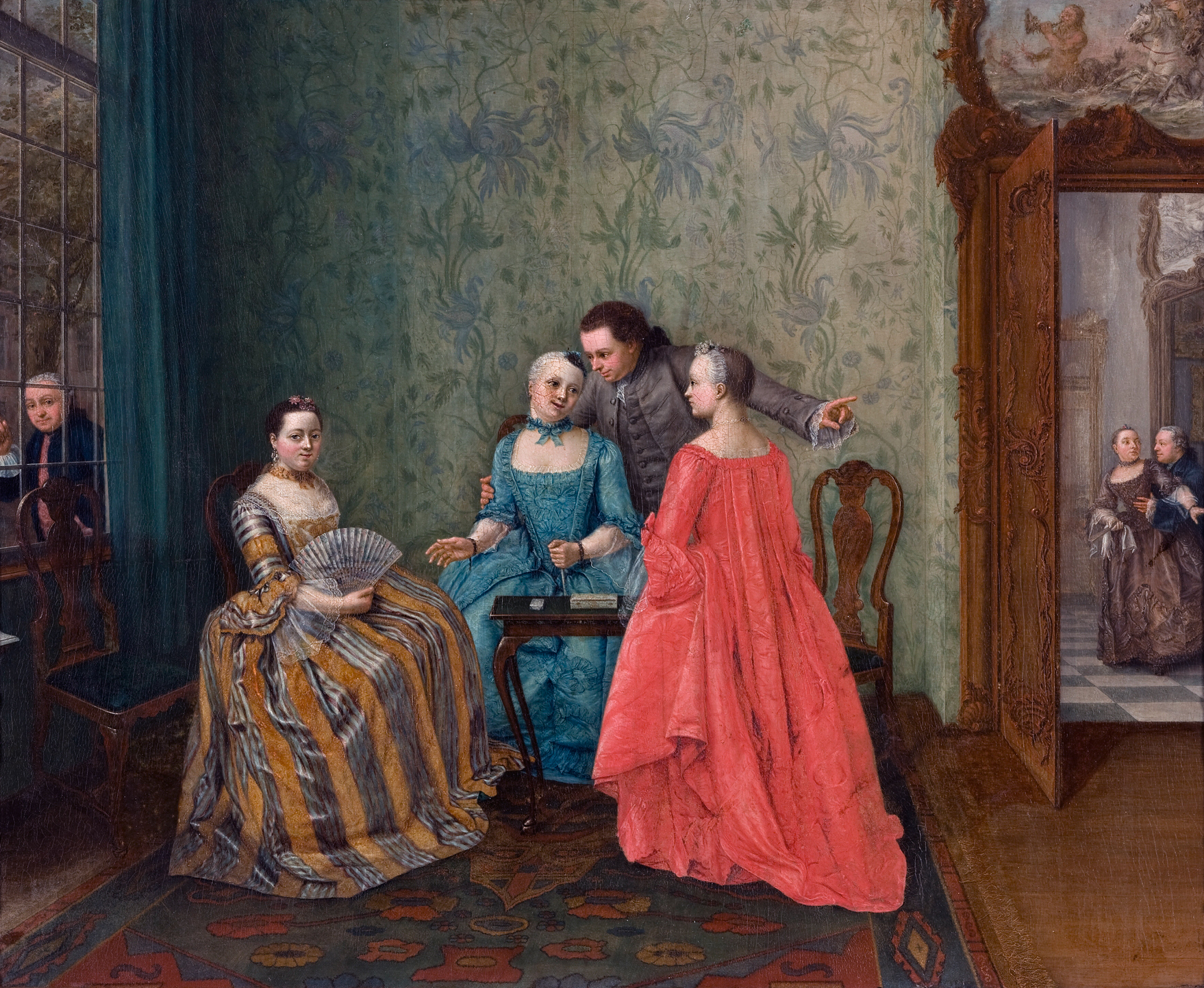
An elegant company, c.1756. This painting probably shows two works by her father, who was known for his "doorway decorations".

She was born and died in Groningen. According to Jan van Gool, she followed her father Jan Abel Wassenbergh in his art, while her sister became good at embroidering fruit and flowers.

According to the Rijksbureau voor Kunsthistorische Documentatie (RKD), she was the daughter of Jan Abel Wassenbergh (I). She is known for miniatures and genre works. A self-portrait by her dated 1754, was bought by the husband of a grand-niece at an auction sale in 1800.
