= Jan van Leyden (painter) =

Dutch Golden Age painter

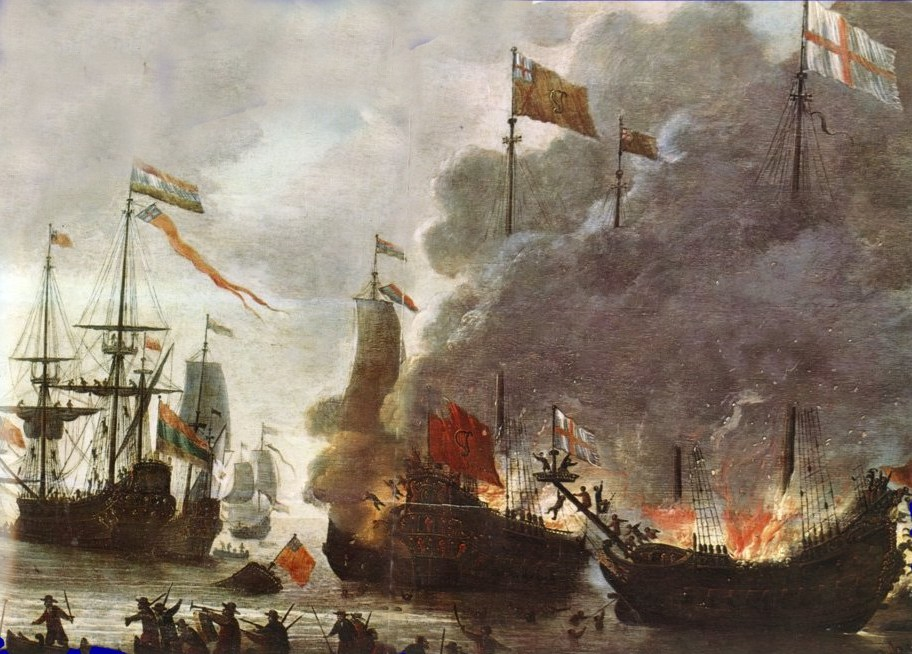
Raid on the Medway in 1667

Jan van Leyden (active 1661 – 1693), was a Dutch Golden Age painter.

== Biography ==
Little is known of his life, but he lived and worked in Rotterdam and is known for marines, often of specific sea battles.
