= Jacob Willemsz Delff the Younger =

Dutch Golden Age portrait painter (1619–1661)

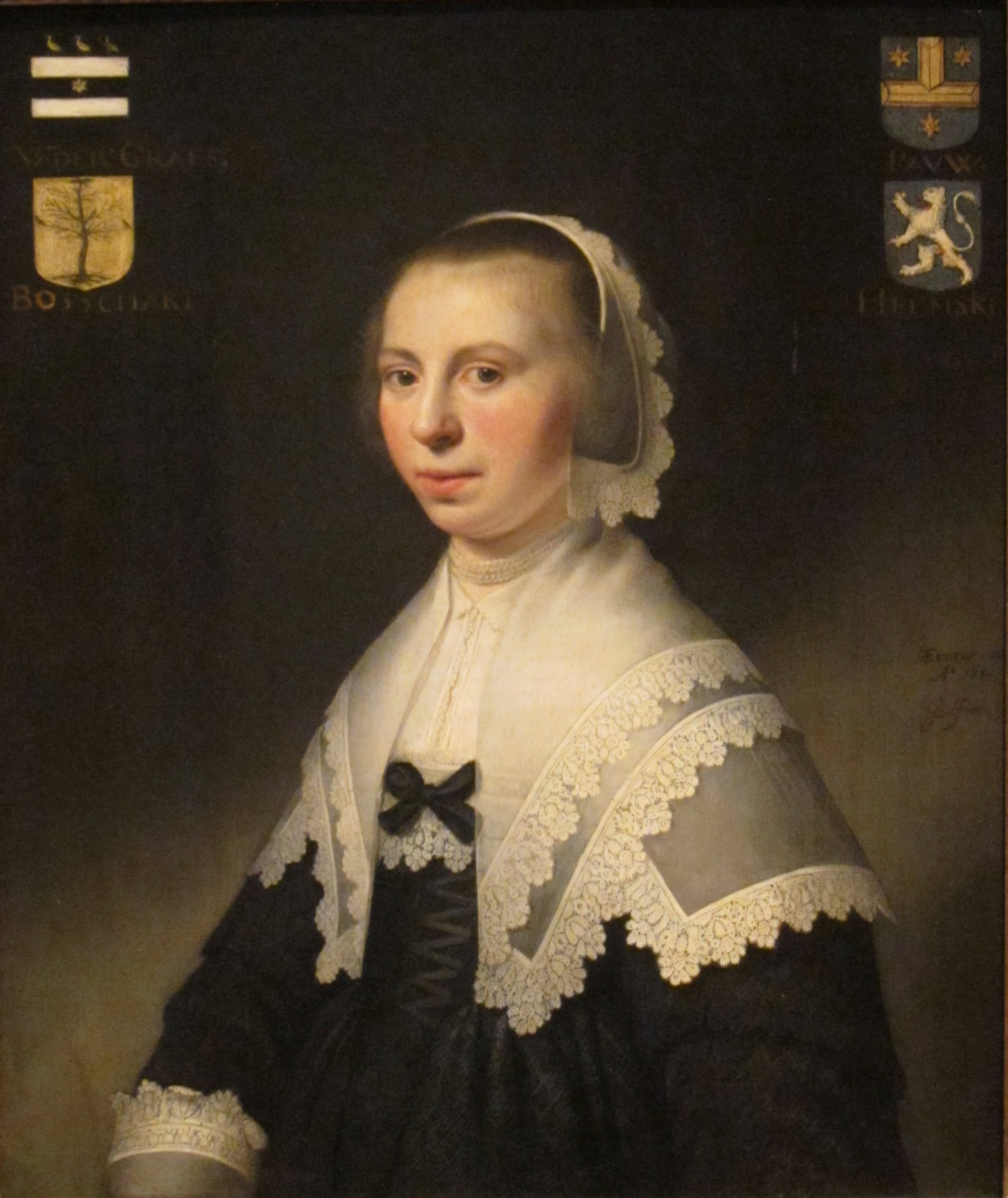
Portrait of Machteld van der Graeff, by Jacob Willemsz Delff the Younger, 1641

Jacob Willemsz Delff the Younger (1619, Delft – 1661, Delft), was a Dutch Golden Age portrait painter.

== Biography ==
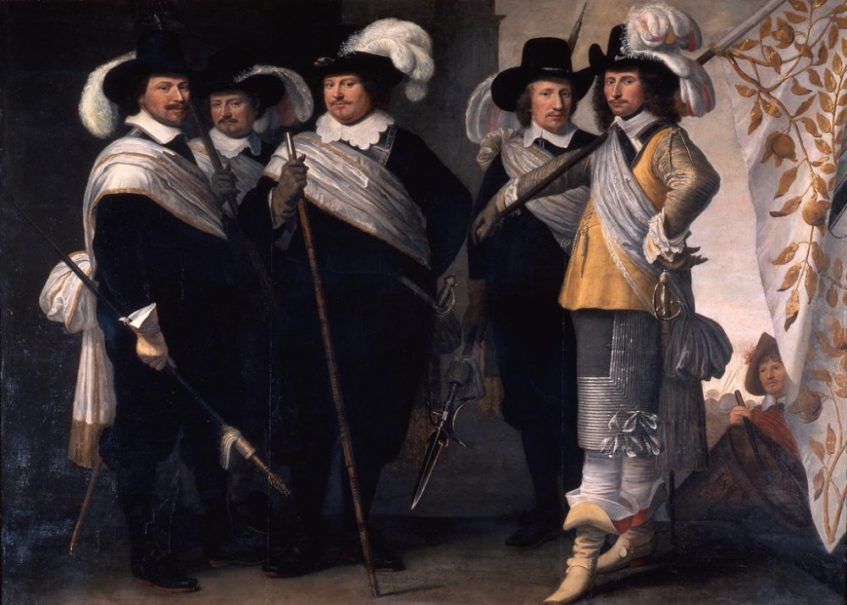
1648 Schutterstuk - from left to right: lieutenant Maerten Engelbertsz. Graswinckel; sergeant Samuel Claesz. Berckel; captain Carel Leenertsz. de Vooght; sergeant Willem Claesz. van Assendelft; flag bearer Pieter Harmensz. van Ruyven.

According to Houbraken he won a lucrative commission from the Delft vroedschap to repair his grandfather's schutterstuk after the Delft Explosion in 1654 damaged it. This showed not only the respect the young man had for his grandfather, but also the value that the Delft council placed on their schutterstuk by him.

According to the RKD his wedding portrait and the pendant of his wife were drawn from (now lost) paintings and are in the possession of the Leiden Library. The schutterstuk that Arnold Houbraken mentioned is in the Delft city hall, in the room reserved for weddings.
