= Willem de Famars Testas =

Dutch painter (1834–1896)

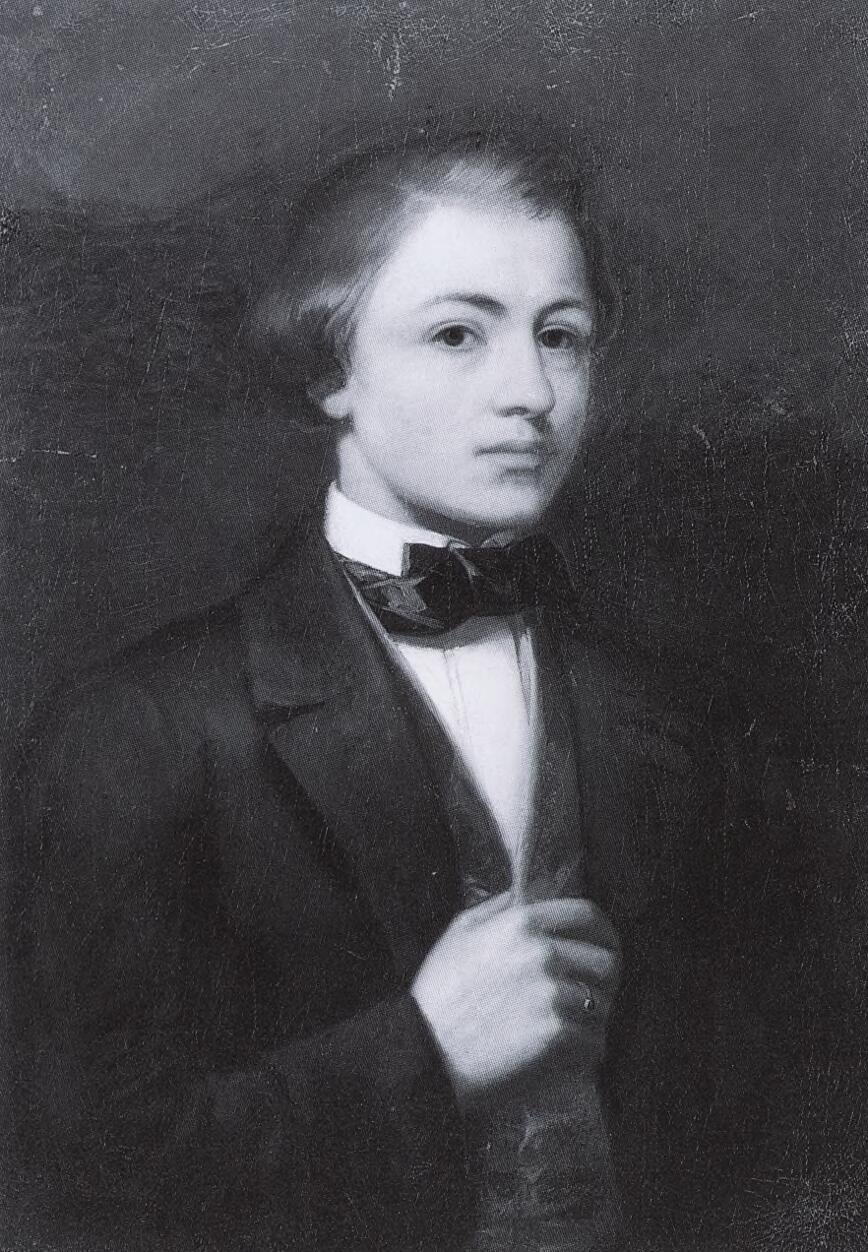
- Willem de Famars Testas, Self-portrait
- Born: 1834; Utrecht
- Died: 1896 (aged 61–62); Arnhem
- Education: Jacobus Everhardus Josephus van den Berg; Teeken-akademie, The Hague (1851–56)
- Known for: Painter, draughtsman, etcher and illustrator
- Movement: Orientalist

Willem de Famars Testas (1834, Utrecht – 1896, Arnhem), was a Dutch painter, draughtsman, etcher and illustrator noted for his Orientalist paintings and drawings.

== Biography ==
According to the RKD, he learned to paint from Jacobus Everhardus Josephus van den Berg and studied at the Akademie van beeldende kunsten in the Hague during the years 1853–1854. He travelled to Egypt in 1858-1860 and was in Brussels 1872–1885. He became a member of the artist society Schilder- en teekengenootschap Kunstliefde in Utrecht. His daughter Marie Madelaine de Famars Testas also became a painter.

== Gallery ==
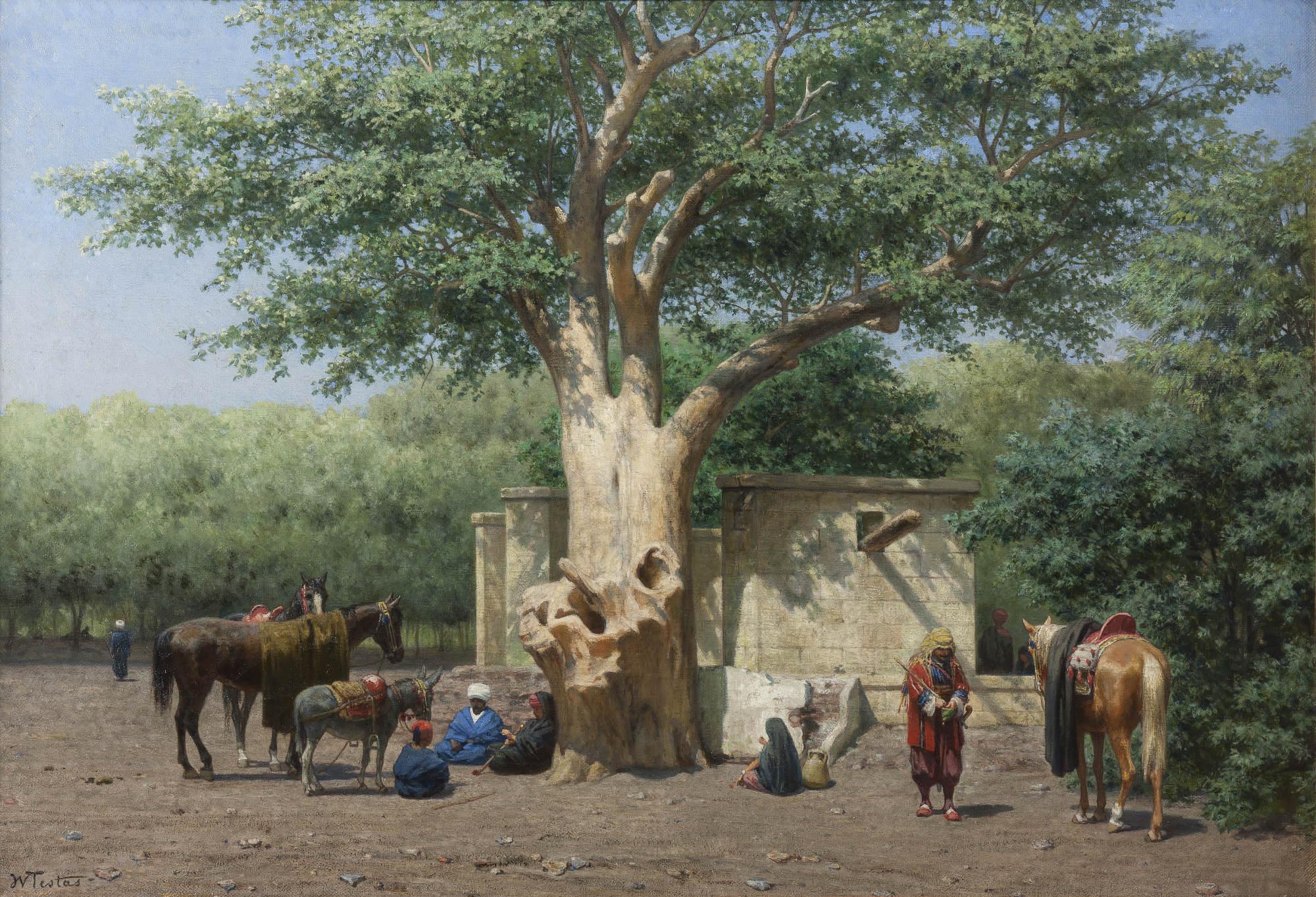
The Well and Sycamore in Ezbekieh Square, Cairo, c. 1858–60, collection Teylers Museum

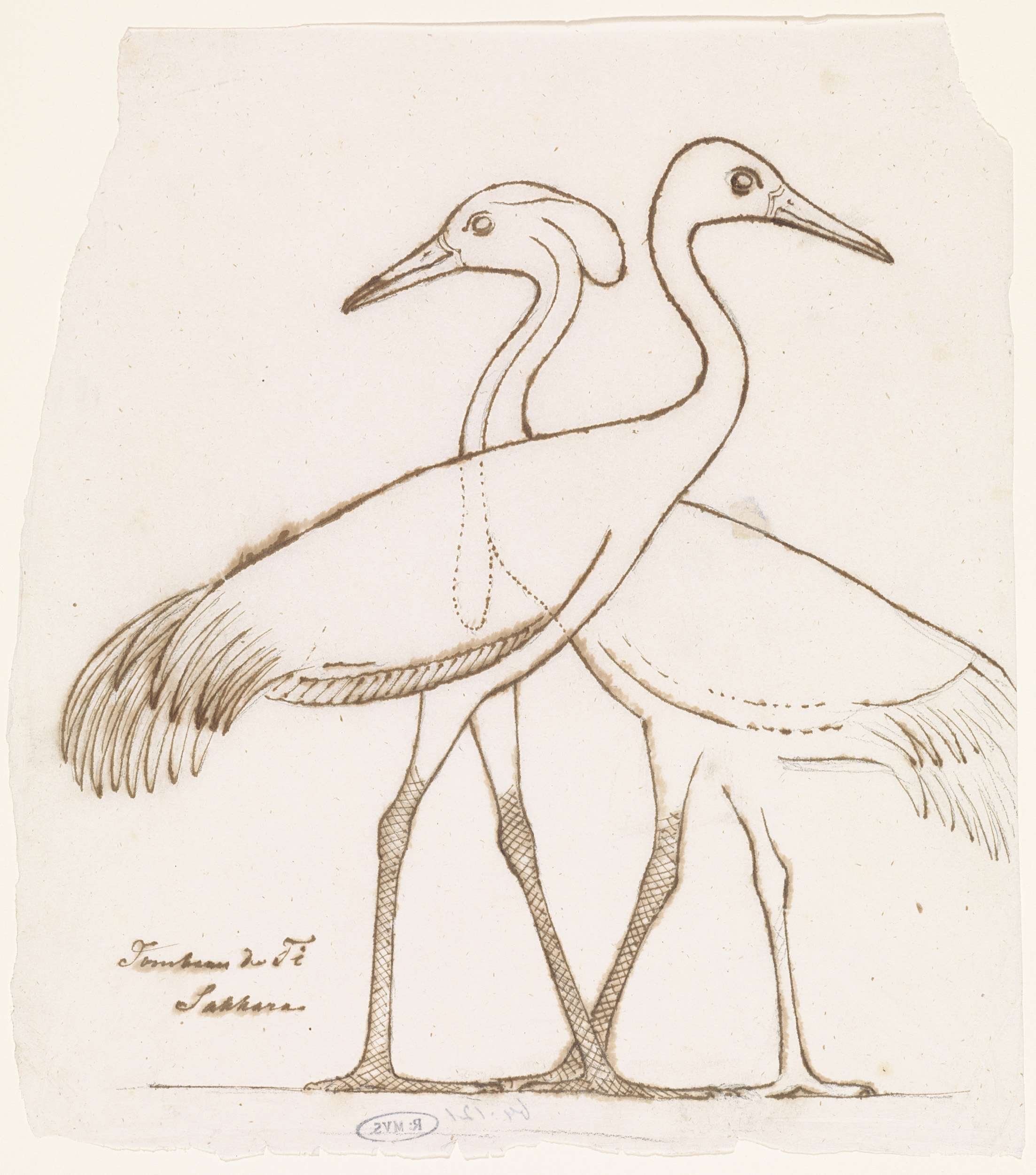
Egyptian relief sculpture: two cranes, drawing, c. 1844–96, collection Rijksmuseum

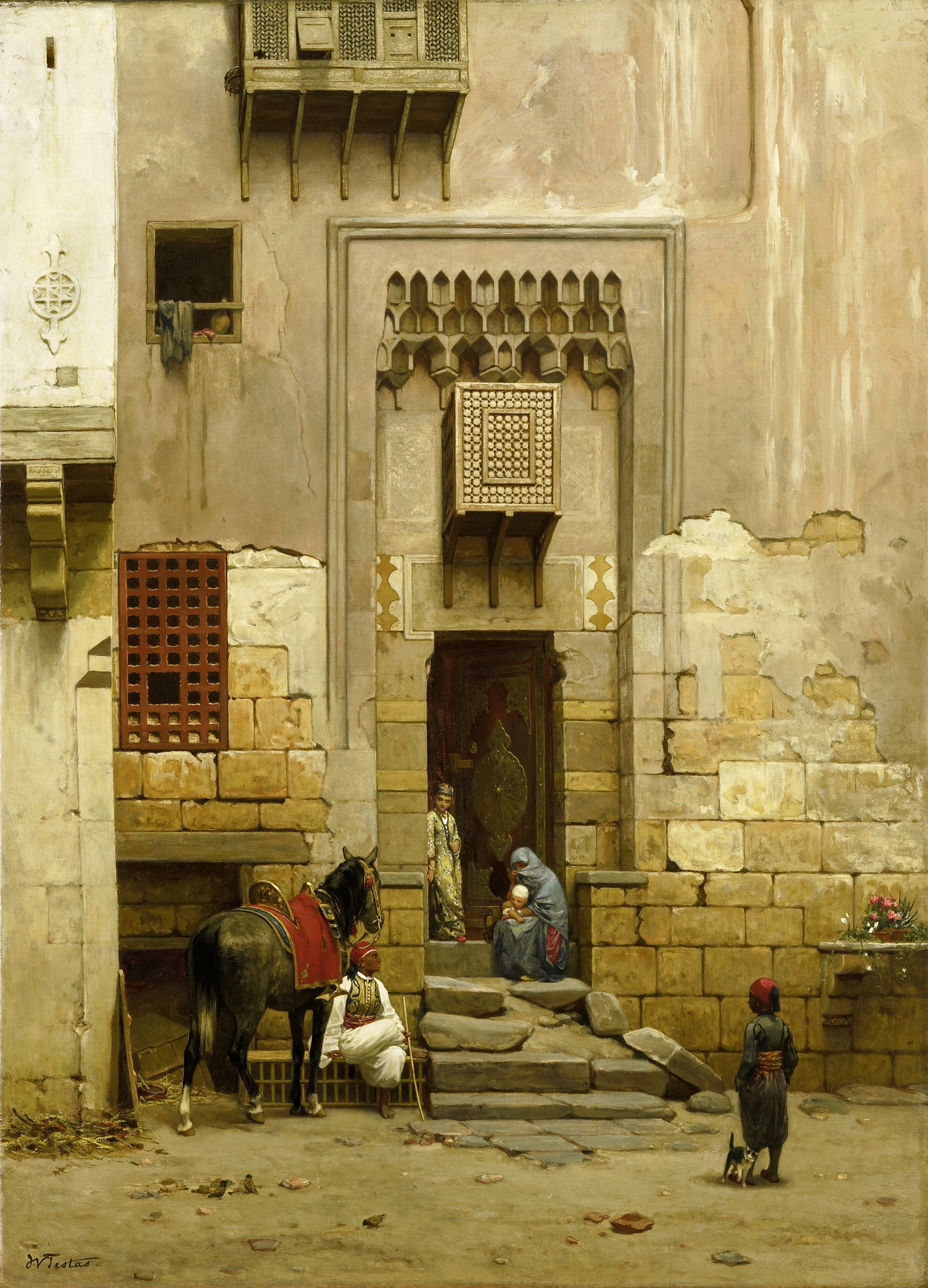
The Courtyard of a house in Cairo, c. 1868–81, oil on canvas, collection Rijksmuseum
