= Jan Woutersz Stap =

Dutch painter

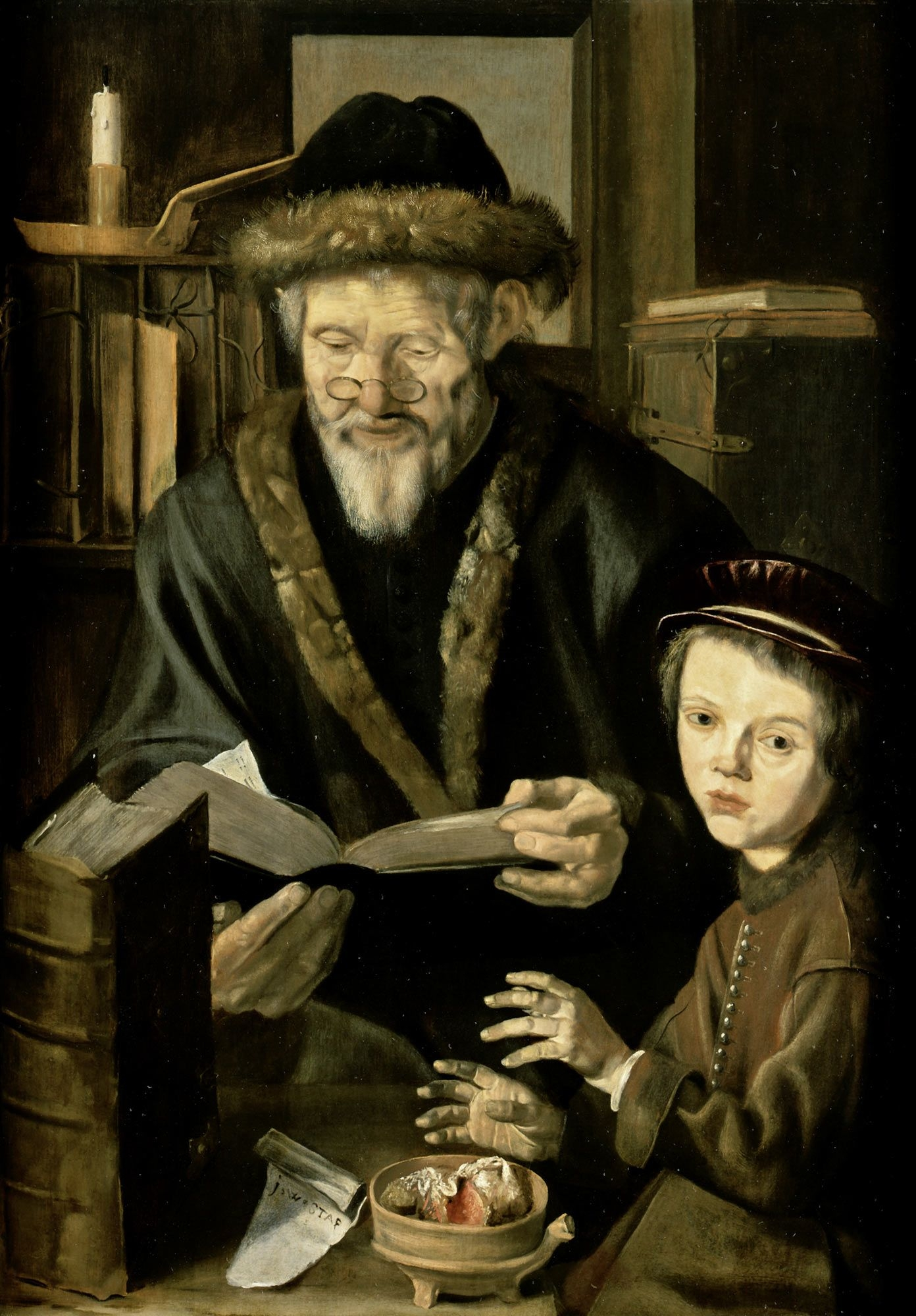
An Allegory of Winter

Jan Woutersz Stap (1599–1663), was a Dutch Golden Age painter.

== Biography ==
Little is known of his life, but he was born in Amsterdam in 1599 and is known for painting genre works in that city. Many of his attributed pieces appear to be portraits of people at work in some sort of allegorical context. Others are religious in nature, such as The Deposition (a painting of Christ being removed from the Cross) and The Entombment (a painting of Christ being placed in the tomb).

He died at Amsterdam in 1663.
