= Jan Meerhout =

Dutch Golden Age painter

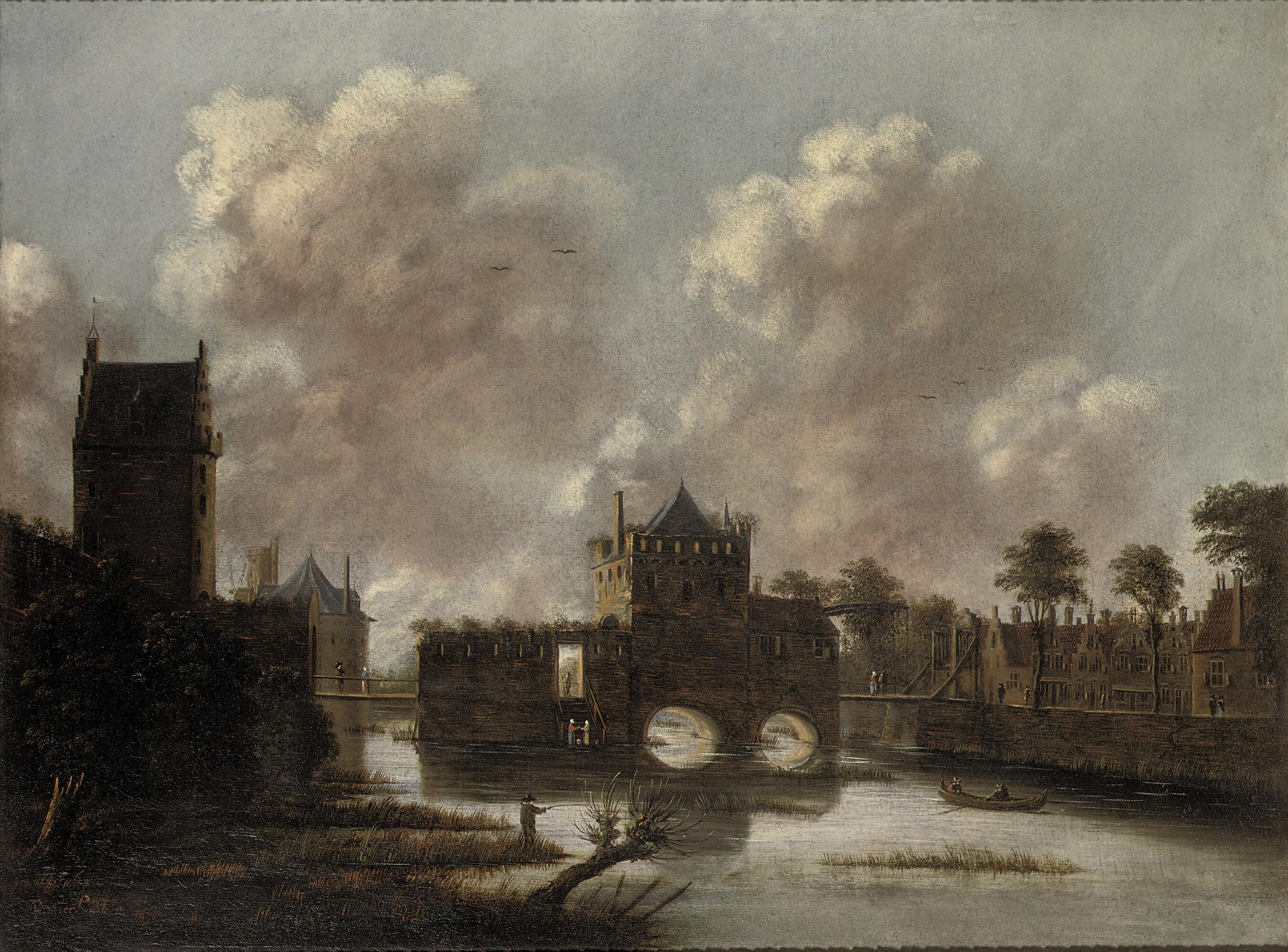
View of Wittevrouwenpoort, Utrecht

Jan Meerhout (before 1630, Gorinchem – 1677, Amsterdam), was a Dutch Golden Age painter.

== Biography ==
According to the RKD his birth date is uncertain, but he married in 1650. He worked in Utrecht, Heusden and Dordrecht as well as Amsterdam and Gorinchem and is known for cityscapes.
