= Louis Aimé Japy =

French painter

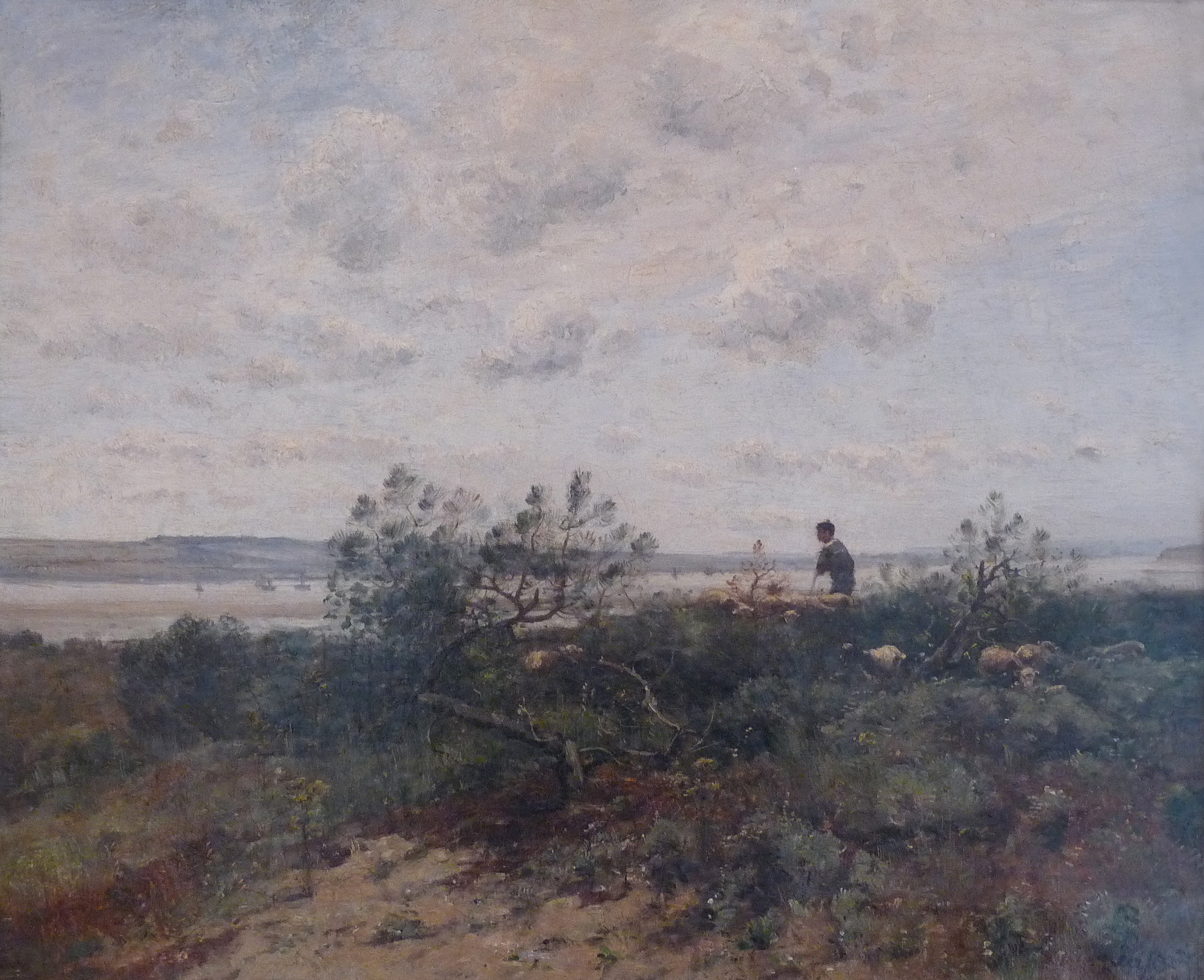
Landscape

Louis Aimé Japy (1840–1916) was a French painter.

He was born in Doubs and travelled to Paris where he became a pupil of Camille Corot and Francois-Louis Francais. He is known for landscapes and fruit and flower still lifes. He died in Paris.
