= Willem de Poorter =

Dutch Golden Age painter (1608–1668)

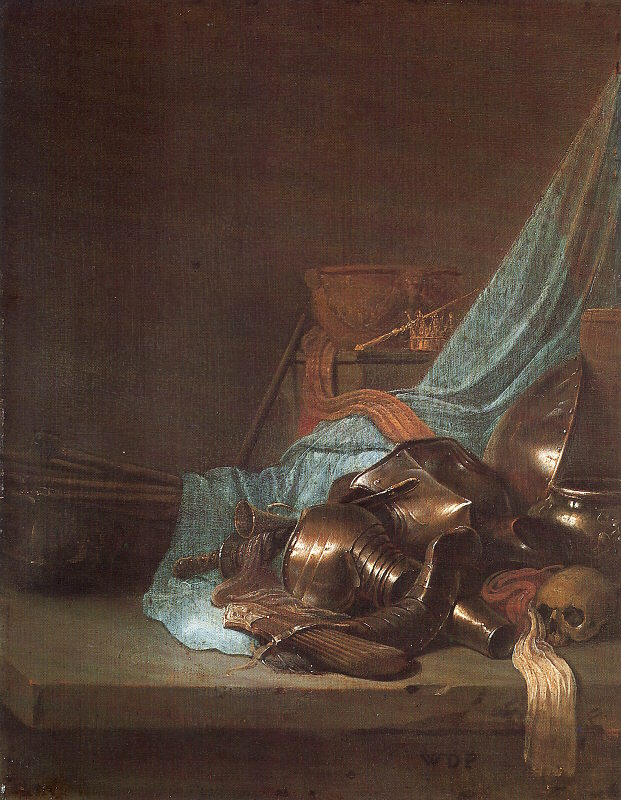
- 'Still life with armour.
- Born: Willem de Poorter; 1608; Haarlem
- Died: 1668 (aged 59–60); Haarlem
- Known for: Painting
- Movement: Baroque

Willem de Poorter (1608–1668) was a Dutch Golden Age painter.

== Biography ==
According to Houbraken he painted a very good Queen of Sheba, but he painted mostly still lifes.

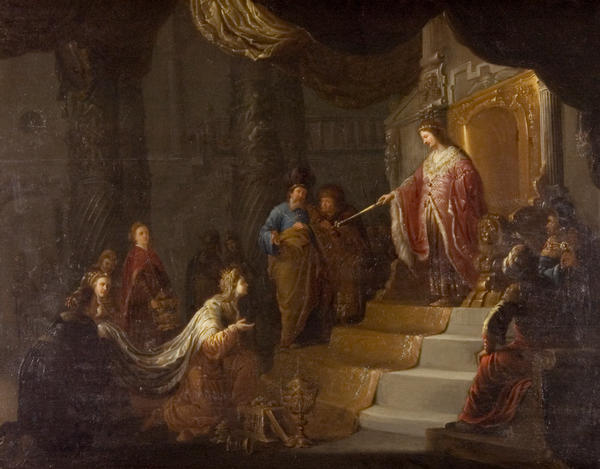
Queen of Sheba, c. 1645

His surviving paintings today are mainly small historical allegories and still lifes with metal objects. Though he has been considered in the past by (some) 19th century historians to have been a pupil of Rembrandt, he in fact lived and worked in Haarlem, not Amsterdam. He was registered as a painter in Haarlem in 1631 and in 1634 as a member of the Haarlem Guild of St. Luke. The confusion about being a pupil of Rembrandt comes from an incorrect reading of Houbraken, who mentions him in the same paragraph along with two other painters; a painter by the last name of Van Terlee, and the much younger Willem Drost, who did live in Amsterdam as a young man, and was in fact a pupil of Rembrandt there.

De Poorter later influenced Hendrick Martensz Sorgh.
