= Isaac van Duynen =

Dutch Golden Age painter

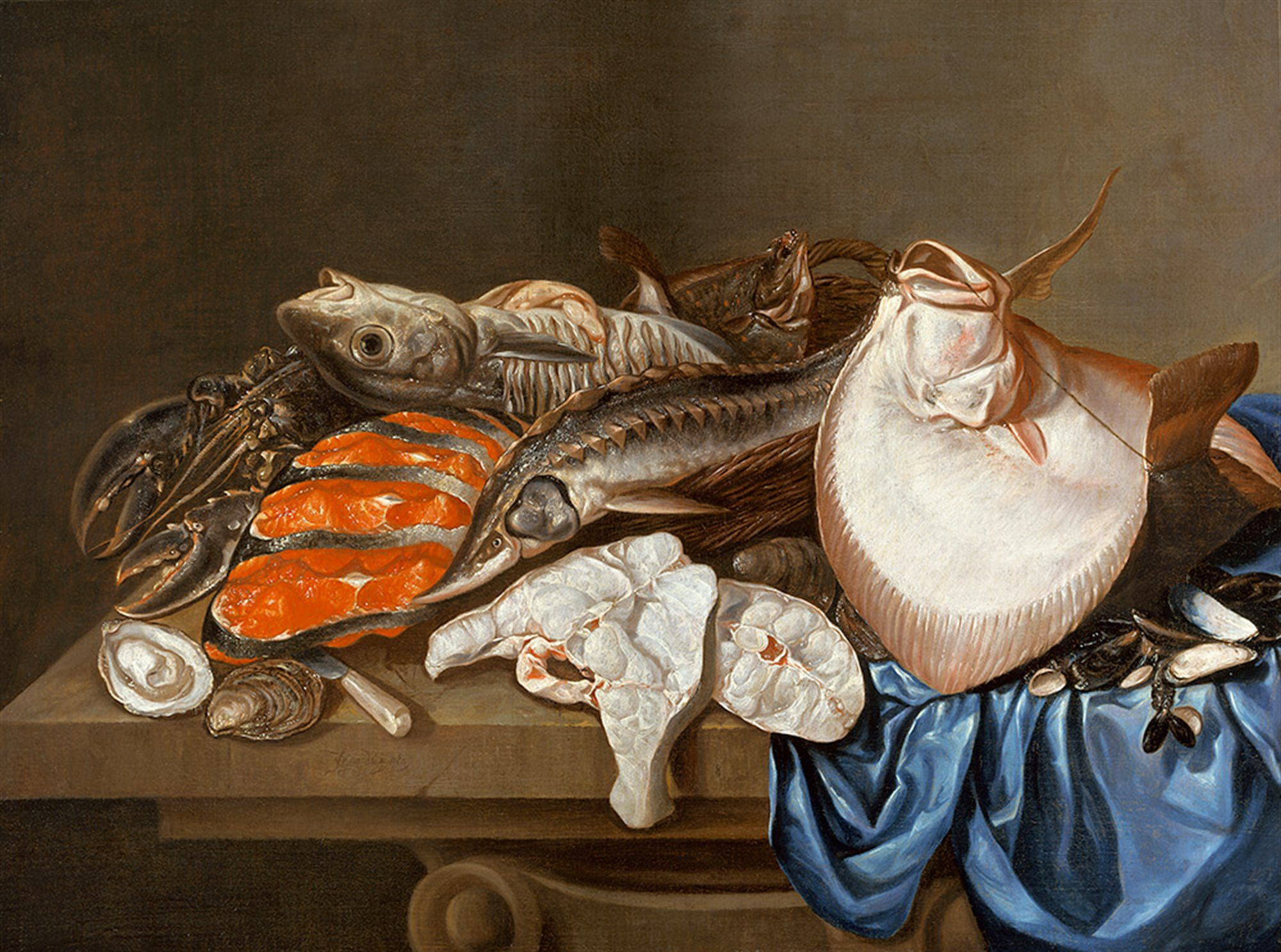
Still life with fish on a table

Isaac van Duynen also known as Deynen or Duijnen (April 1628 – ca. 1680) was a Dutch still life painter. He is known for still lifes of dead fish and other sea animals, still lifes with fruit, banquet still lifes and the occasional kitchen scene.

== Life ==
He was born in Dordrecht in April 1628. He was the son of Gerrit Gerritsz van Duynen, a well-off fishmonger. He had an older brother known as Abraham van Duijnen who became a landscape painter.

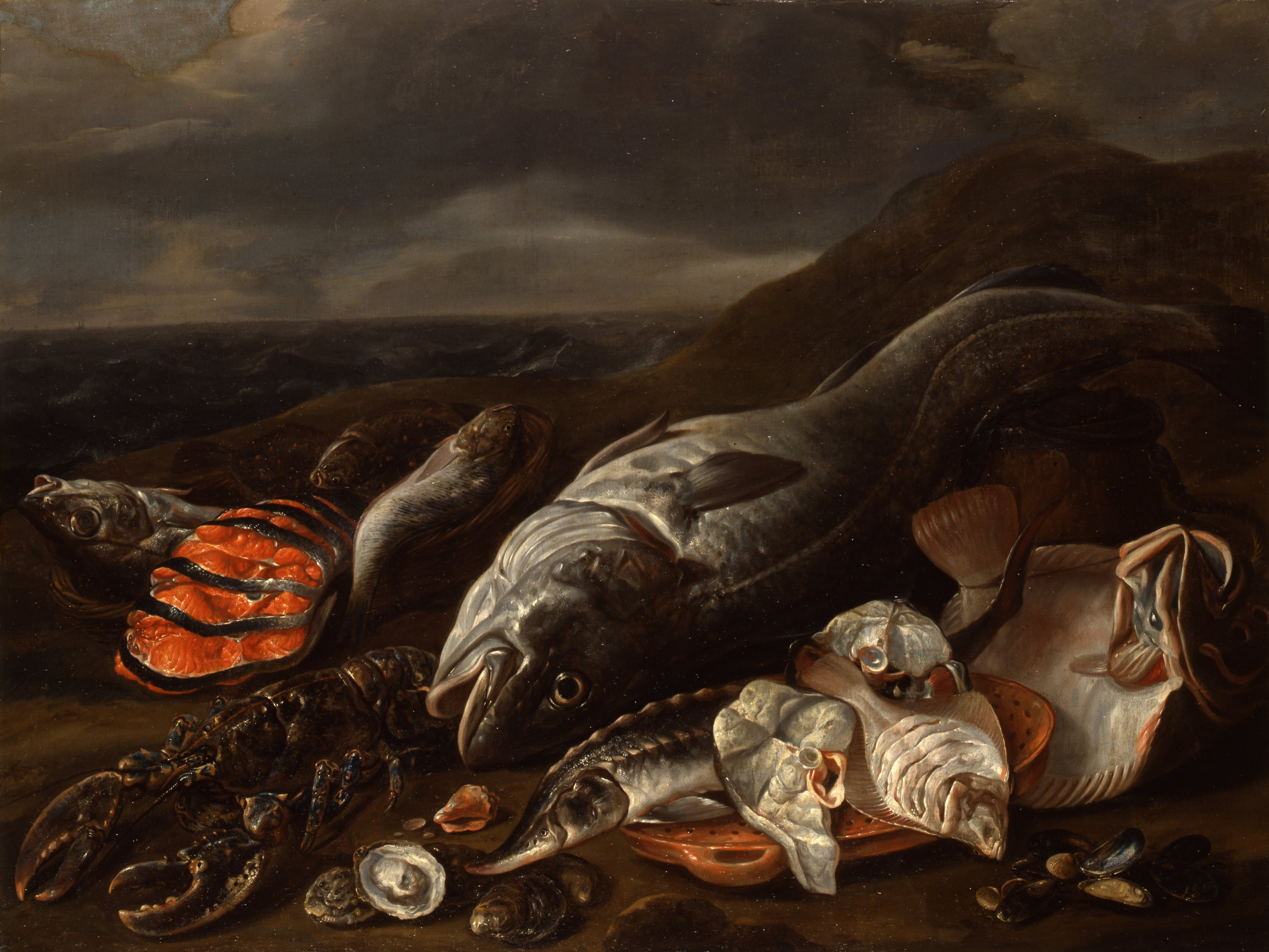
Fish still life in a landscape

It is not known with whom he trained. He may have been a pupil of Jacob Gerritsz. Cuyp. He worked in Dordrecht as an independent master between 1651 and 1654 when he left for Italy. He was in Rome from 1654 to 1657. From 1657 he lived in The Hague where he made his will on 11 September 1657. He would remain in The Hague for the rest of his life. He became a member of the Confrerie Pictura in The Hague in 1665. He married Maria van Bladen, probably in 1665. In that year he rented a house on the Groenmarkt with his father-in-law Pieter van Bladen. In 1666 he and his wife lived on the Lutherse Burgwal next to the Lutheran Church and some time later in the Schoolstraat.

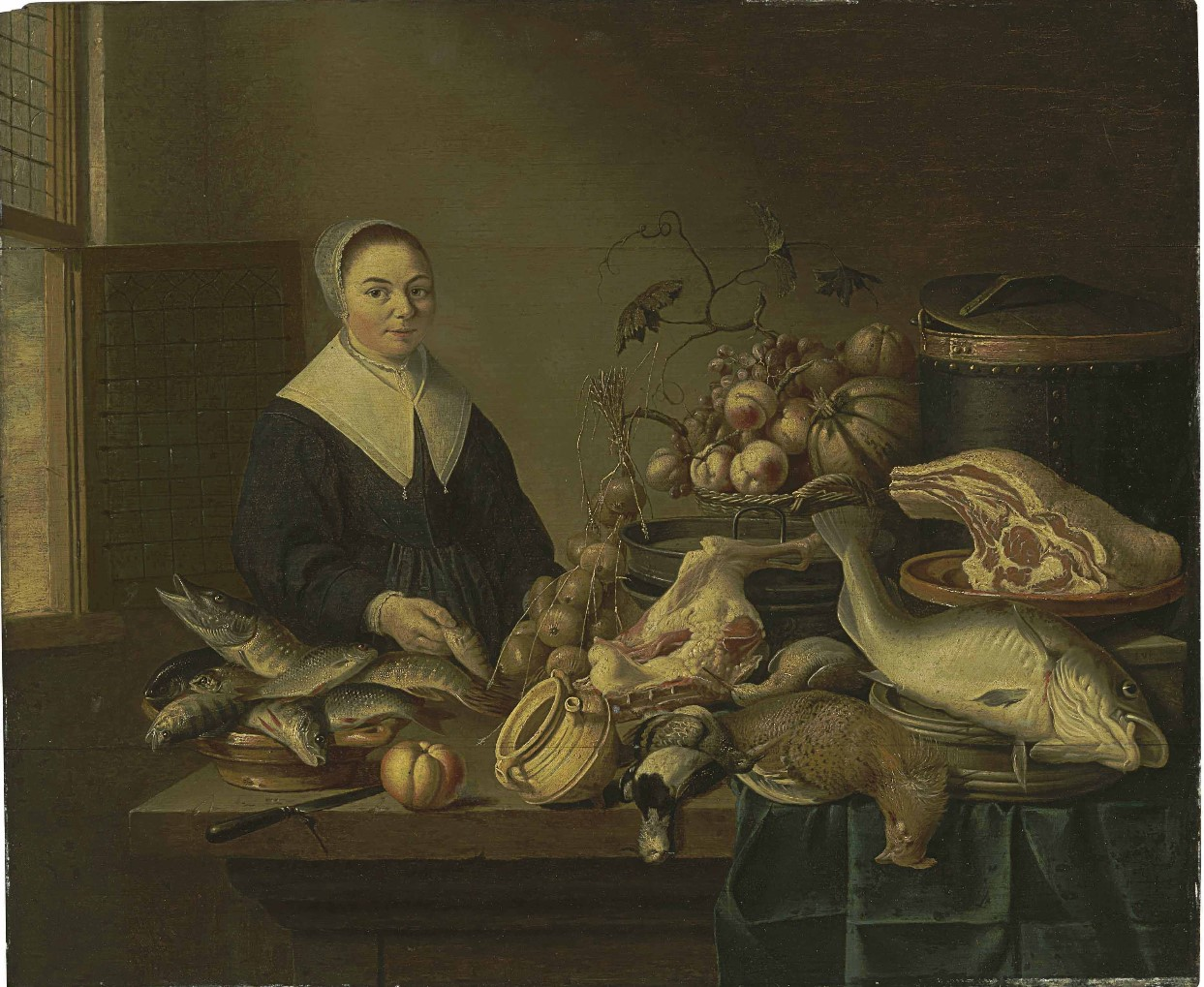
Kitchen interior with a maid

While working in The Hague, he stayed in touch with Dordrecht as demonstrated by the fact that in March 1673 he joined the civic militia of Dordrecht to fight the French invaders near Alphen aan de Rijn. Although he seemed to have inherited substantial wealth from his father, his later life is characterized by debts, especially with wine-dealers. He was reputed for his quarrelsome behavior and heavy drinking. His contemporaries described him as impertinent and rude.

He died some time between December 1679 when he is named in a notarial deed, and February 1681 when he is mentioned as deceased.

== Work ==
He is known for still lifes of dead fish and other sea animals, still lifes with fruit, banquet still lifes and the occasional kitchen scene. His works have been confused with those of Abraham van Beyeren, Alexander Adrianssen, Jan Dirven, Peeter van den Bemden, Benjamin Gerritsz Cuyp, and Jan Abel Wassenbergh.

He is regarded as a follower of Pieter van Noort and Jan Davidsz de Heem.
