= Pieter van Schaeyenborgh =

Flemish painter

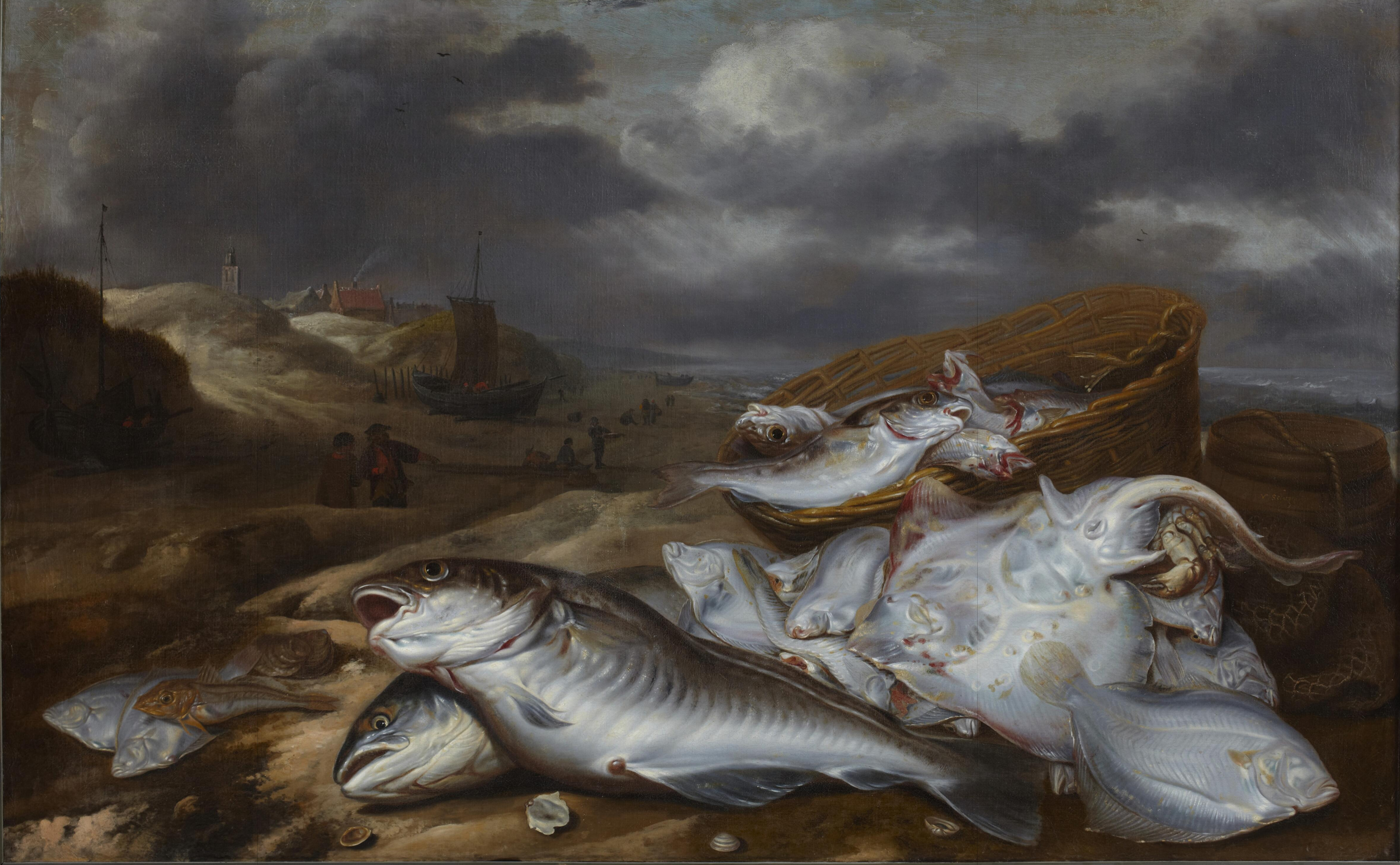
Fish still life with view of Egmond

Pieter van Schaeyenborgh (also van Schayenburch, and several other spellings; 1600, Antwerp – 1657, Alkmaar) was a Flemish painter, who worked in the Dutch Republic in the latter part of his career. He is known for his still lifes of fish.

== Life ==
Few details of his life and career are known. He was born to a family of fishmongers in Antwerp. He has been identified with the Peter Schaeyenborch who was in 1610 registered with the painters' guild (the Guild of Saint Luke) in Antwerp (Antwerpse Sint-Lucasgilde) as an apprentice of Daniël Christiaenssen.

In 1635, he was registered with the painters' guild in Alkmaar, and was active there until his death. In 1656 and 1657, the executors of the estate of Johan van Nordingen de Jonge (i.e. 'the Younger'; 1625/26-1656) paid him 48 and 56 guilders respectively for two paintings commissioned before van Nordingen's death. He also painted one of the two coats of arms for van Nordingen's grave; he and the other painter, Laurens van Oosthoorn, received 36 guilders each. (Note: That fee was paid to his wife Catharina, and it has been suggested that she controlled the purse-strings. However, it is possible that she had been widowed by the time the payment was made.) He taught the marine painter Jan Theunisz Blanckerhoff (1628–1669).

== Work ==
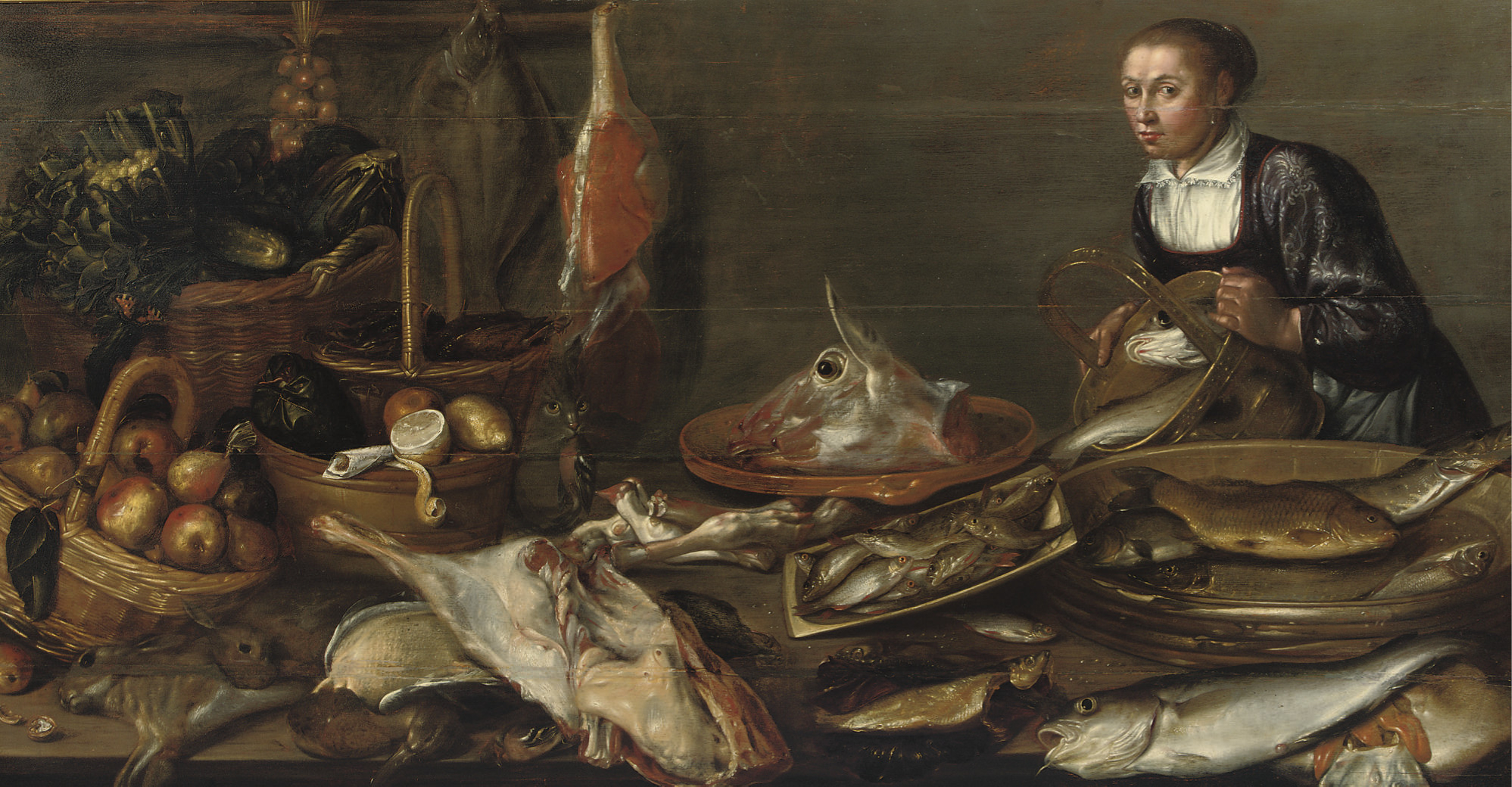
Fruit, vegetables, meat and fish on a table with a kitchen maid

Van Schaeyenborgh, Pieter de Putter and Jan Dirven were among the earliest Netherlandish painters to specialise in still lifes of fish as the main subjects of paintings rather than as incidental features in larger compositions.

He painted still lifes of fish, in oils, said to be very well executed. In 1914, some of his paintings were held on loan by the Stedelijk Museum Alkmaar. Until 1974, that museum held several of his paintings on loan from armenhuis van Nordingen; presumably Huis van Achten in Alkmaar, which had been founded using a legacy from van Nordingen. As of 2019, the museum displays his Visstilleven met gezicht op Egmond ('Still life of fish with view of Egmond') in its permanent collection.

In 2019, a group of van Schaeyenborgh's paintings was exhibited at the Stedelijk Museum Alkmaar. The catalogue praised his depictions of fish which look as if they have just been caught, with beautiful scales and water droplets you can almost touch.

== Gallery ==
Selected works

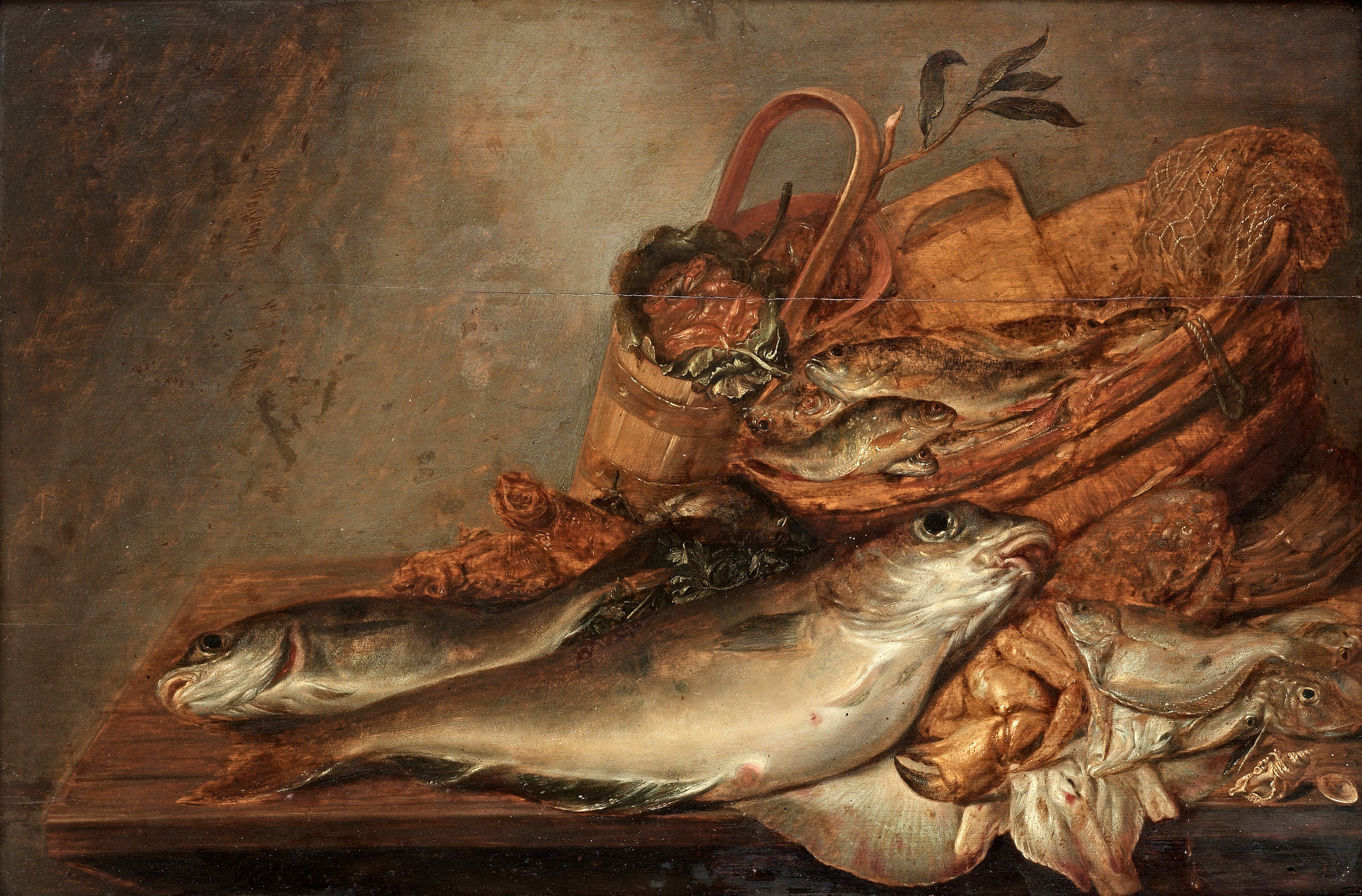
Still life of fish and shellfish

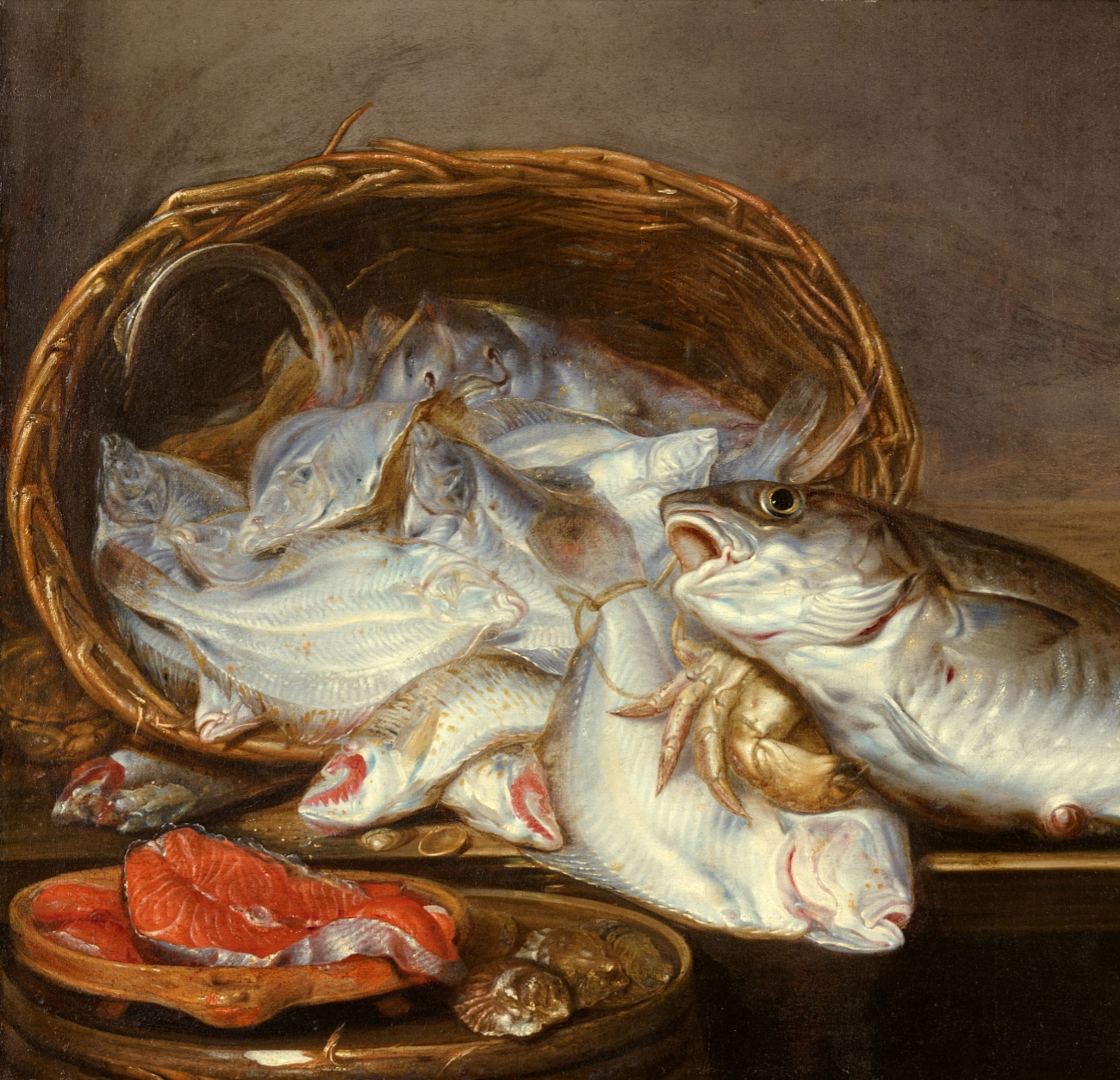
Large still life with fish

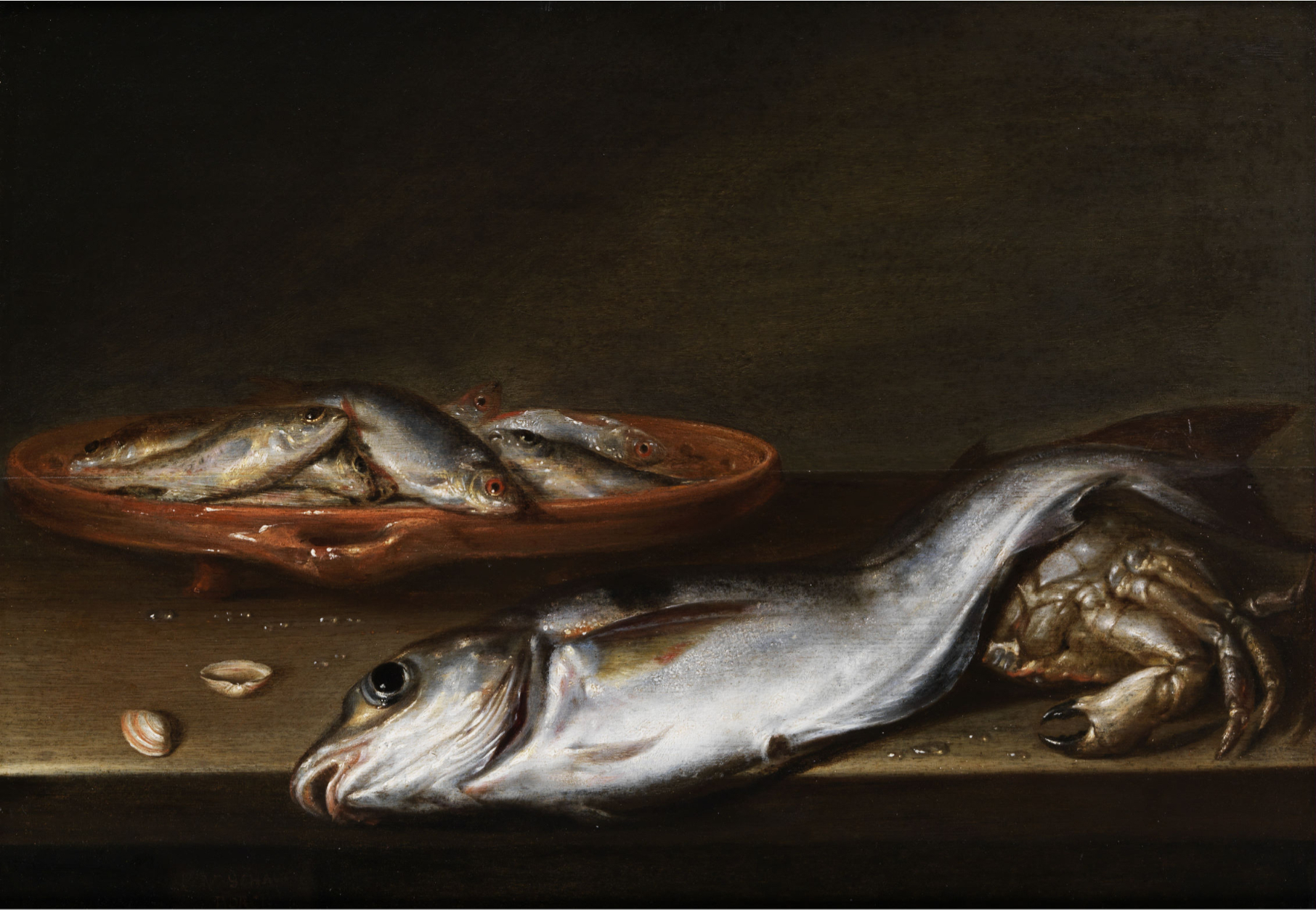
Still life of fish on a wooden table; probably 1650s
