= Jan Dirven =

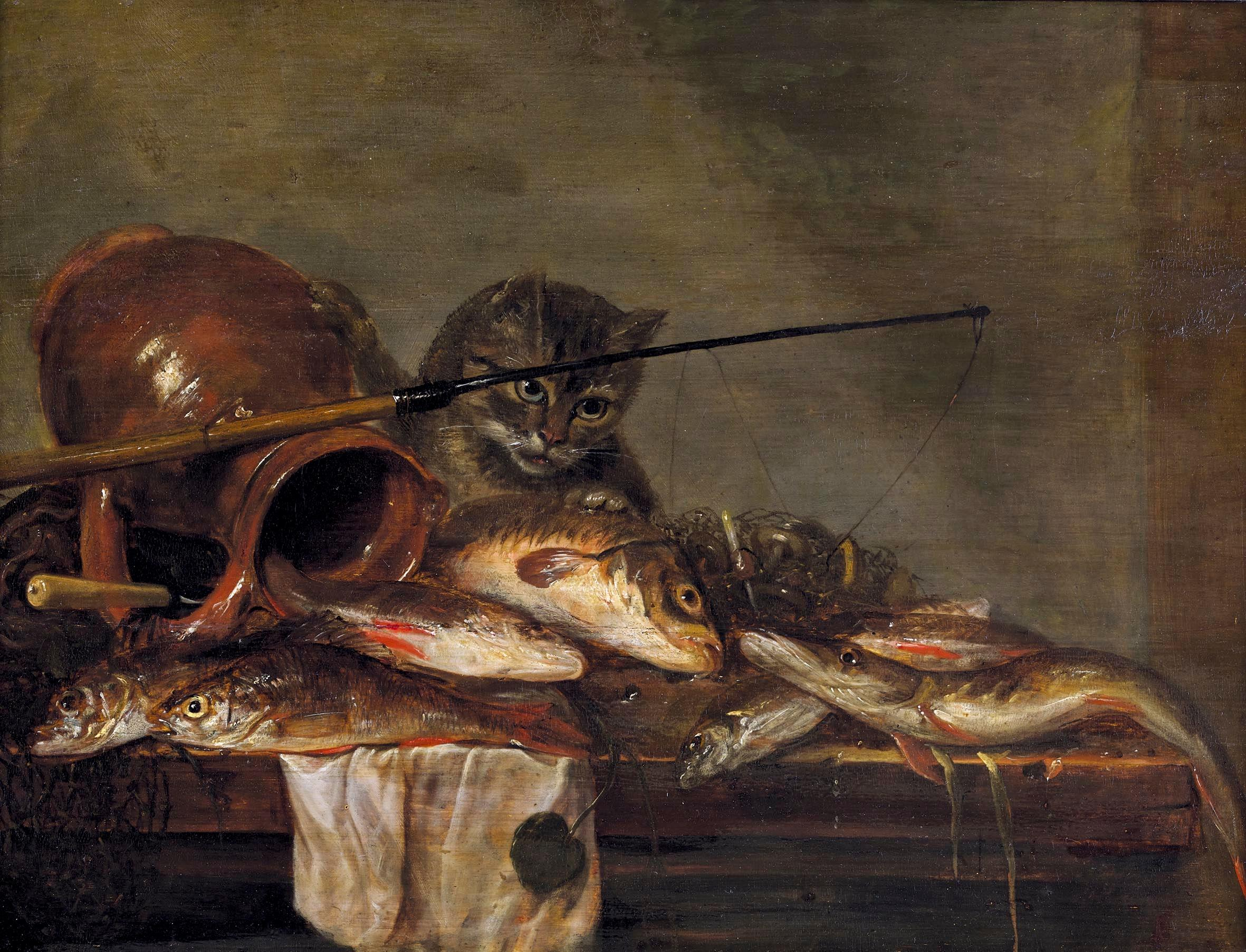
Still life with fish catch, fishing rod and curious cat

Jan Dirven (baptized 8 April 1625 – before 5 December 1653) was a Flemish still life painter who was active in Antwerp. He painted fish still lifes and banquet still lifes which are stylistically linked to the style of the Antwerp painter Alexander Adriaenssen and The Hague school of still life painters such as Abraham van Beijeren and Isaac van Duynen.

== Life ==
Jan was born in Antwerp as the son of Adriaen Cornelis Dirven (originally from Princenhage, a village to the south-west of Breda) and Helena (or Selina) van Dael. His mother was a merchant in high-fat dairy products such as cheese, butter or cream, in addition to oil, fat and candles. His father had by 1617 become a poorter (burgher) of Antwerp, where he was active in the local tapestry trade. His father died when Jan was only 5 years old. His mother later married Herman van Clermont of Antwerp.

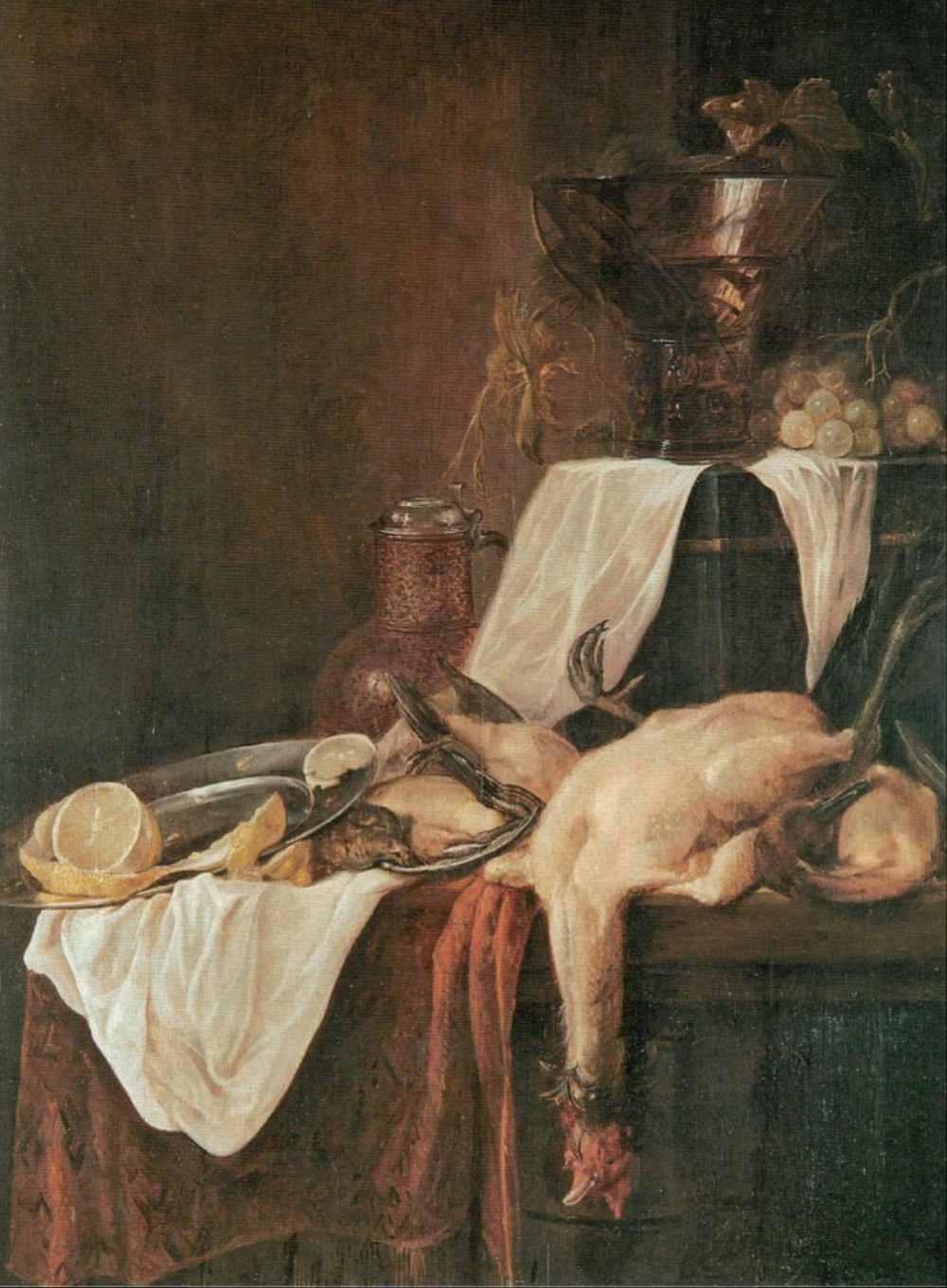
Banquet still life

Jan started his artistic training at the age of 7. he was first registered at the Antwerp Guild of St Luke in the guild year 1632-1633 as an apprentice of Rombout Meesens. Rombout Meesens is an obscure painter to whom no known works are attributed. Dirven never registered as a master of the Antwerp Guild, although this was in 17th-century Antwerp a condition for a painter to be allowed to sign his own works. To explain why Dirven did not register as a master in Antwerp some art historians have surmised that he travelled to the Dutch Republic, in particular to The Hague, as there appear to be stylistic and thematic similarities between his work and that of Dutch still life painters Abraham van Beijeren and Isaac van Duynen who worked in that city. However, there is no known evidence which would document such a career outside of Antwerp. His death was moreover recorded in the records of Antwerp Guild in 1653. Further, a person named Jan Dirven recorded as a resident at the Schuttershofstraat in the center of Antwerp may have been the painter who died young. Finally, Dirven used wood panels bearing the pyrographed mark of the panelmakers corporation of Antwerp. These different elements indicate a continued presence of Dirven in Antwerp.

He died in Antwerp in late 1653 in his 28th year. The costs for his funeral were settled by the Antwerp Guild of Saint Luke before 5 December 1653.

== Work ==
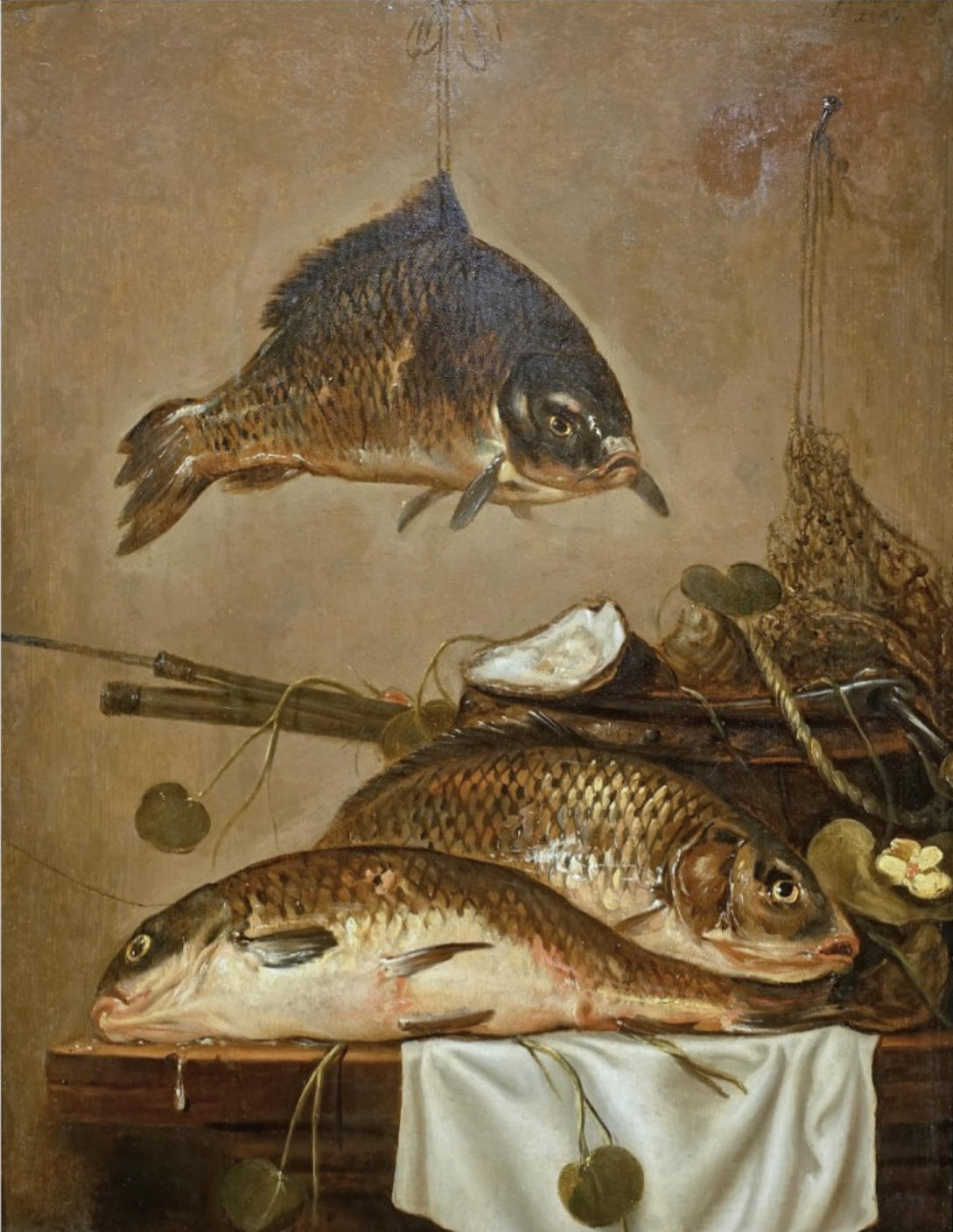
Still Life with fish on a table and a suspended fish

Jan Dirven was a painter of fish still lifes and banquet still lifes. Only 9 paintings bearing a signature or a monogram characterised by a letter J in a somewhat particular style of calligraphy are currently attributed to the artist. Six of them are dated. His dated still lifes are dated to 1648 and 1649 and one bears a date that cannot be read with certainty (164[?]). Seven of the 9 paintings are painted on panel and represent fish lying on a table while the two other paintings are painted on canvas and fall in the class of pronkstillevens, i.e. sumptuous still lifes of fruit, game, birds, expensive drinking glasses and tableware, exotic shells and other exclusive object such as watches.

In the first class of still lifes, the fish are all fresh-water fish, depicted in some cases along oysters or crayfish and always with one or more tools to catch or transport fish such as rods, nets or wooden buckets. In two of these paintings, large fish are suspended from the ceiling by a cord. Typical for Dirven's fish still lifes is the inclusion in the scene of the leaves, and, in one instance, a flower, of a very particular rare aquatic plant ‒ the European frogbit (hydrocharis morsus-ranae). One of his paintings include a cat with near the dead fish, which shows the influence of the Antwerp still life painter Alexander Adriaenssen who painted many paintings of cats with fish. Dirven aimed for a highly realistic representation of the fish and other objects included in his works. He may also have intended to send some hidden messages through his works. The painting with the cat looking greedily at the dead fish may illustrate a proverb very popular in Antwerp between 1610 and 1660 which goes as follows: "De kat wil wel visch eten, maer geen poot nat maken" (The cat wants to eat fish without wetting its paws). It denounces those who profiteer from others as cats that help themselves to fish not caught by themselves. Those profiteers included the local Catholic clergy sometimes referred to at the time as 'kloosterkatten' ('monastery cats').

In his 'pronkstillevens' Dirven also shows his knowledge of the work of Adriaenssen. These works, illustrating luxury products in bourgeois interiors, were likely produced to cater to the taste of the affluent bourgeoisie of Antwerp.

His paintings are regarded as being close to the monochrome style of Pieter de Putter and Isaac van Duynen, representatives of "The Hague School" of still life painters.
