= Anna van den Queborn =

Dutch still life painter (c.1625 – c.1689)

- Born: c. 1625; The Hague, Dutch Republic
- Died: c. 1689 (aged 63–64); Possibly Overschie, Dutch Republic
- Other name: Anna van Beijeren
- Spouse: Abraham van Beijeren (m. 1647)
- Children: 1
- Relatives: Daniël van den Queborn (grandfather); Pieter de Putter (uncle)

Anna van den Queborn (c. 1625 – c. 1689) was a Dutch painter of still lifes, believed to have been a teacher to Maria van Oosterwijck.

== Biography ==
Van den Queborn was born around 1625 in The Hague to Crispijn van den Queborn, a portrait painter and engraver, and Anna Gabry. The paternal granddaughter of the painter Daniël van den Queborn, Van den Queborn was the niece of the painter Pieter de Putter. Van den Queborn was possibly trained as a painter by her father. On 3 February 1647, Van den Queborn married the still life painter Abraham van Beijeren. The couple had at least one son, Bredius, who died in infancy.

Alongside her own painting, Van den Queborn assisted her husband in preparing canvases and paints. In 1648, Van den Queborn is known to have auctioned a painting under the Hague Painters' Guild. (Note: Also cited as 1647.) The family moved to Delft in 1657, where Van den Queborn is believed to have been a teacher to the painter Maria van Oosterwijck. Remaining in Delft until 1663, the couple later settled in Amsterdam where they maintained contact with Van Oosterwijck and Willem van Aelst.

The family later moved to Alkmaar in 1674, Gouda in 1675, before settling in Overschie from 1677. Van den Queborn likely died in 1689, presumably in Overschie.
