= Jasper Geeraards =

Flemish painter

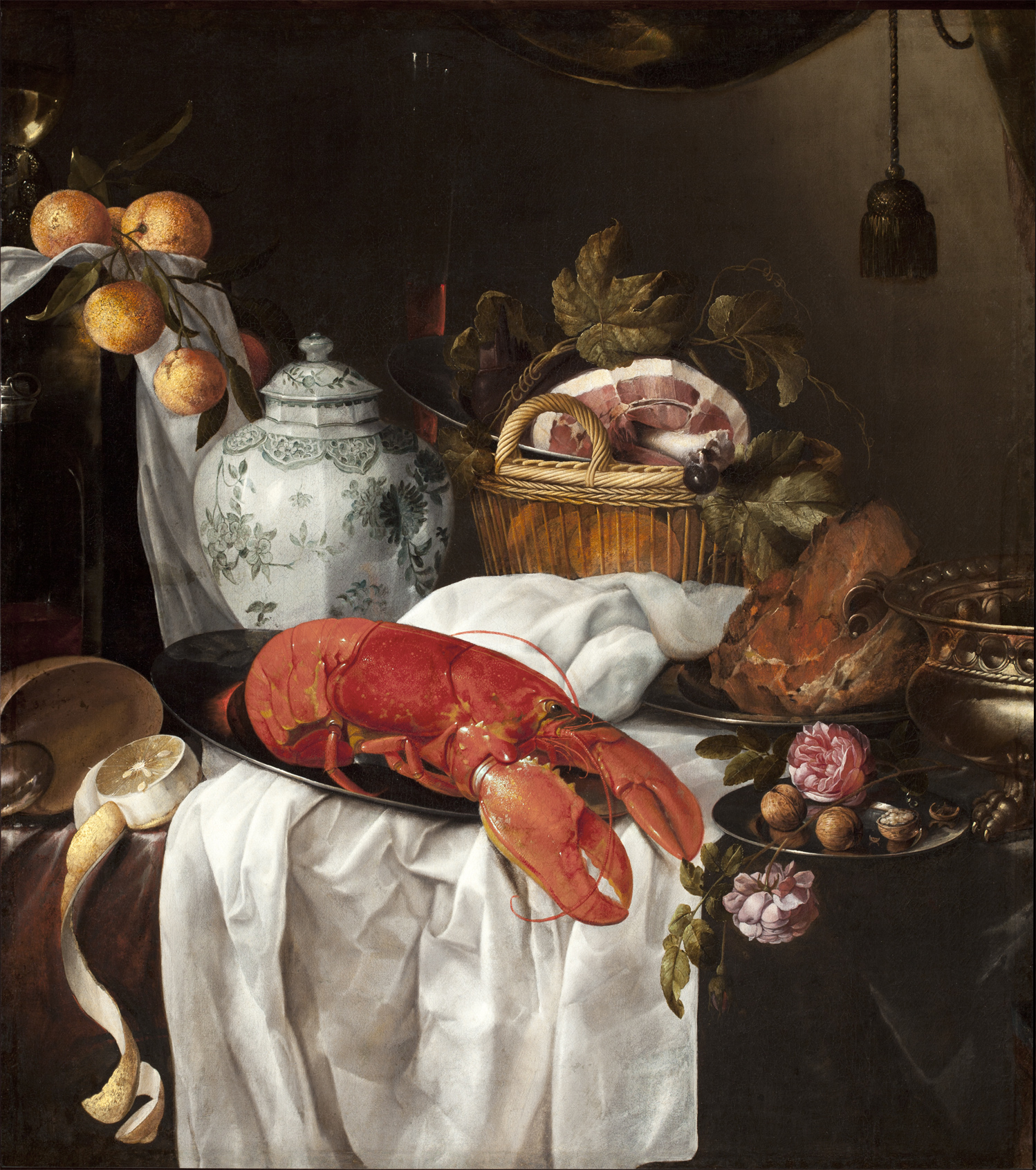
Pronk still life with lobster, Museum Bredius

Jasper Geerards, Jasper Geerardi or Jasper Geeraerts (c. 1620 – between 1649 and 1654) was a Flemish painter who specialized in still lifes and in particular pronkstillevens (ostentatious still lifes). He was active in Antwerp and Amsterdam.

== Life ==
Very little is known with certainty about the life of Geeraards. He is believed to have been born in Antwerp around 1620. He trained in Antwerp where he was registered as a pupil in the Guild of Saint Luke in 1634. It is possible, although there is no documentary evidence to support this assumption, that he studied for a while under the prominent Dutch still life painter Jan Davidsz. de Heem who settled in Antwerp in 1636. He became a master of the Guild in 1644.

After starting his career in Antwerp he moved to Amsterdam where he is mentioned in 1649. He died, possibly in Amsterdam, between August 1649, the date on which he reported the theft of a still life from his Amsterdam studio and 19 October 1654, the date of a notarial document in which his wife is referred to as a widow.

== Work ==
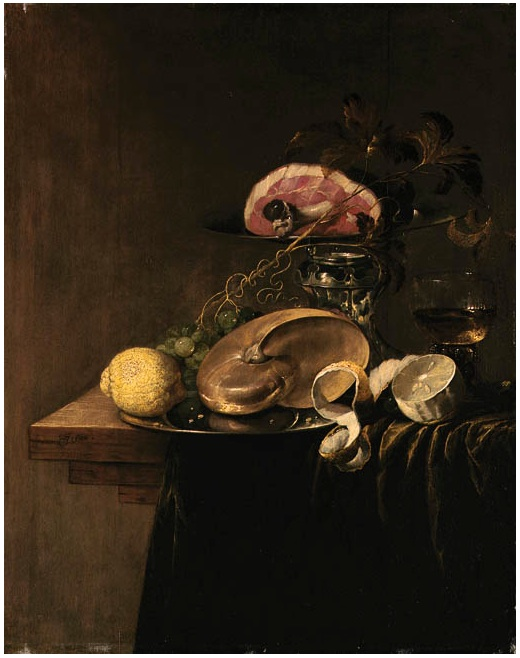
Still life with a nautilus shell and a lemon

Geerards specialized in still lifes and in particular 'pronkstillevens', which he started to paint from c. 1640. It is difficult to establish a stylistic evolution in his work as only a few dated works are known: one dated 1646 and two dated 1648. He painted his more mature works around the 1650s. In addition to smaller scale works he is also known to have painted large canvases such as a composition (formerly attributed to de Heem) in the musée Saint-Loup in Troyes, France the size of which is 116 by 162 cm.

His work shows him chiefly as a follower of Jan Davidsz. de Heem who may have been his teacher for a while. Some of his works have previously been attributed to de Heem.

A Pronk still life with lobster in the collection of the Museum Bredius in The Hague was attributed to Jasper Geerards after it was cleaned during a major restoration in the period 1979–1983. It was discovered during the restoration that it was a fragment of a big "pronkstilleven" (ostentatious still life) in the style of Jan Davidsz. de Heem of which parts on both sides and the top had been removed. It is likely that during earlier overpaintings of the original various elements where added to the painting such as the Delft vase and the two roses at the lower right, possibly to adapt the composition to then prevailing tastes.

His still lifes are signed with J or Jasper Geerards or Geerardi. It is not known when the painter adopted the name Geerardi, nor whether he used the two names alternately.
