= Pieter de Putter =

Dutch painter

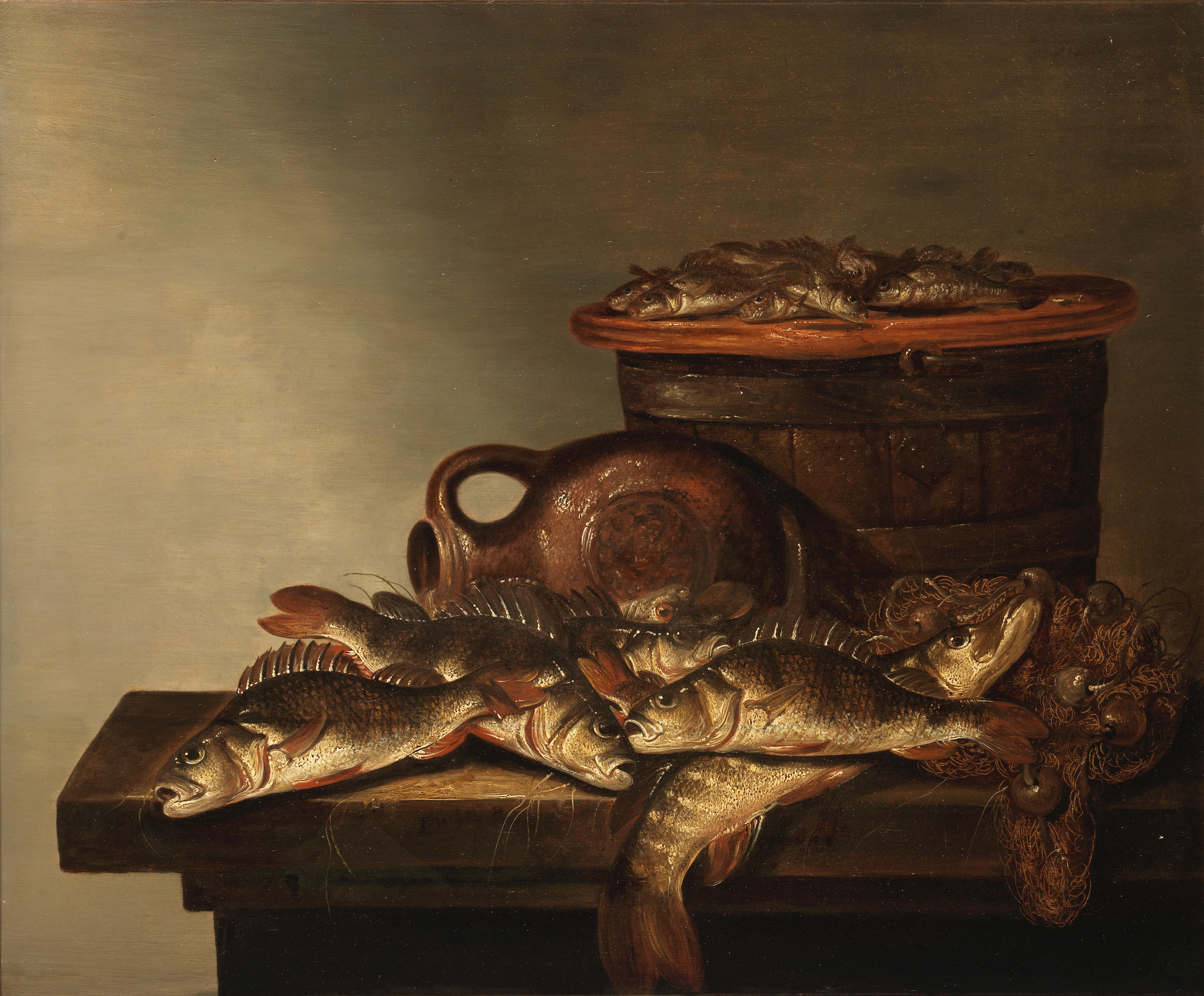
Fish, a fishing basket and net on a table-top

Pieter de Putter (Middelburg, c. 1600 – Beverwijk, buried on 20 November 1659) was a Dutch still life painter who was active in The Hague. He mainly painted fish still lifes, game pieces and still lifes with figures, De Putter was among the first generation of artists who specialized in fish still life paintings.

== Life ==
Pieter was born around 1600 in Middelburg, the son of Joost Joostensz. de Putter, a painter later registered at the Guild of Saint Luke of The Hague and of whom no surviving works are known. From 1605 Pieter and his family are recorded in The Hague. Pieter received his initial training from his father.

He married Maria van den Queborn in The Hague in 1626. His wife was the aunt of Anna van den Queborn who was married to the painter Abraham van Beijeren. De Putter may have been the source of van Beijeren's initial interest in the genre of fish still lifes as well as his tutor in this genre.

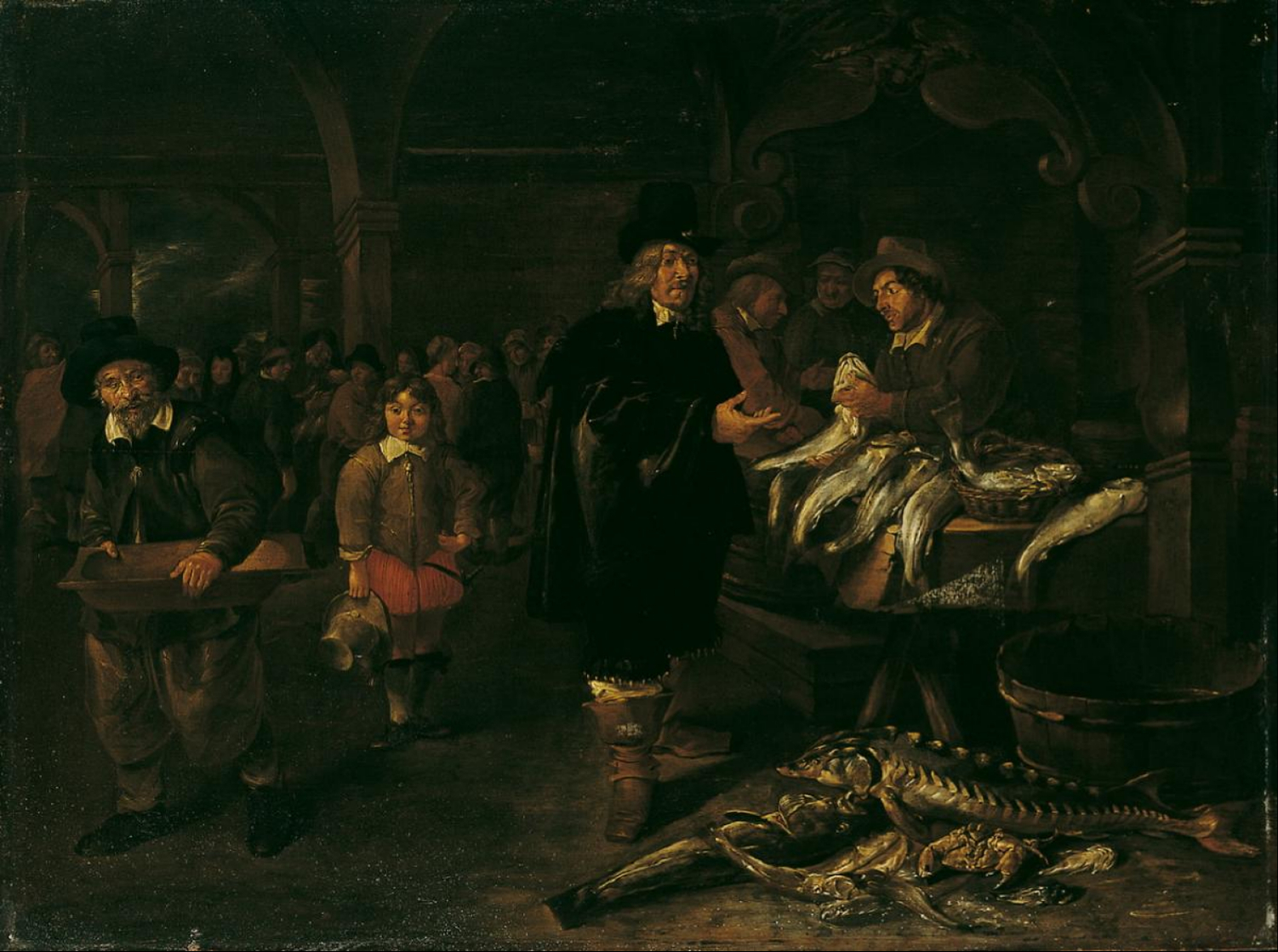
At the fishmonger's

He became a member of The Hague guild at an unknown date and was nominated as its deacon in 1639 and 1640 but was not elected. He was the master of Jacob Biltius (1633–1681), a painter of hunting still lives and trompe-l'œil scenes.

He moved to Beverwijk in 1658. Here he died and he was buried on 20 November 1659.

== Work ==
De Putter was a painter of fish still lifes, game pieces and still lifes with figures, He also painted some portraits and genre style paintings of fishermen and fish markets. He signed his works with a complex monogram consisting of the letters PDVTR, with the P drawn inside the D.

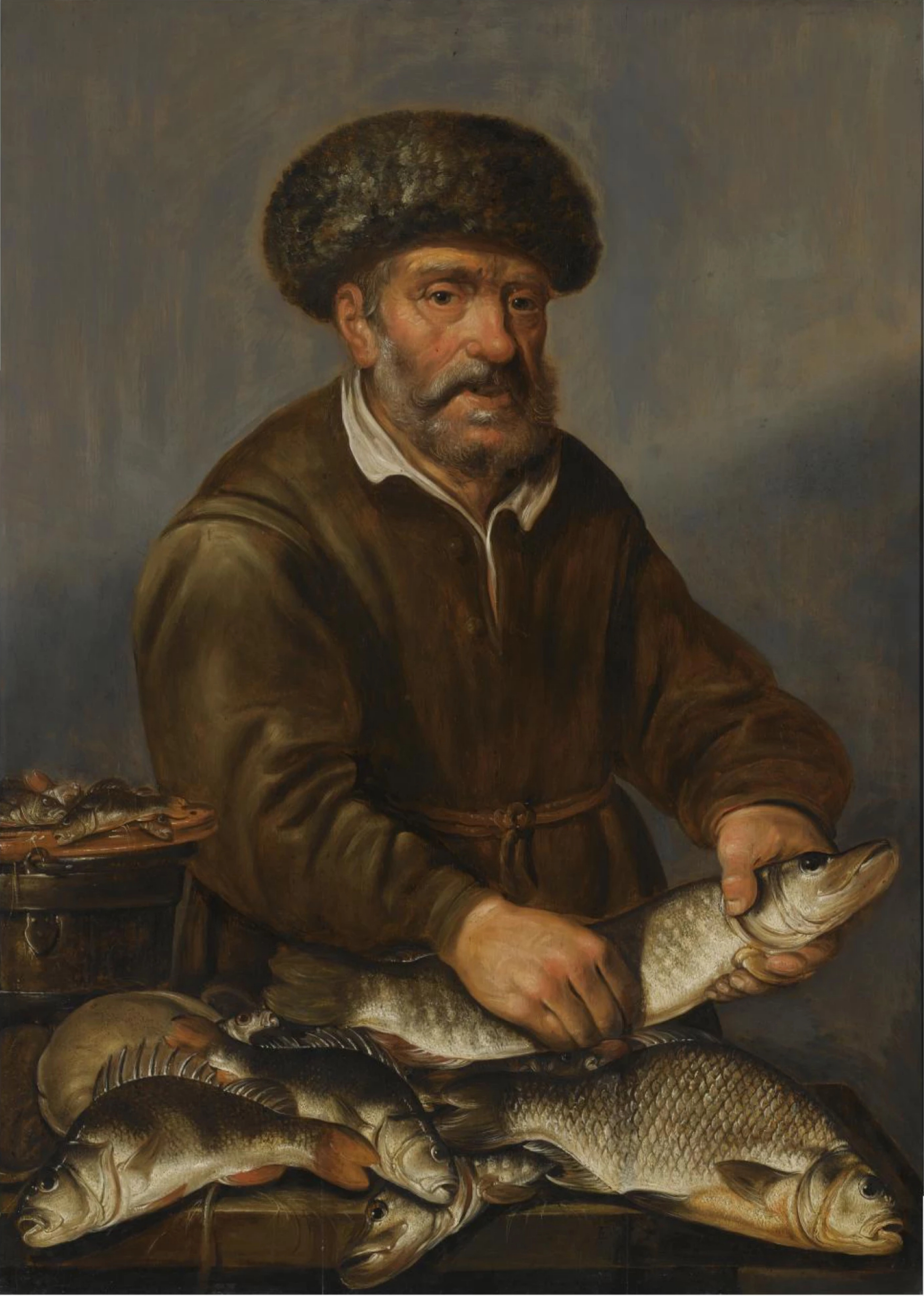
Fisherman holding a pike with other freshwater fish on a table

De Putter, Jan Dirven and Pieter van Schaeyenborch were among the first generation of artists who specialized in independent fish still life paintings, They had thus evolved away from the work of the earlier generation of Flemish and Dutch painters such as Pieter Aertsen and Joachim Beuckelaer who typically created fish still lifes as part of a larger market scene. De Putter was influential in this genre and had a number of followers, such as his nephew Abraham van Beijeren.

He painted almost exclusively freshwater fish. As freshwater fish are generally difficult to clean and not suitable for sale in the market, the fish in these still lifes are regarded not as food but as "game". This notion is emphasized through the inclusion in these compositions of nets and other fishing tools. There are four paintings known (at the RKD) in which a cat "watches" the fish.

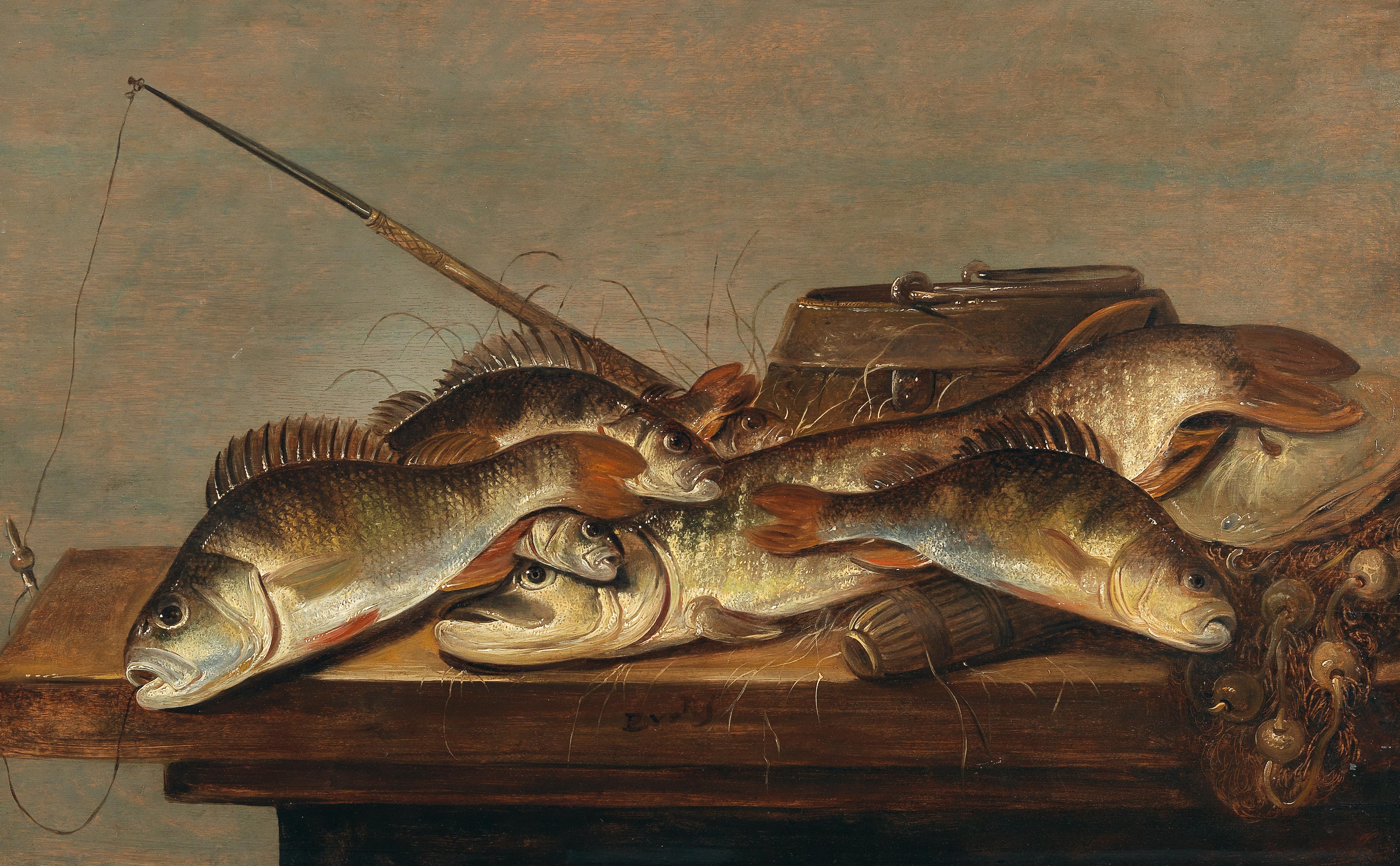
Still life with fish and fishing utensils on a table

De Putter also produced a number of works with fishermen and fishmongers with fish. These works typically depict men or women together with an extensive fish still life or in a barn.

De Putter painted a few still lifes of dead game (pheasant, duck or hare). In addition, he painted a number of portraits, in particular of his brother Pieter van Veen's family.

De Putter used a cool and monochrome palette, with a preference for brown, which he enlivened by highlighting the silver and white of the fish scales. The light is carefully observed and surface textures rendered with realism. These characteristics of his work show the influence of the Haarlem still life school of painters.
