= Alexander Coosemans =

Flemish painter (1627–1689)

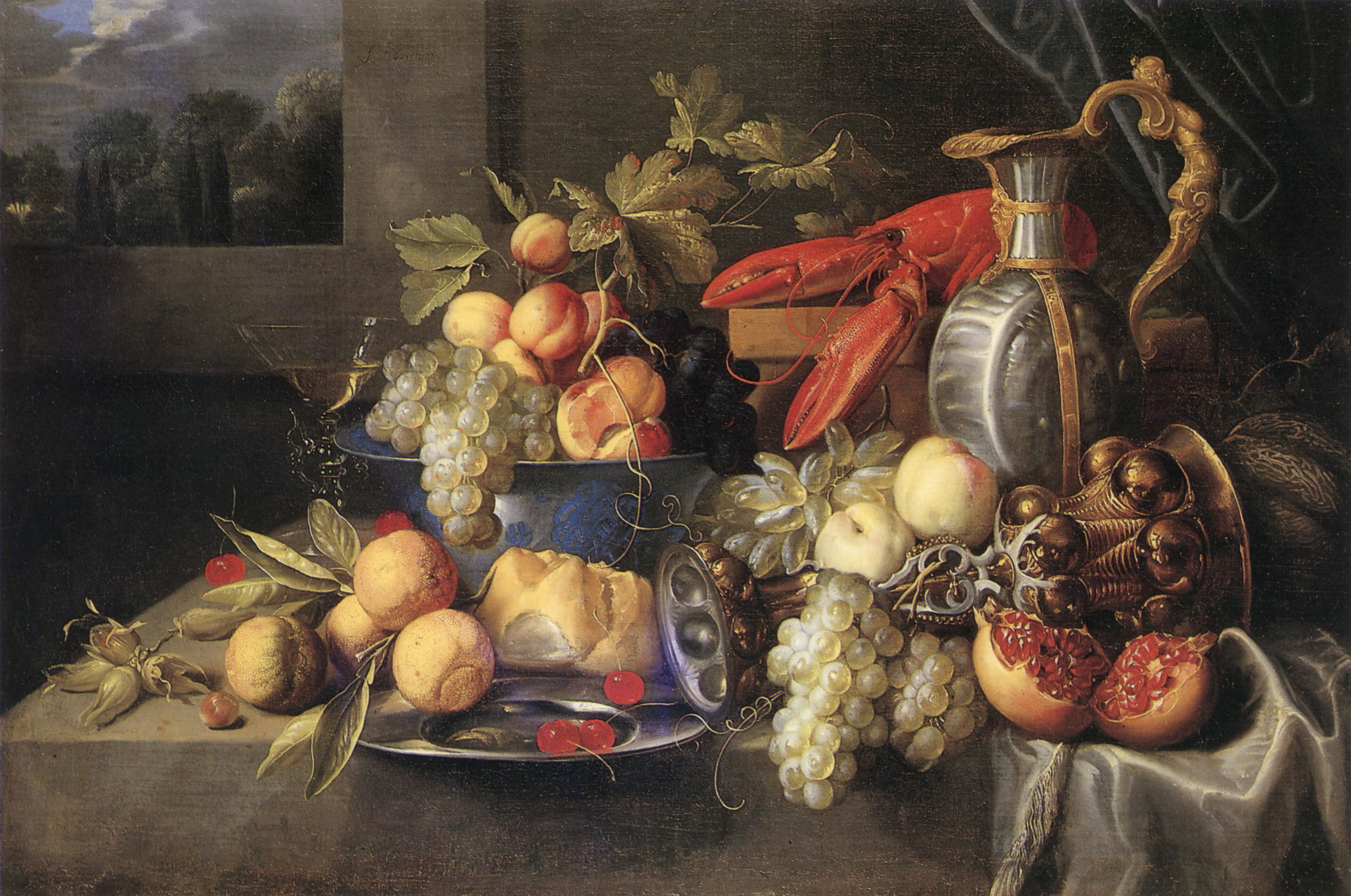
Still life with lobster and bread

Alexander Coosemans (Note: Name variations: Allicksander Cosmans and Alexander Cosmans) (1627–1689) was a Flemish Baroque painter specialized in still lifes of flower pieces, fruit, and inanimate subjects. He painted vanitas still lifes, pronkstillevens and game pieces.

== Life ==
Very little is known about the life of Coosemans. He was born and died in Antwerp, where he was baptized on 18 March 1627. His father was a carpenter from Brussels who had become a poorter of Antwerp in 1617. His mother was Geertruid Beeck. His father had a successful cloth trading business and could afford to send his son to a good teacher.

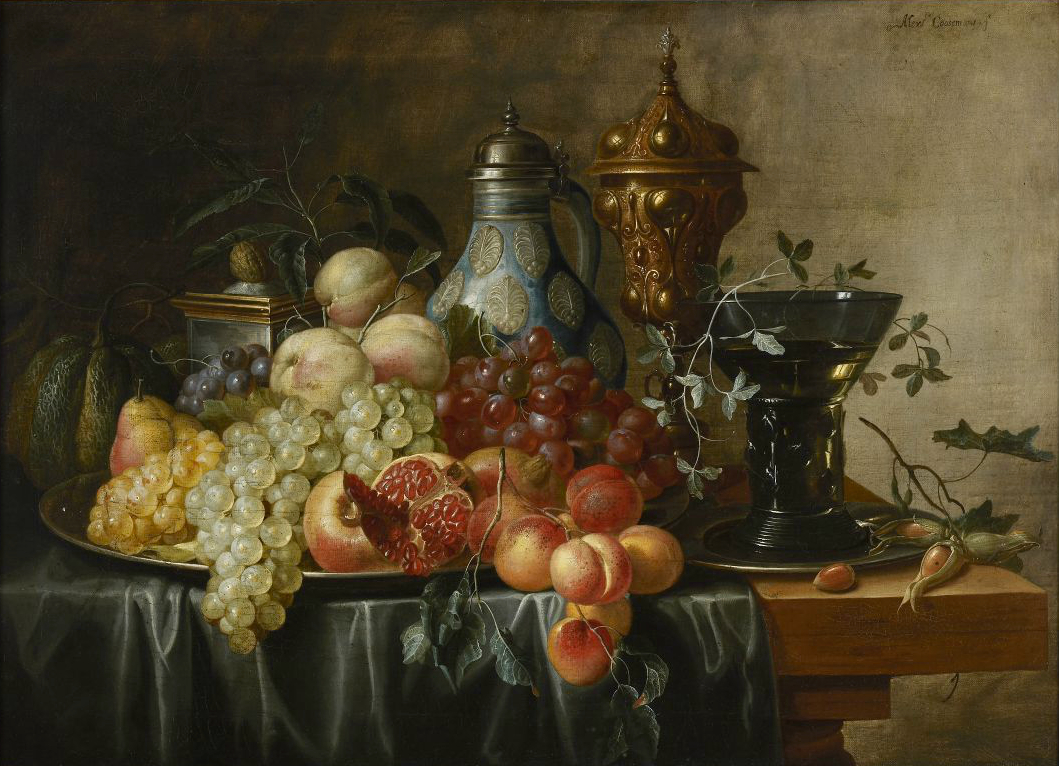
Still life with fruit

Coosemans became a pupil of Jan Davidsz de Heem, the leading still life painter in the Netherlands, in 1641. He became a master in the Guild of St. Luke of Antwerp in 1645.

He was in Italy between 1649 and 1651. Here he worked on commissions for the Doria-Pamphili-Landi and reportedly contributed still life elements of fruit and flowers for decorative paintings by Pasquale Chiesa in the Palazzo del Principe (also called 'villa di Andrea Doria') in Genoa and the Palazzo Doria Pamphilj in Rome.

Coosemans returned to Antwerp in 1651. He remained a bachelor and is believed to have resided in Antwerp until his death on 28 October 1689.

== Work ==
=== General ===
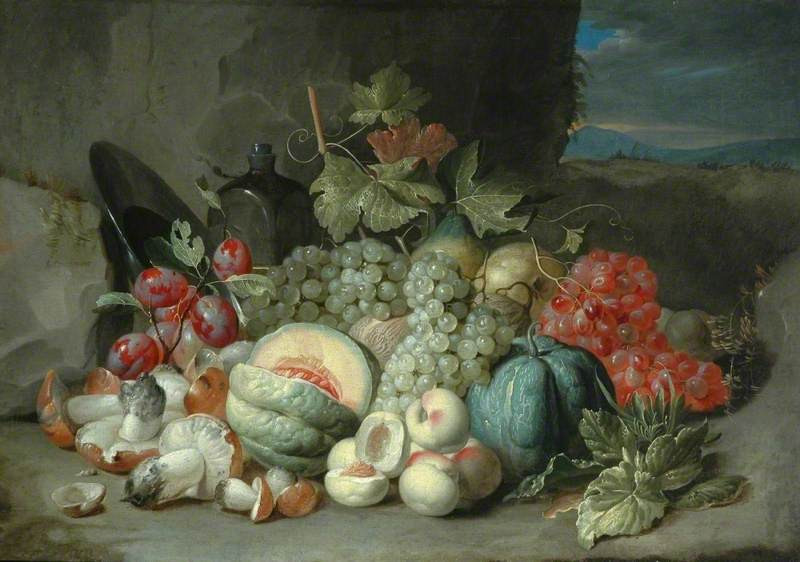
Fruit piece

Alexander Coosemans painted mainly flower pieces, fruit, and inanimate subjects. He also painted vanitas still lifes, pronkstillevens and game pieces. The only known dated work by his hand is a Still Life with Fruit and a Parrot, which is a work after de Heem (Phillips Auctioneers, London, 10 April 1990).

His still-life paintings are generally more varied and crowded than those of his master de Heem. He also preferred dramatic light effects in artificial settings which contrasts with de Heem's use of harmonious colour patterns and subtle tonalities to create an illusion of naturalness. His residence in Italy clearly influenced his style.

His style was followed by Hendrik Schoock.

=== Vanitas and pronkstillevens ===
A great number of Coosemans' still lifes can be characterized as 'vanitas' still lifes and 'pronkstillevens' (ostentatious still lifes). The still lifes are believed to carry a moralistic, hidden meaning.

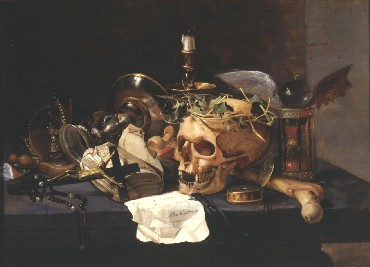
Vanitas

For instance, in the Still life on a partly draped table the various objects convey hidden meanings: the grapes and the glass of red wine refer to Christ and his blood, the bread references the Last Supper of Christ and the Christian communion and the silver vessel looks like a ciborium that holds the consecrated hosts during the Catholic Mass. The crabs, just like the lobsters in his other still lifes, refer to the Christian belief in the resurrection of Christ since these crustaceans must, in order to grow, lose their carapace and start a new life. The partly peeled lemon stands for the various stages of human life and its vulnerability and suffering.

=== Collaborations ===
As was common in 17th-century Antwerp, Coosemans regularly collaborated with other artists. There are some collaborations with him on so-called 'garland paintings'. Garland paintings are a type of still life invented in Antwerp and whose earliest practitioner was Jan Brueghel the Elder. These paintings typically show a flower garland around a devotional image or portrait. Garland paintings were usually collaborations between a still life and a figure painter.

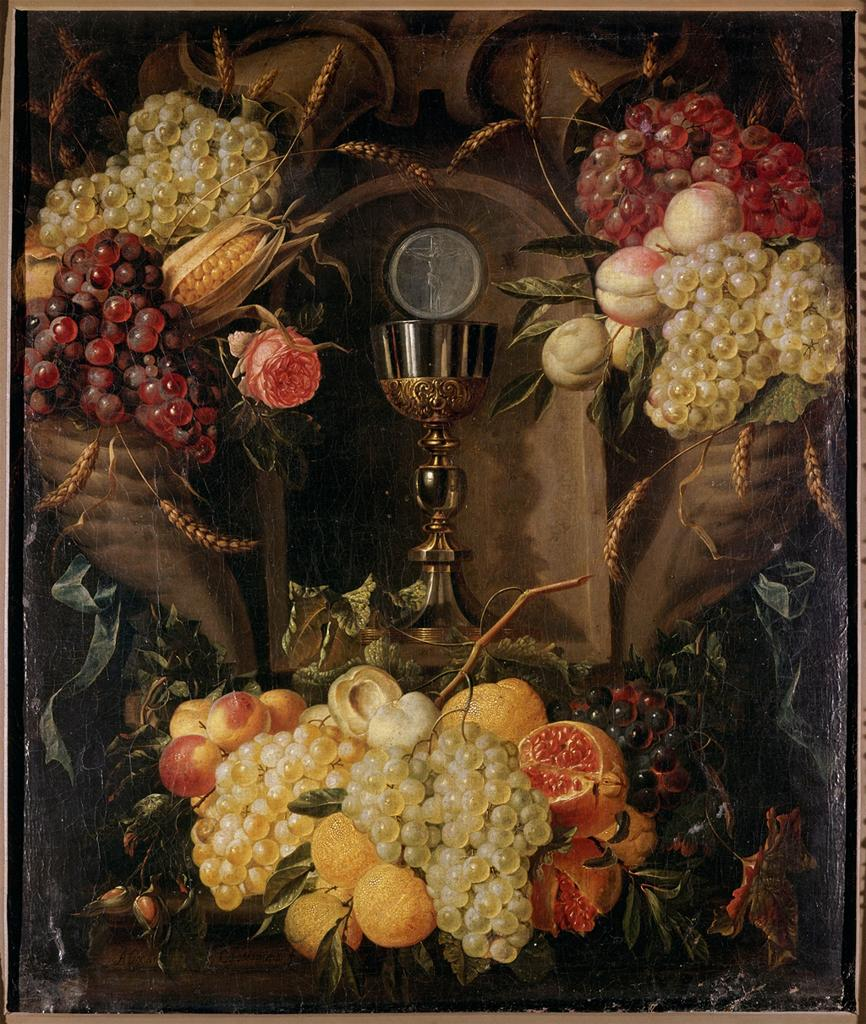
Allegory of the Eucharist

A number of garland paintings are known in which Coosemans painted the flower or fruit garland surrounding a cartouche with a depiction of a bust, crucifix or other religious symbol. An example is A sculpted bust in a niche surrounded with swags of fruit (Christie's on 1 April 2008 in Amsterdam, lot 151) of which it is not known who the collaborating artist is. Another example of this genre is the Fruits surrounding a niche with a crucifix (Cornette de Saint Cyr, Bertrand, -10-25 October 2013, Paris). These garland paintings often carry religious meanings. For instance in the Allegory of the Eucharist (Musée de Tessé, Le Mans) the garland painted by Coosemans around a ciborium with the host includes many symbolic elements: a cornucopia symbolizes the bounty of creation and the providence of god, the stalks of wheat and the grapes are a reference to the Christian communion during which bread and wine are consumed while the pomegranate and the quince are symbols of plenty as well as of fertility and immortality.

Another collaborative effort of Coosemans is the composition Double Portrait of a boy and a girl as Cupid and Ceres next to a Still life of fruits and flowers (Sotheby's on 28 January 2010 in New York, lot 279). His collaborator was Theodoor van Thulden who painted the staffage.
