= Pieter van Noort =

Dutch painter

- Born: 1622; Leiden
- Died: 1672 (aged 49–50); Zwolle
- Occupation: Painter
- Known for: Still life paintings of fish

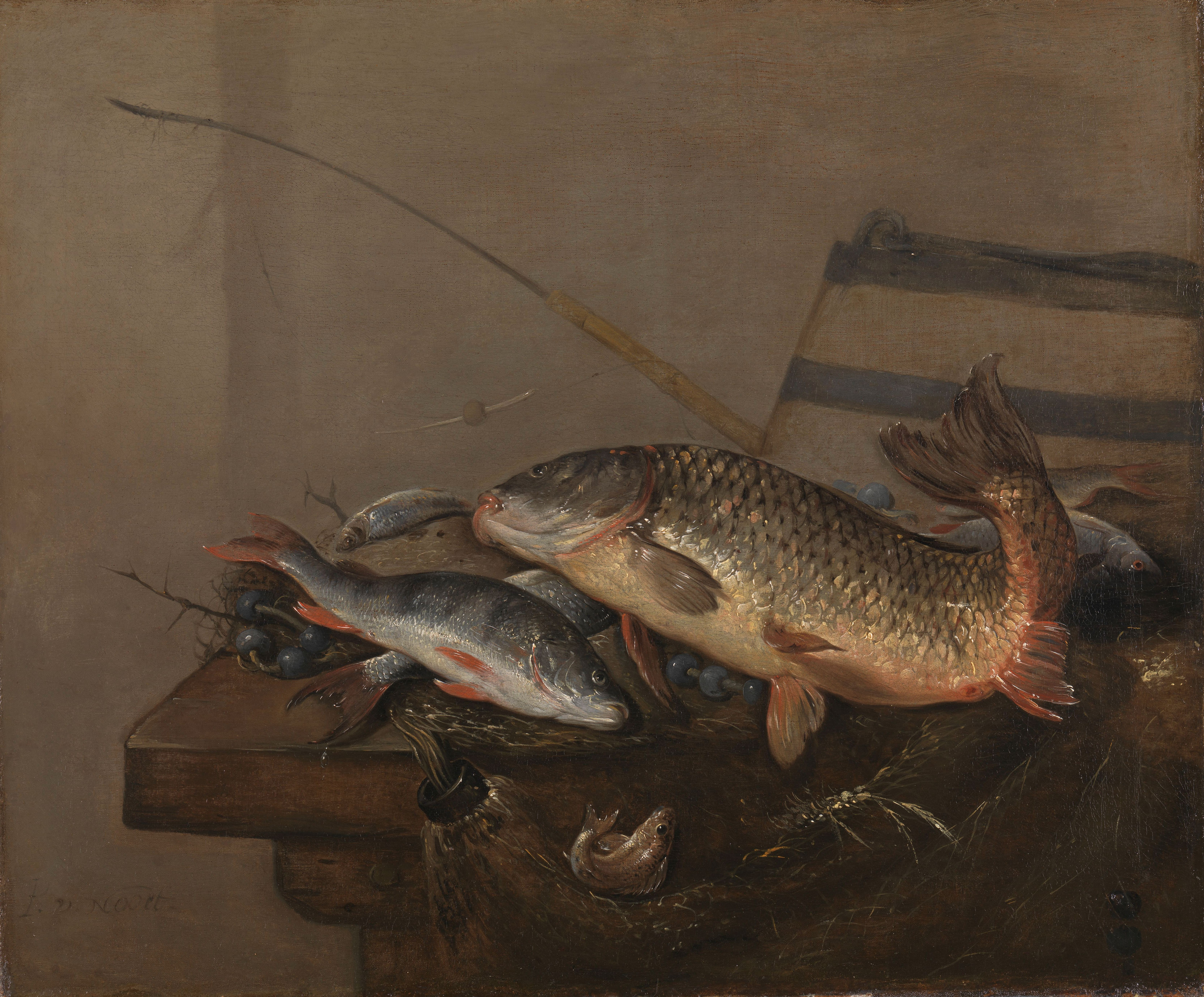
Still life with fish

Pieter van Noort (1622 – 1672) was a Dutch painter of still lifes, often featuring fish.

He was born in Leiden as the son of Derck van Noort, and was not, as some sources claim, the son of Pieter van Noort (ca. 1592 - after 1634). From 1648 he was registered as a member of the Leiden Guild of St. Luke. He was followed by Isaac van Duynen. He moved in 1652 to Zwolle, where he later died.

His work can be found in the following collections:

- Rijksmuseum, Amsterdam
- Dordrechts Museum, Dordrecht
- Mauritshuis, Den Haag
- Museum De Fundatie, Zwolle
