= Peter Willebeeck =

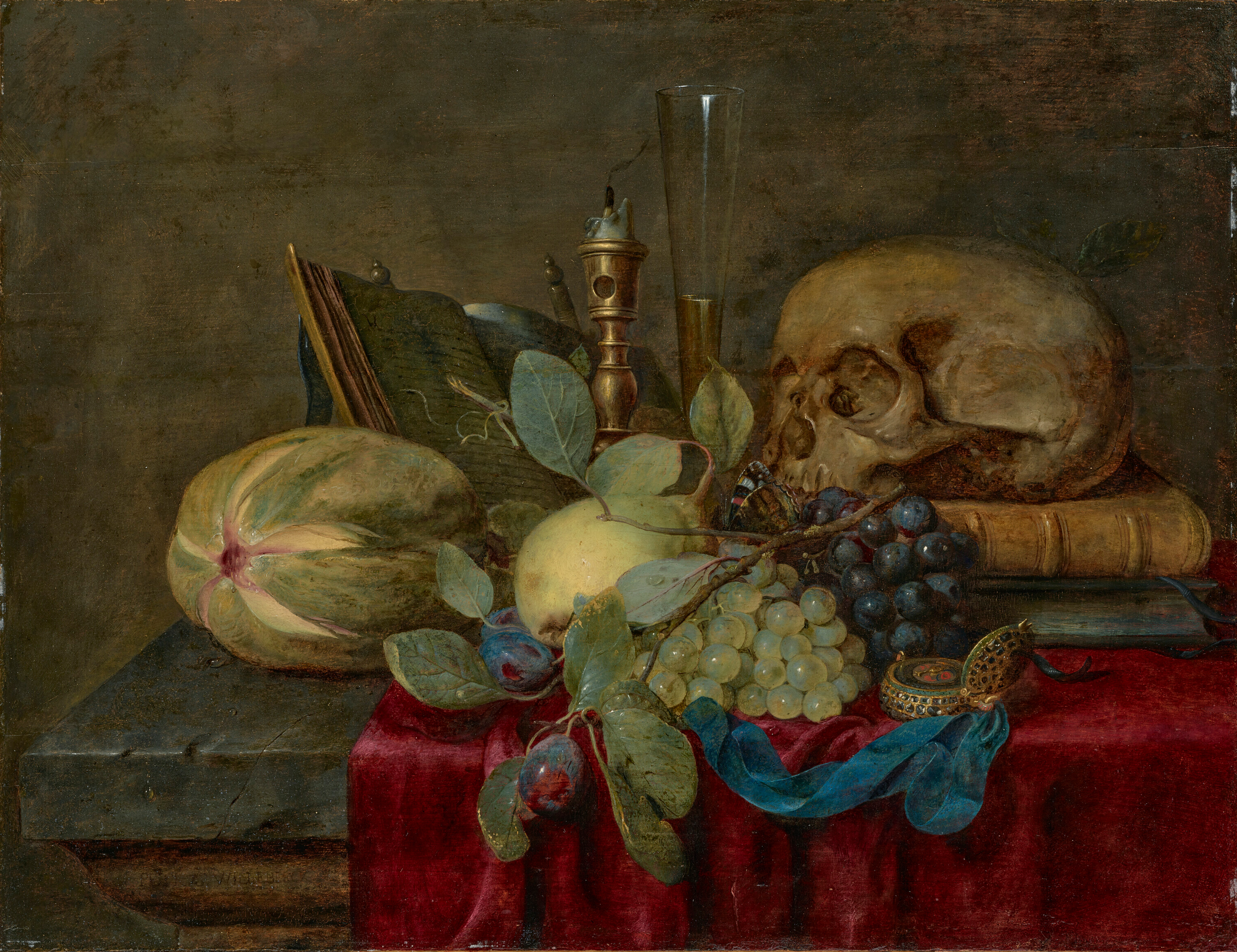
Vanitas with fruit, books, pocket watch, wine glass, extinguished candle and skull

Peter Willebeeck or Petrus Willebeeck (fl. 1632–1648) was a Flemish still life painter who was active in Antwerp in the second quarter of the 17th century. He is known for his fruit still lifes, vanitas still lifes, pronkstillevens and banquet pieces executed in a very delicate manner.

== Life ==
Virtually nothing is recorded about Willebeeck's life and training. It is believed he was born in Antwerp in 1625. He was the son of Peeter Willebeeck (I), town clerk of Antwerp, and the brother of Balthasar Willebeeck (? - 1651), who was also a painter. He was registered at the Antwerp Guild of Saint Luke in the guild year 1632/33 as a pupil of Eduwaerd (Eduard) Snayers, a little-known painter and brother of the better known painter Peter Snayers. He became a master of the same guild in the guild year 1647/48. The long period between his registrations respectively as a pupil and as a master suggest he may have traveled to another city or abroad for further study.

He was the teacher of Pieter Cosijn, a 17 year old orphan from The Hague who had been sent to study with Willebeeck by the Orphanage of The Hague. Under the contract the Orphanage agreed to pay a certain sum for the living expenses of the pupil and an additional annual sum for his tuition. The first payment was made to Willebeeck on 28 July 1648. In December 1648 Balthasar Willebeeck received on behalf of his brother a payment under the contract for the tuition received by Pieter Cosijn. This payment seems to suggest that at that time Cosijn had already left Willebeeck's workshop and returned to The Hague.

== Work ==
Willebeeck painted fruit still lifes, vanitas still lives, pronkstillevens and banquet pieces. The only dated work by his hand is a fruit still life dated 1647, which depicts a fruit garland around a bust of Christ in grisaille. This painting was originally at the Harrach Gallery in Vienna and was last auctioned on 18 January 1983 at Christie's New York. Willebeeck is regarded as a member of the circle of Flemish painters who were influenced by Jan Davidsz de Heem, a Dutch still life painter who was active in Antwerp at the same time as Willebeeck and had himself been influenced by Flemish still life painters such as Frans Snyders and Daniel Seghers.

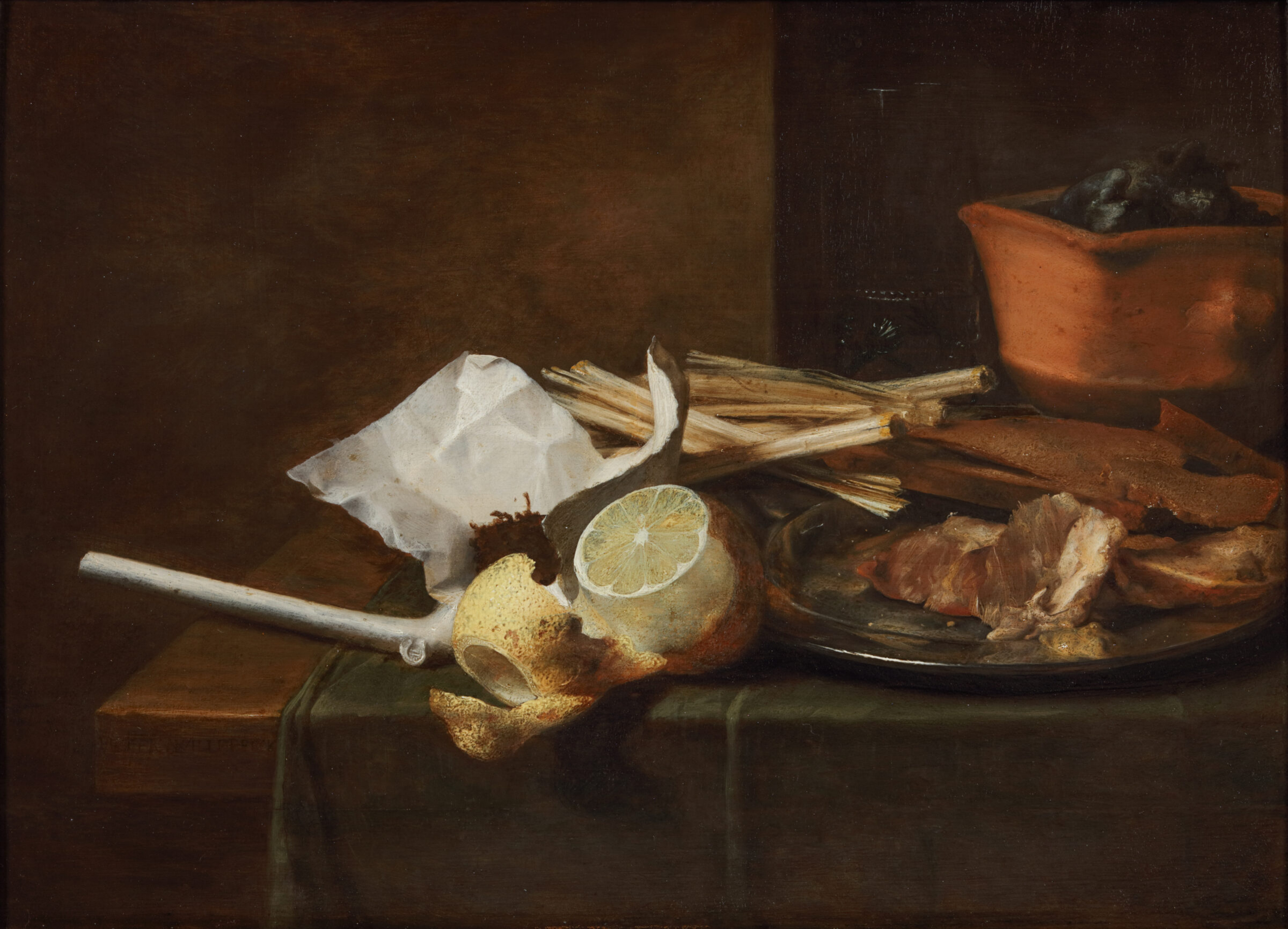
Still Life with Lemon, Pipe and Bread

Many of his still lifes reference the theme of vanitas and the transience of earthly glory and pleasure. Vanitas still lifes were very popular in Flanders and the Dutch Republic during the 17th century. These still lifes depict various objects which evoke the transitory nature of mankind's earthly aspirations and undertakings, the role of chance in life and the brevity and apparent lack of meaning and purpose of life. These philosophical notions are expressed through stock symbols such as skulls, empty wine glasses, extinguished candles, empty shells, soap bulbs, wilted flowers, dead animals, smoking utensils, clocks, mirrors, books, dice, playing cards, hourglasses, musical instruments and scores, painter's tools and various expensive or exclusive objects such as jewelry, fine tableware and rare shells. The term vanitas is derived from the famous line Vanitas, Vanitas. Et omnia Vanitas in the Vulgate translation of the book of Ecclesiastes in the Bible. In the King James Version this line is translated as "Vanity of vanities, all is vanity".

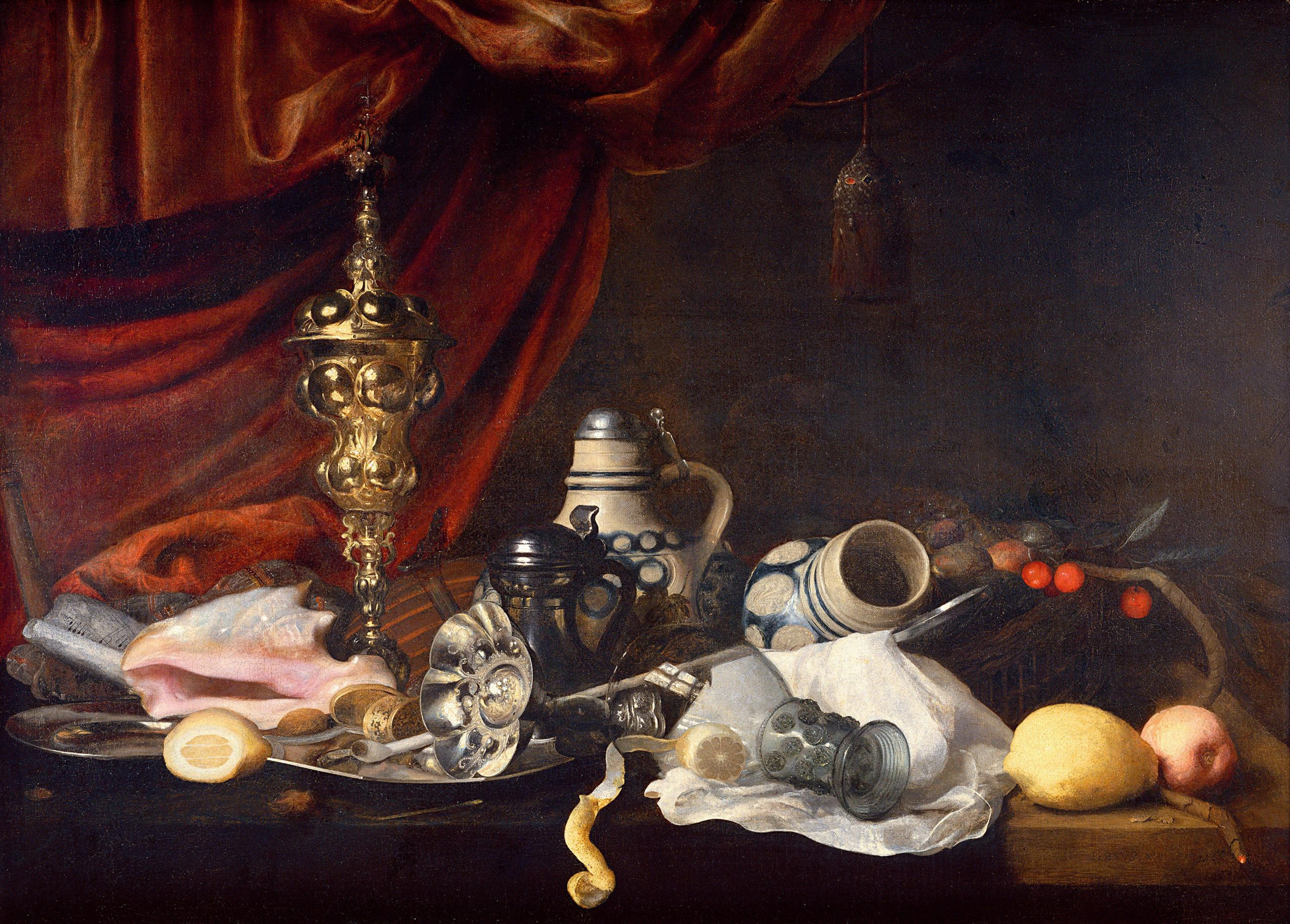
Vanitas still life, Snijders&Rockox House

Vanitas paintings are informed by a Christian understanding of the world as a temporary place of ephemeral pleasures and torments from which humanity's only hope of escape is through the sacrifice and resurrection of Christ. While most of the symbols in vanitas still lifes reference earthly accomplishments (books, scientific instruments, etc.), pleasures (a pipe), sorrows (symbolised by a peeled lemon), death and the transience of life (skulls, soap bubbles, empty shells) and the role of chance in life (dice, playing cards), some symbols used in these paintings carry a dual meaning: a rose or an oar of grain refers as much to the brevity of life as it is a symbol of the resurrection of Christ and thus eternal life. An illustration of a vanitas painting by Willebeeck is in the collection of the Snijders&Rockox House in Antwerp. It shows precious objects to refer to ideas of vanities and hollowness: the fallen rummer, the silver candle holder, tazza and Westerwald jug are all empty, the lighted cigar is about to go out, the pipe is finished and there is no further life in the shell. These objects all point to the transitory nature of the luxuries and the pleasures enjoyed in life. The peeled lemon references the bitterness of life. Another vanitas still life by Willebeeck is the Vanitas with fruit, books, pocket watch, wine glass, extinguished candle and skull. It is full of vanitas symbols and may have served as the model for a similar painting by the Antwerp painter Joris van Son dated 1652.

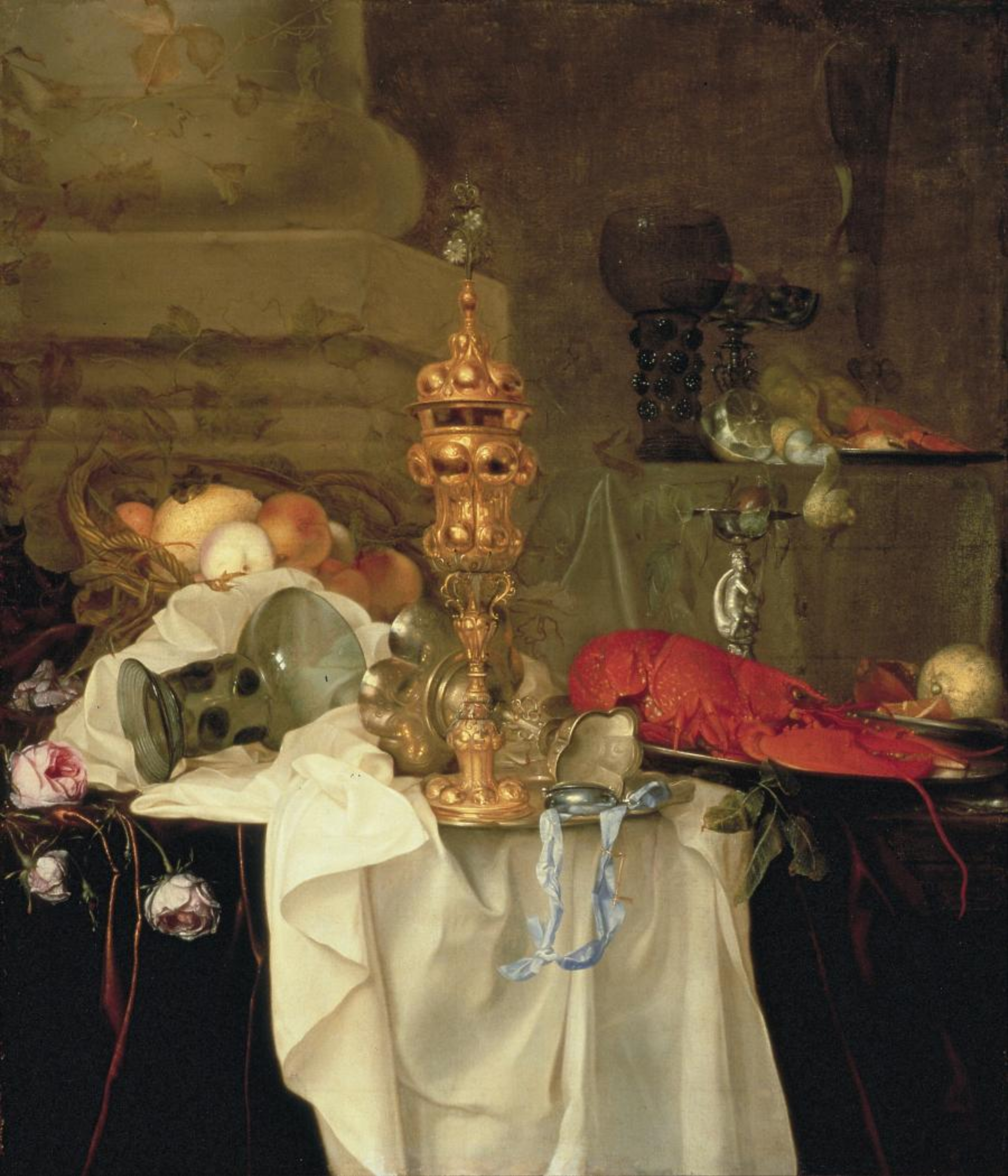
Pronkstilleven

Some of the elaborate still lifes by Willebeeck fall in the category of pronkstillevens, the sumptuous still lifes that were popular in Flanders and the Dutch Republic from the 1640s. These pictures accentuate overwhelming abundance by depicting a diversity of precious objects, fruits, flowers, and dead game, in some cases in combination with human and animal figures.

As was common in Antwerp at the time, Willebeeck collaborated with other painters, who were specialists in a particular genre. He worked with staffage specialists on still lifes and portraits. One example of such collaboration is a painting of a garland of fruit around a female bust which he made with Erasmus Quellinus II who painted the female figure (Christie's, New York City, 26 January 2001, lot 107, not sold).
