= Jan Theunisz Blanckerhoff =

Dutch painter

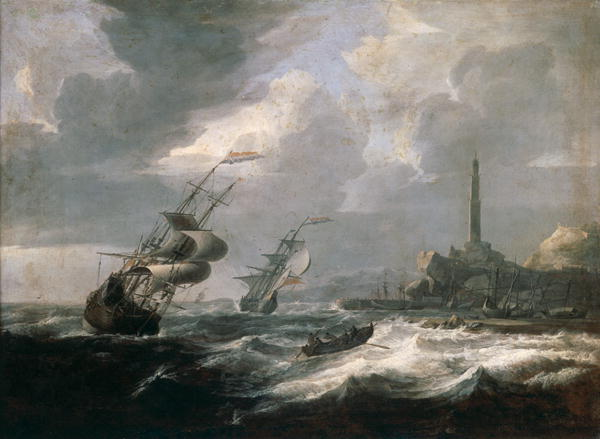
Seascape with lighthouse of Genoa.

Jan Theunisz Blanckerhoff or Jan Maat, (10 January 1628, Alkmaar – buried 2 October 1669, Amsterdam) was a Dutch Golden Age marine painter.

== Biography ==
He was taught by the Alkmaar painter Arent Teerling, and later by Pieter Scheyenburg and still later again by Cesar van Everdingen, who encouraged him to travel. He became a member of the Bentvueghels in Rome and was given the bent name Jan Maat. He started on landscapes but switched to seascapes.

According to Houbraken, his most popular pieces were of Italian ports with strange boats moored here. He had a student, Arnout Smit, in Amsterdam, who followed his style.
