= Pronkstilleven =

17th-century still-life painting sub-genre

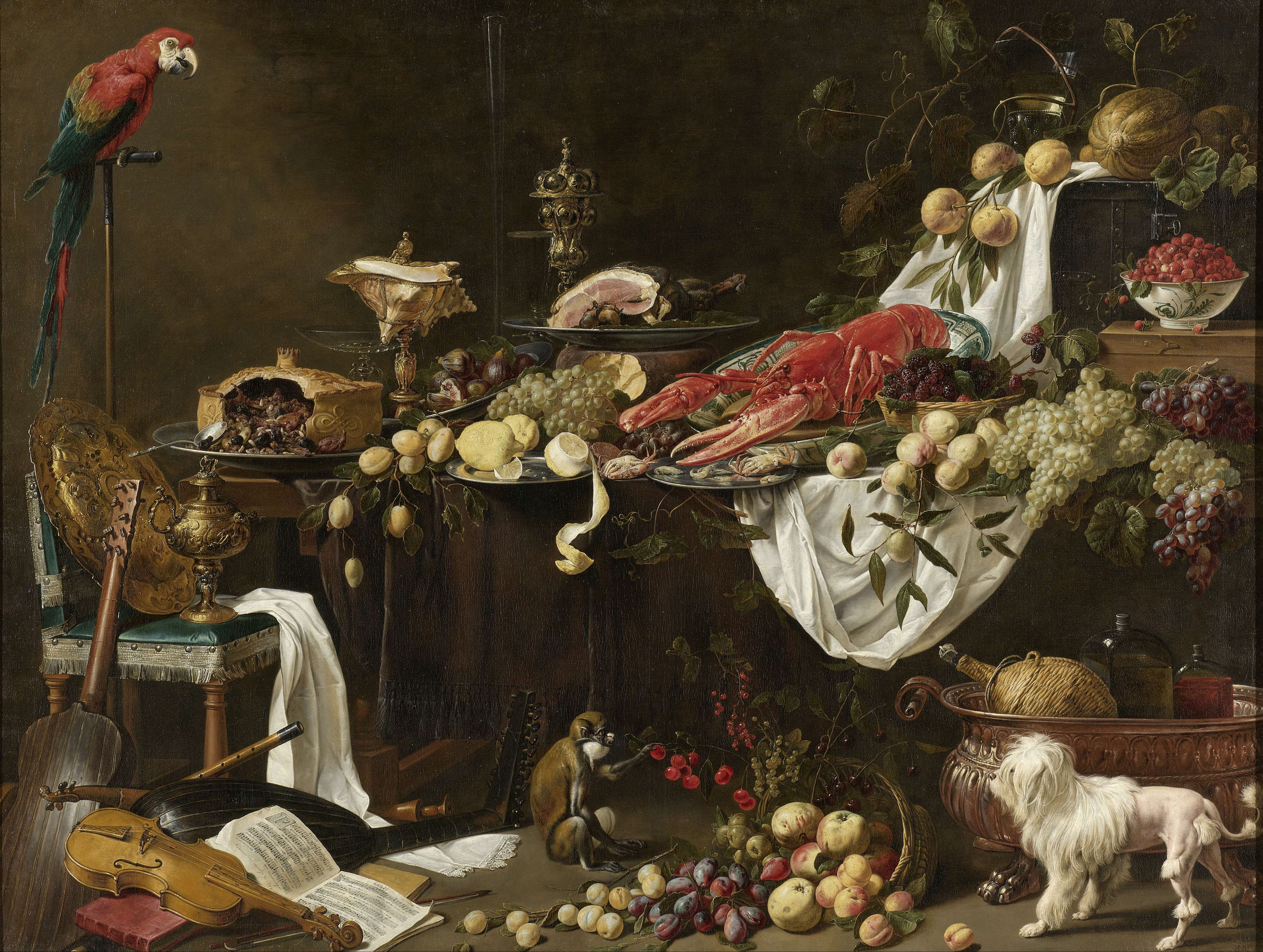
Pronkstilleven by Adriaen van Utrecht, 1644

Pronkstilleven (Dutch for 'ostentatious', 'ornate' or 'sumptuous' still life) is a style of ornate still life painting, characterised by large and complex compositions and an elaborate palette. Pronkstillevens typically depict a wide variety of objects, fruits, flowers and inanimate animals, often accompanied by live human and animal figures. The genre was developed in the 1640s in Antwerp from where it spread quickly to the Dutch Republic.

== Development ==
Flemish artists such as Frans Snyders and Adriaen van Utrecht started to paint still lifes that emphasized abundance by depicting a diversity of objects, fruits, flowers and dead game, often together with living people and animals.

The style was soon adopted by artists from the Dutch Republic. A leading Dutch representative was Jan Davidsz. de Heem, who spent a long period of his active career in Antwerp and was one of the founders of the style in the Dutch Republic. Other leading representatives in Flanders and the Dutch Republic were Nicolaes van Verendael, Alexander Coosemans, Carstian Luyckx, Jasper Geeraards, Peter Willebeeck, Abraham van Beyeren and Willem Kalf.

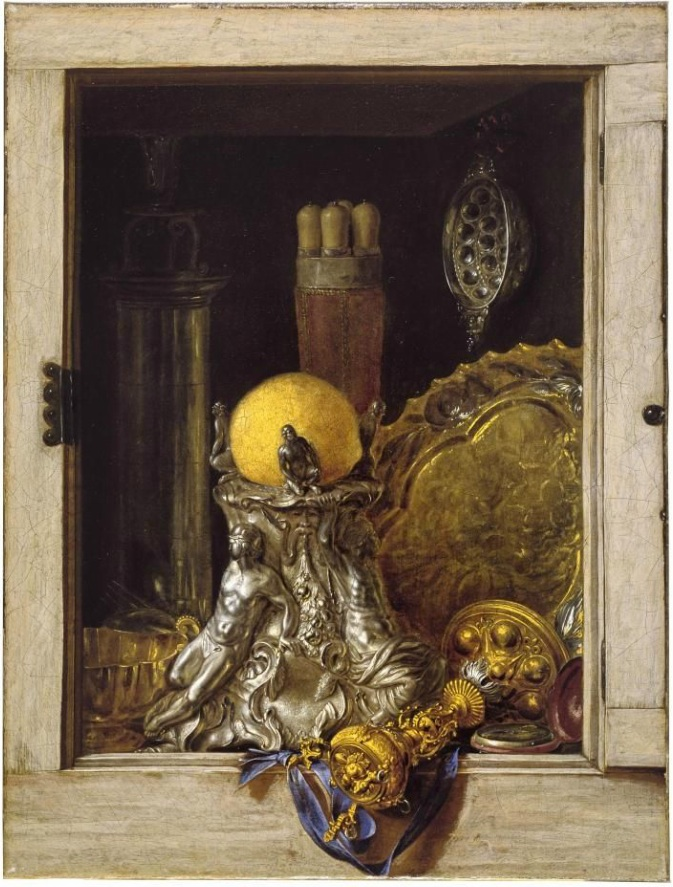
Silverware in an Open Cabinet by Cornelis Norbertus Gijsbrechts

Cornelis Norbertus Gijsbrechts developed the style further by incorporating pronkstillevens in the trompe-l'œil compositions for which he was known. An example is his Silverware in an Open Cabinet at the Museum of Fine Arts, Ghent.

== Meaning ==
Pronkstillevens are usually interpreted as a form of vanitas painting that conveys a moral lesson. The various objects in the compositions serve as symbols that can be read as an admonition or a life lesson. The objects usually refer to the transience and emptiness of wealth and possessions and the ultimate extinction and emptiness of earthly life.

For instance, roses are often used as a vanitas motif, as they recall that all life and earthly beauty are fleeting. Hourglasses are an admonition that life is fleeting and will end. Empty containers such as glasses or vases point to the emptiness of earthly wealth and aspirations. The paintings remind the viewer of the need to practice moderation and temperance.
