= Abraham van Beijeren =

Dutch painter and drafter (c.1620–1690)

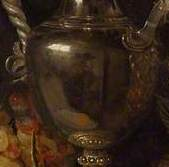
- Still Life with a silver Wine-jar and a reflected Portrait of the Artist, unknown date
- Born: Abraham Hendriksz van Beijere c. 1620; The Hague, Dutch Republic
- Died: March 1690; Overschie, Dutch Republic
- Occupations: Painter; drafter
- Style: Pronkstilleven
- Spouses: Emmerentia Stercke (m. 1639; died 1647); Anna van den Queborn (m. 1647; died 1689)
- Children: 4

Abraham Hendriksz van Beijeren (Note: Also cited as Abraham van Beyeren.)(c. 1620 – March 1690) was a Dutch painter and drafter. Little recognized in his day, Van Beijeren is considered one of the most important painters of pronkstilleven style still lifes.

== Life ==
Van Beijeren was born around 1620 in The Hague to Hendrick Gillisz van Beyeren, a painter, and Anneke Dircxz. In 1636, Van Beijeren began training under Tyman Arentsz. Cracht. Settling in Leiden in 1638, the following year Van Beijeren married his first wife Emmerentia Stercke the following year. Returning to The Hague in 1640, the couple had three daughters before Stercke\s death in 1647.

On 3 February 1647, Van den Queborn married the still life painter Anna van den Queborn with whom he had at least one son, Bredius, who died in infancy. Van den Queborn was the daughter of the portrait painter and engraver Crispijn van den Queborn, the paternal granddaughter of the painter Daniël van den Queborn, and the niece of the painter Pieter de Putter. De Putter may have been the source of van Beijeren's initial interest in the genre of fish still lifes as well as his tutor in this genre. Van Beijeren's initial works were marine and fish still life paintings. These were not very well paid at the time and the relative poverty of Van Beijeren may explain his frequent moves from one place to another. He resided in Delft from 1657 where he joined the local Guild of Saint Luke. In 1663 he returned to The Hague where he remained until 1669 when he moved to Amsterdam. Further moves followed: to Alkmaar in 1669, then Gouda in 1675 and finally Overschie (Rotterdam) in 1677. This was his last home.

The artist may have been doing better financially in his later years as he was able to buy a house in Overschie for 1,000 guilders of which 600 was covered by a mortgage. Van den Queborn likely died in 1689, presumably in Overschie. Van Beijeren died in Overschie in 1690.

== Work ==
Van Beijeren signed his canvases with the monogram AVB and invariably failed to include a date. As a result, it has been difficult to compile a precise chronology of his works. While in the 1640s most of his paintings were seascapes, van Beijeren began to develop as a skilled still life painter of fish. In his early marine paintings he shows the influence of Jan van Goyen.

In the 1650s and 1660s he started to focus on pronkstillevens, i.e. still lifes with fine silverware, Chinese porcelain, glass and selections of fruit. He also painted a number of floral still life paintings, dead bird paintings and vanitas paintings. The move to painting pronkstillevens may have been motivated by economic necessity as they could be sold to a wealthier clientele. These still lifes are often quite elaborate displays and show the influence of Jan Davidsz. de Heem.

He generally used a fairly broad technique and brown tonalities with some precision of detail. Van Beijeren was likely familiar with the other Dutch painters of pronkstillevens such as Pieter Claesz and Willem Claeszoon Heda who were specialists in monochrome banquet still lives. He often worked on a larger scale than his Dutch contemporaries with his tall canvasses reaching a height of one meter.

== Collections ==
The Scottish National Gallery, the Academy of Fine Arts Vienna, the Ashmolean Museum (University of Oxford), the Iris & B. Gerald Cantor Center for Visual Arts (Stanford University, California), the Cleveland Museum of Art, the Dallas Museum of Art, the Detroit Institute of Arts, Museum de Fundatie, the Honolulu Museum of Art, the Los Angeles County Museum of Art, the Louvre, the Metropolitan Museum of Art, the Minneapolis Institute of Arts, the National Maritime Museum (Greenwich, UK), the York Art Gallery, York, UK; the Philadelphia Museum of Art, the Rijksmuseum Amsterdam, the Royal Museums of Fine Arts of Belgium, the Rhode Island School of Design Museum, the Royal Castle in Warsaw and the Seattle Art Museum are some of the public collections that hold paintings by Abraham van Beyeren. In private collections: Ger Eenens Collection the Netherlands.

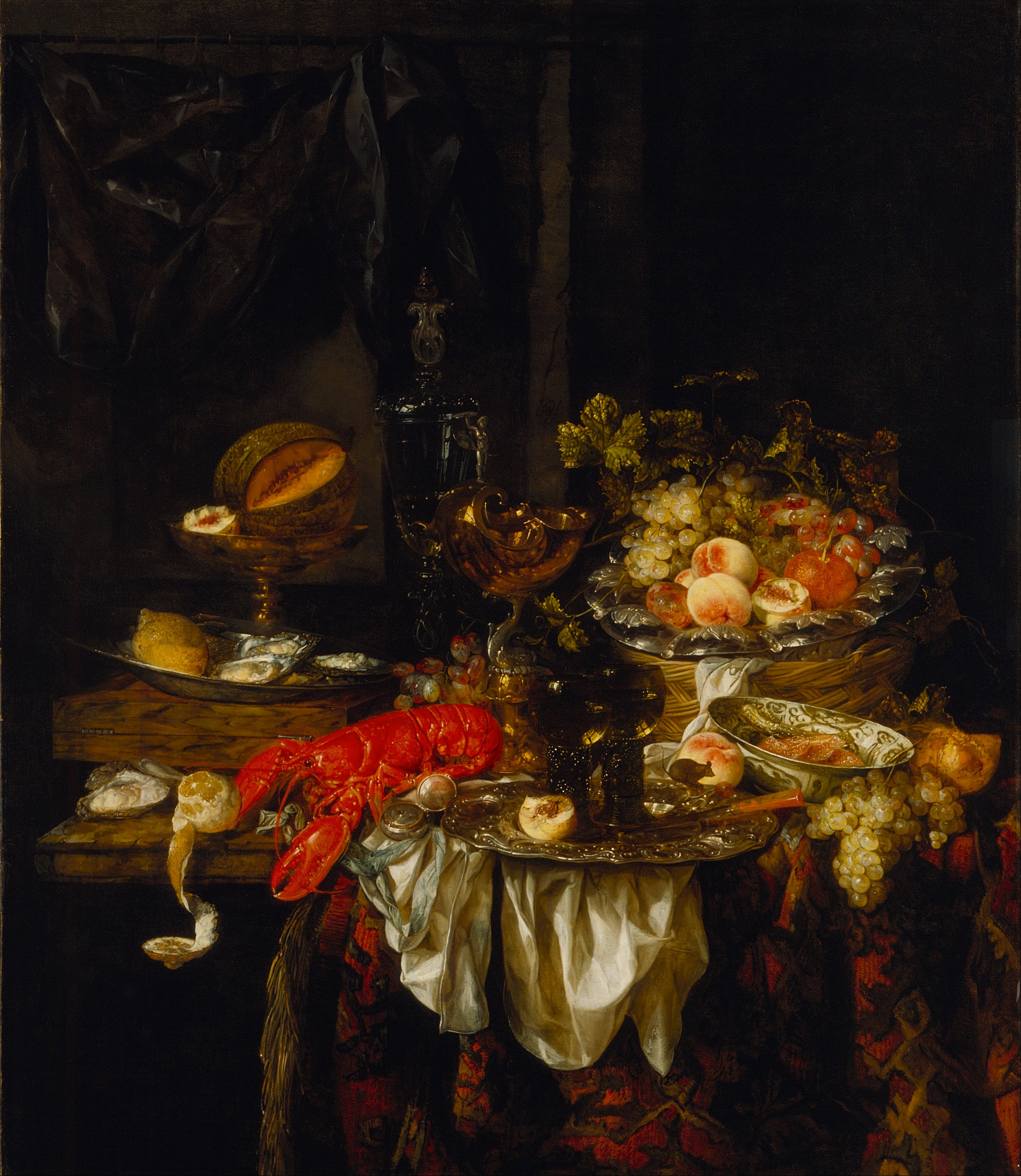
Banquet still life

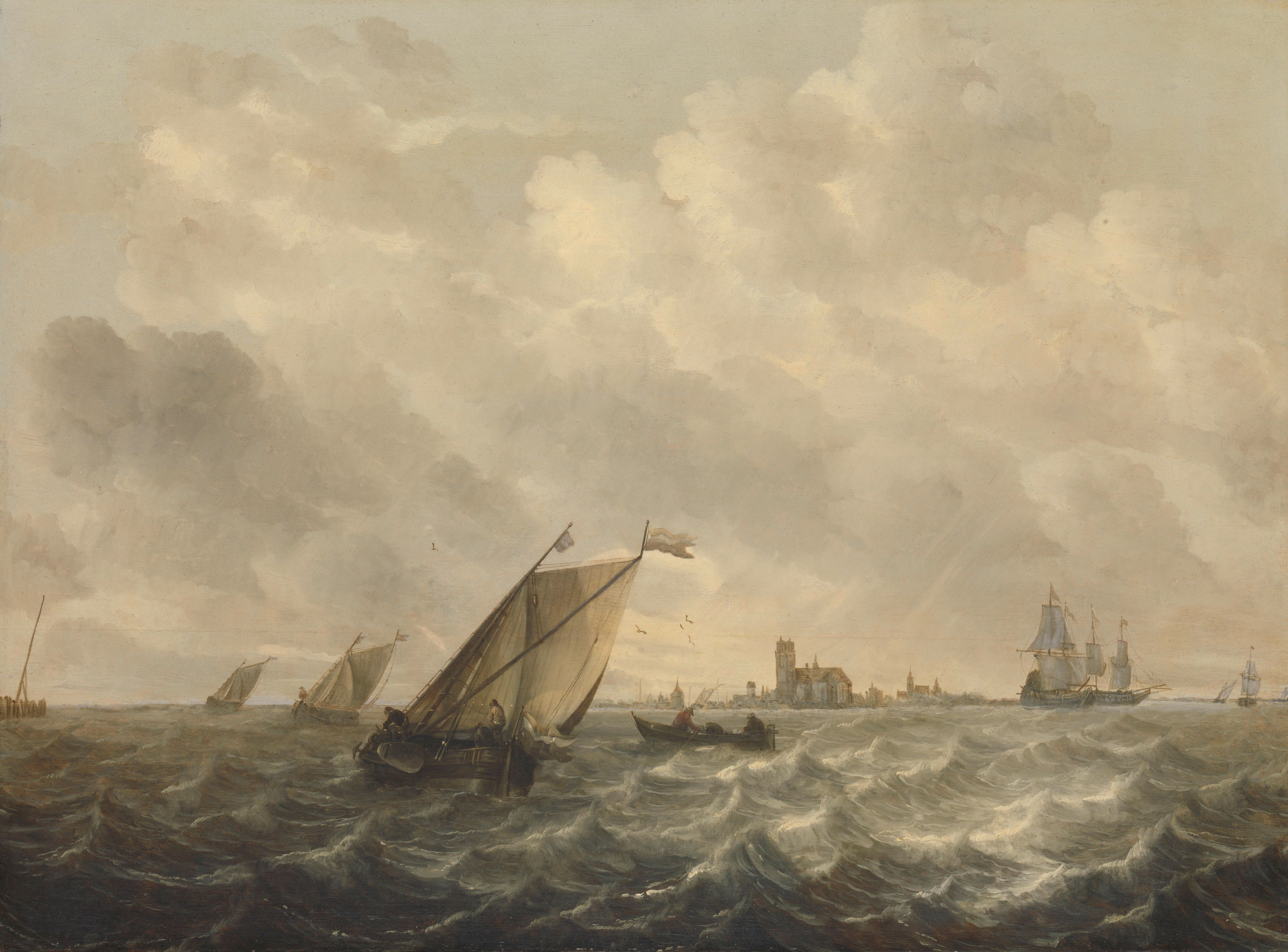
River view

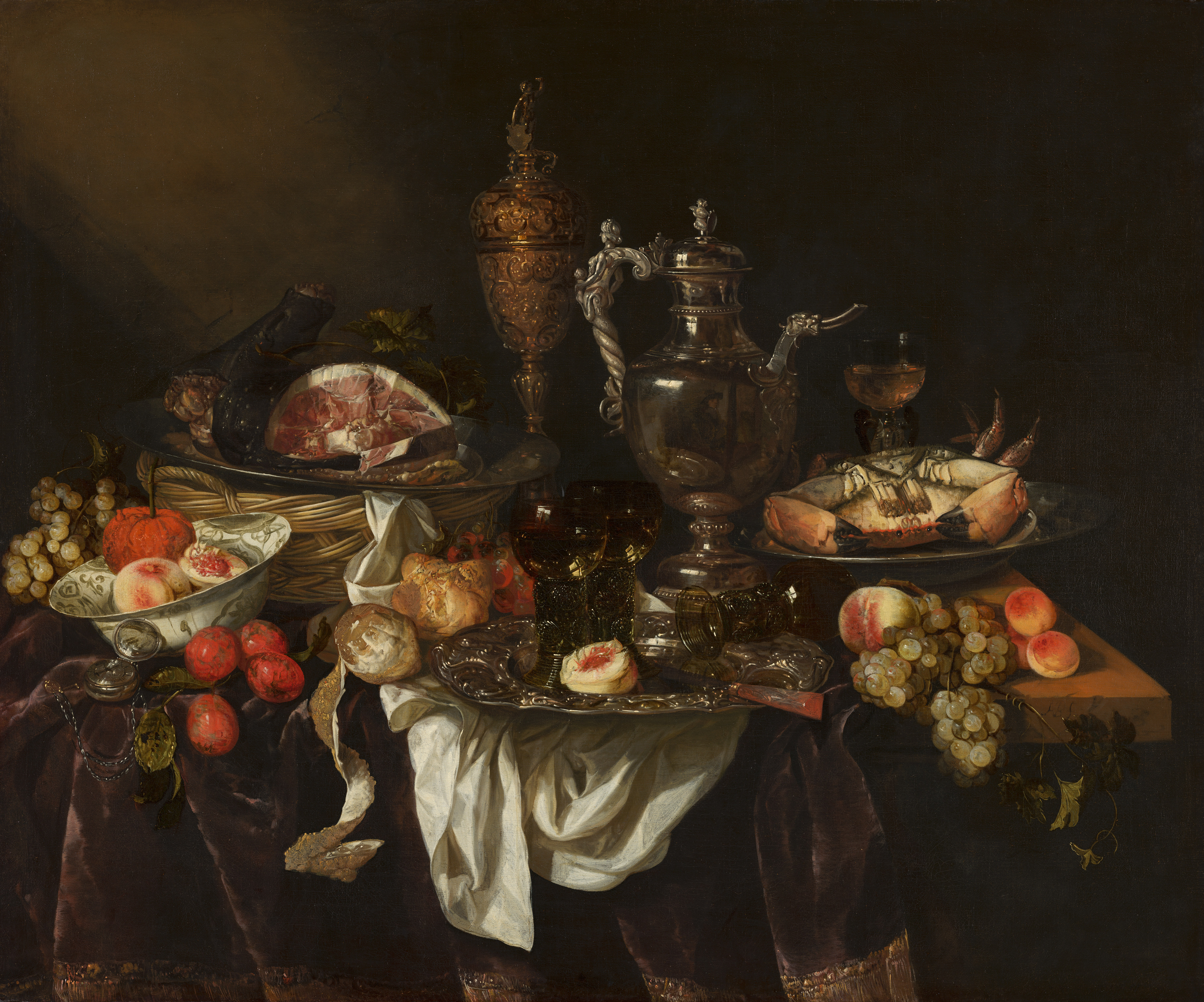
Ostentatious still life with self-portrait of the artist in the silver jug, Mauritshuis

Still Life with Haddocks and Plaice

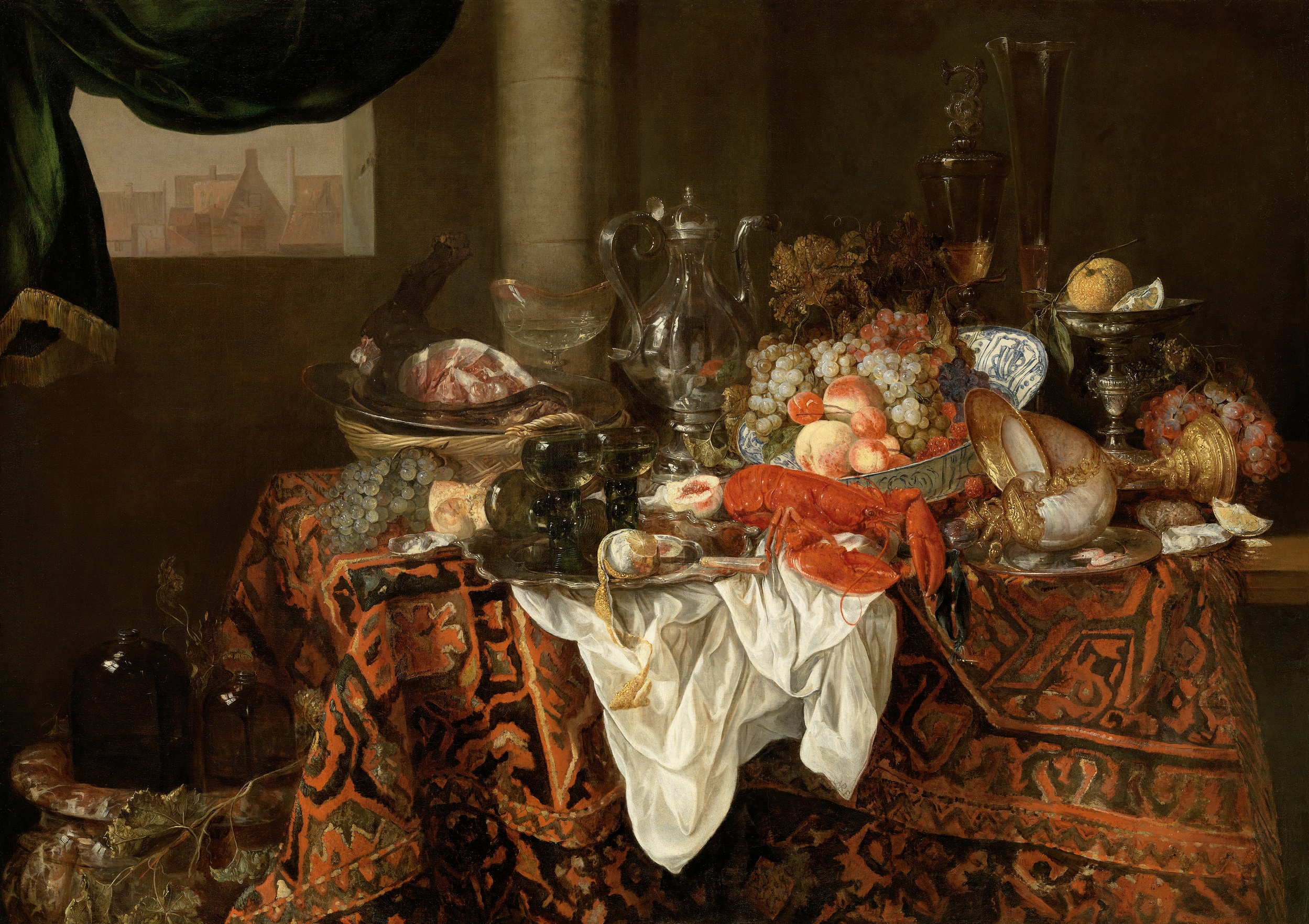
Still-Life with Landscape, 1650s
