= Daniël van den Queborn =

Dutch painter

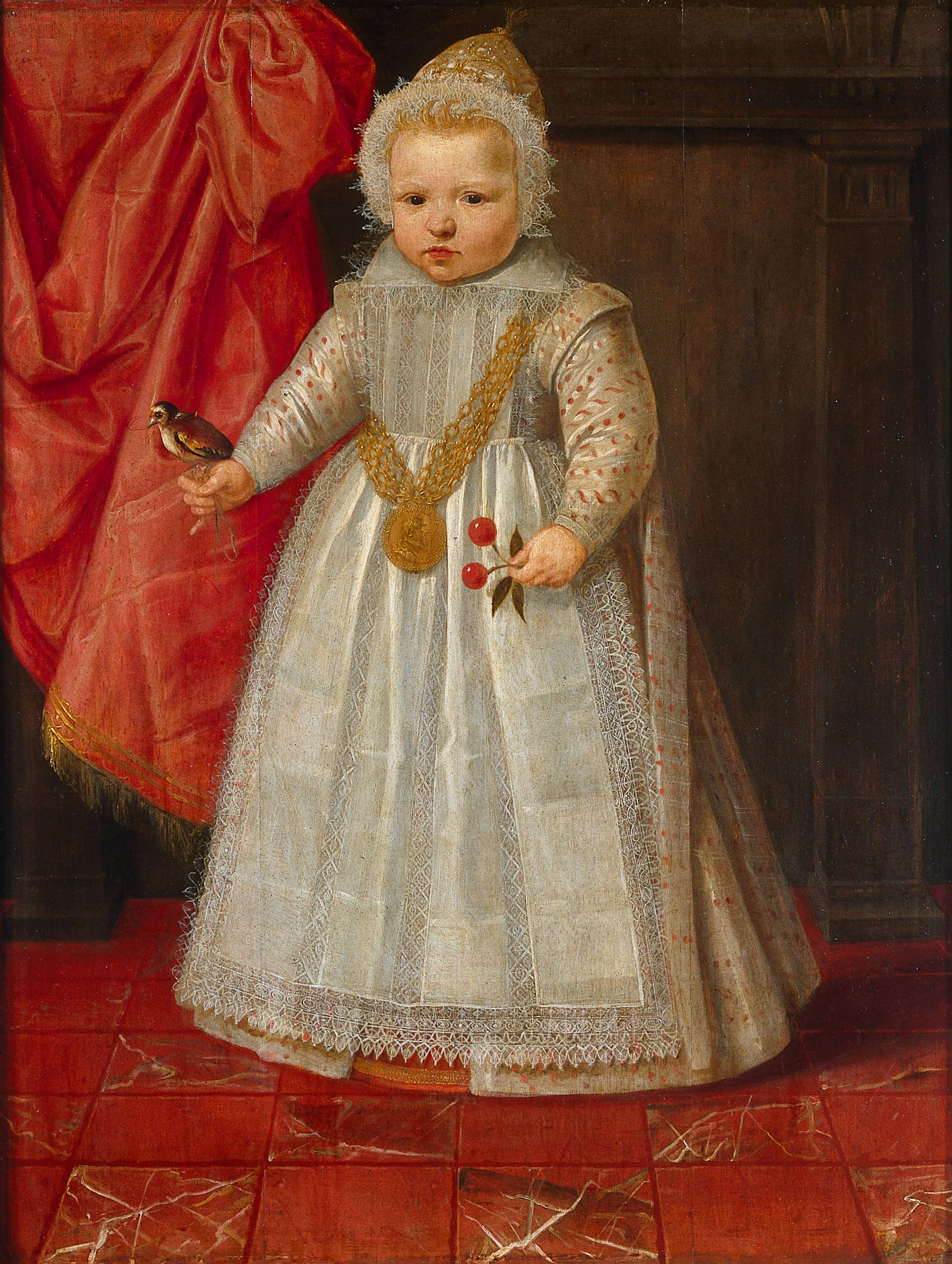
A male child 18 months old in 1604, possibly Lodewijk, the illegitimate son of Prince Maurits. The bird on the hand symbolizes a future as a falconer, a sport reserved for nobility.

Daniël van den Queborn (1552–1618) was a Dutch Golden Age painter.

== Biography ==
Van den Queborn was born in Antwerp. According to the RKD he became a member of the Antwerp Guild of St. Luke in 1577, but left the city and joined the guild in Middelburg in 1579. In 1594 he became court painter to Prince Maurits. He died in The Hague.

The father of the portrait painter and engraver Crispijn van den Queborn, Van den Queborn was the grandfather of the still life painter Anna van den Queborn.
