= Kruseman =

Kruseman is a surname. Notable people with the surname include:

- Cornelis Kruseman (1797–1857), Dutch painter
- Fredrik Marinus Kruseman (1816–1882), Dutch painter
- Jan Adam Kruseman (1804–1862), Dutch painter
- Jan Theodoor Kruseman (1835-1895), Dutch painter
- Mina Kruseman (1839–1922), Dutch feminist
- Cory Kruseman (born 1970), American race driver
