= Cornelis Kruseman Foundation =

Dutch foundation

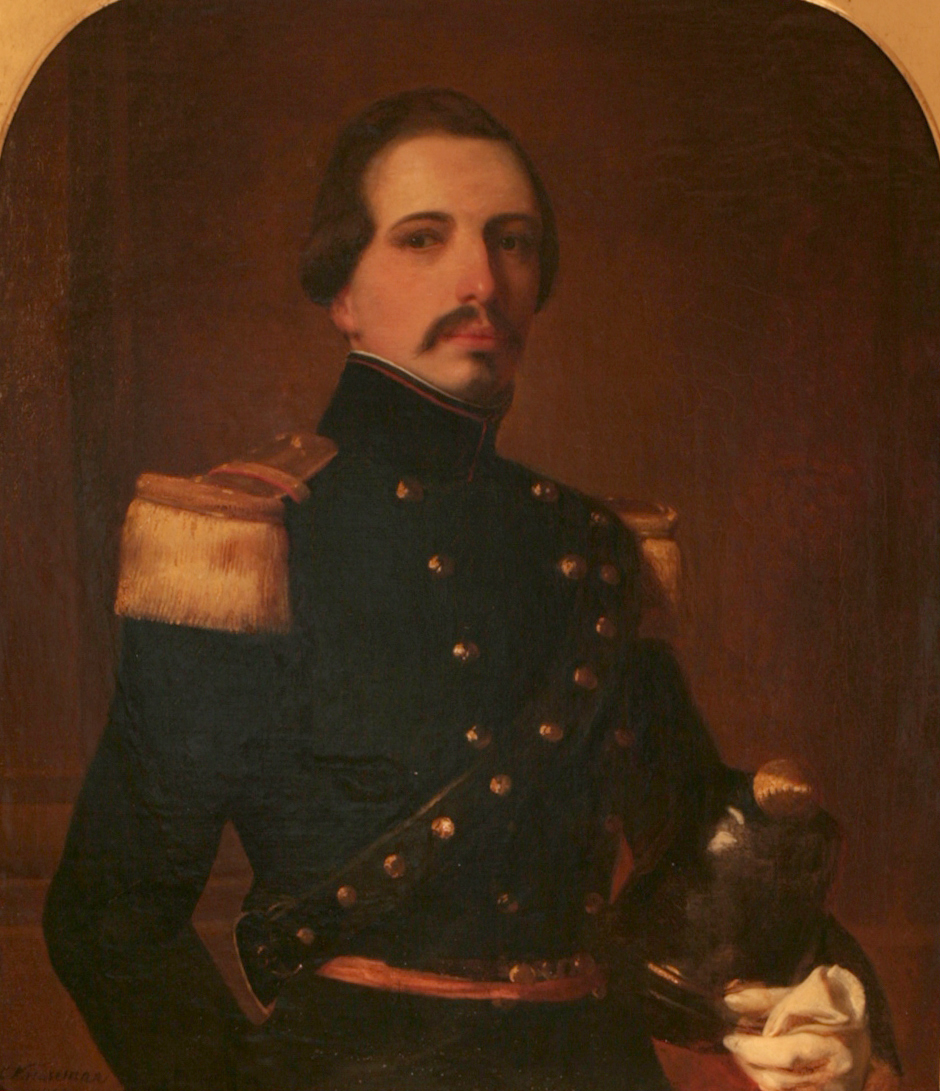
Cornelis Kruseman: portrait of Constant Gautier Cathérine François Ising (1823–1894).

The Cornelis Kruseman - J.M.C. Ising Foundation (Dutch: Cornelis Kruseman - J.M.C. Ising Stichting) is a Dutch foundation (stichting) that was established in 1996 and is located in The Hague, Netherlands. The foundation's objective is to bring the work of nineteenth century painter Cornelis Kruseman (1797–1857) and his painting family members to the attention of the public.

The foundation was established on the initiative of Jozina Maria Cornelia Ising. She was a descendant of Johannes Diederik Kruseman (1794–1861), whose eldest daughter Johanna Cornelia Maria Kruseman (1827–1914) in 1851 married Constant Gautier Cathérine François Ising (1823–1894), colonel of the artillery. Johannes Diederik Kruseman was the brother of Cornelis Kruseman and the father of painter Johannes Diederikus Kruseman (1828–1918). Ising bequeathed her fortune to the foundation and also arranged for the State of the Netherlands to grant the foundation the long-term loan of five paintings that she had donated to the State in 1971.

In addition to the five paintings referred to above the foundation also owns nine other works of Cornelis Kruseman, one painting by Jan Theodoor Kruseman and one water colour by Jan Adam Kruseman. The collection can be viewed on appointment.
