= David Bles =

Dutch painter (1821–1899)

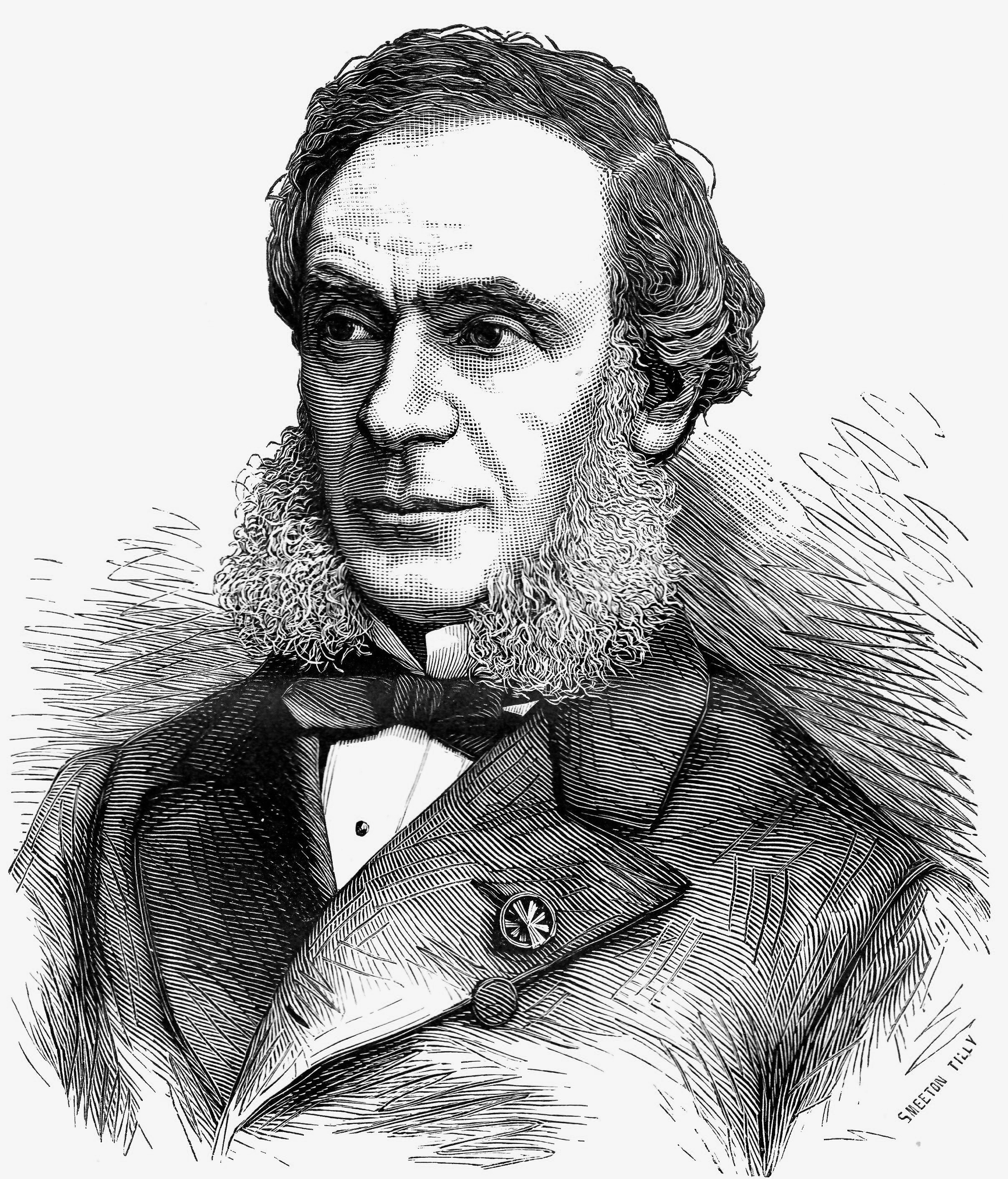
David Jozef Bles

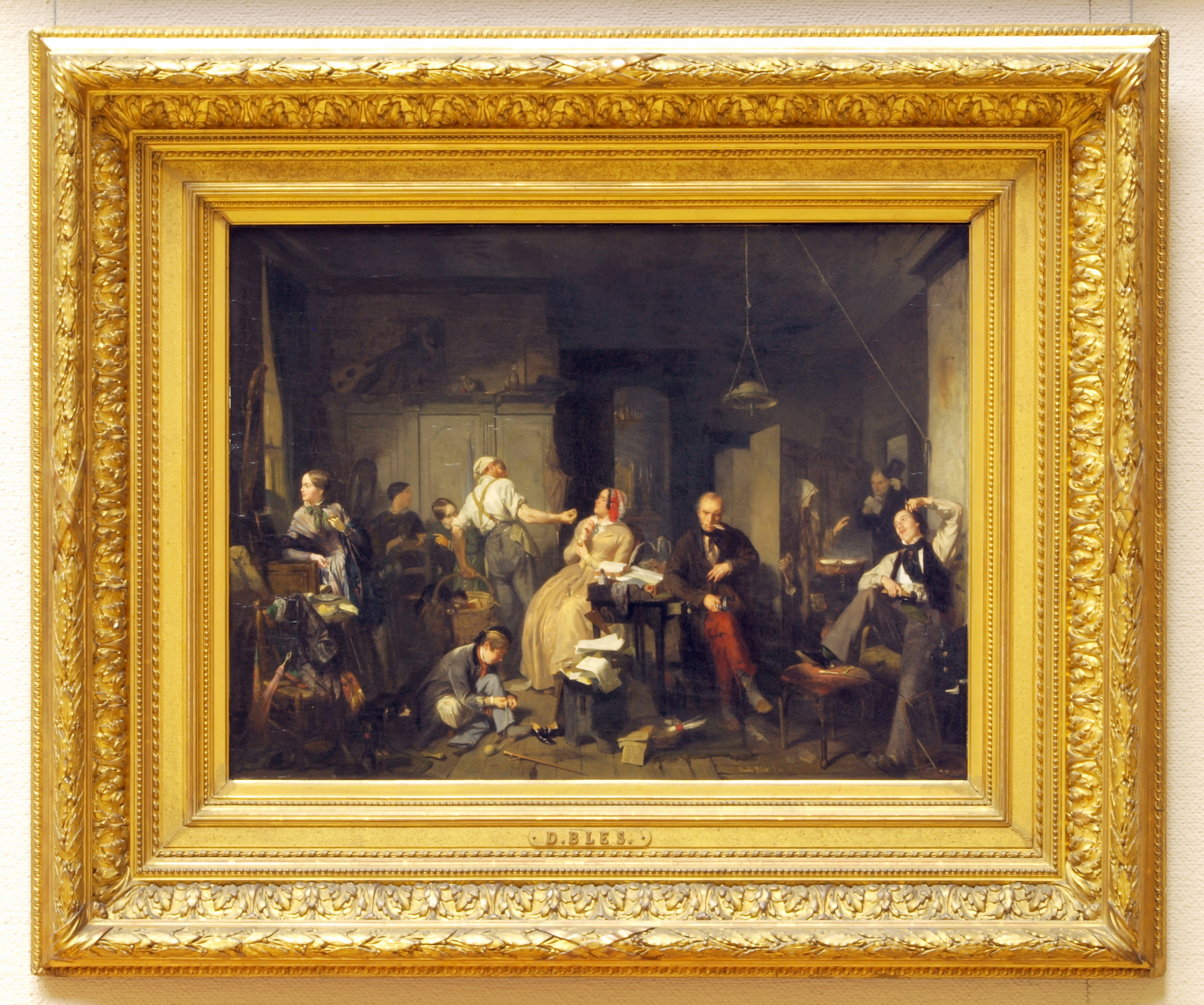
Poverty and wealth, 1848, collection Teylers Museum

David Bles (1821, The Hague – 1899, The Hague), was a 19th-century painter from the Northern Netherlands.

== Biography ==
David Bles was born to a merchant I. Bles.

According to the Netherlands Institute for Art History, at the age of thirteen Bles was talented enough to be accepted at the Hague Academy. He attended classes from 1834 to 1837 and from 1838 to 1841. He became a pupil of the painter Cornelis Kruseman and his nephew Jan Adam Kruseman. Bles then travelled to France to study with Joseph-Nicolas Robert-Fleury in Paris. He remained in Paris until 1843 after which he settled in The Hague, though he was a member of the Royal Academy in Amsterdam between 1845 and 1899. In 1850-60, his paintings were exhibited in various European countries. In 1859, he was elected an honorary associate of the Imperial Academy of Arts.

He painted scenes from the history of Dutch painting and is best known for portraits and genre paintings.

== Sources ==
- Belyaev, N. S. (2018). Honorary Free Associates of the Imperial Academy of Arts. Brief biographical guide (PDF). St Petersburg: Russian Academy of Sciences. p. 39. ISBN 978-5-336-00234-8.
