= Stichting =

Kind of legal entity under Dutch corporate law

A stichting (Dutch: [ˈstɪxtɪŋ], lit. 'foundation') is a Dutch legal entity with limited liability, not aiming to make profit, with no members or share capital, that exists for a specific purpose that is serving a public, social or an idealistic interest. A stichting is allowed to make profit but the legal condition is that this profit must be spent on achieving the foundation's goals. This form of entity makes it possible to separate functions of ownership and control.

== Formation ==
A stichting is a legal person created through a legal act. This act is usually a notarised deed, but can also be established by a Dutch will ('uiterste wilsbeschikking'), and must contain the articles of the foundation which must include the first appointed board. The civil-law notary works here in a public role, and is seen as the public authority involved in the creation and authorization of a foundation. The stichting acquires full legal capacity through its sole creation. A foundation has no members and its purpose must be stated in its articles, using capital dedicated to such goal. The rules for foundations are defined in the Dutch Civil Code (Burgerlijk Wetboek), Boek 2, Titel 6 (artt. 2:285-304).

A foundation can be governed and represented by one board that has both executive and controlling tasks and is also responsible for the foundation's administration. The law does not have a requirement for a specific number of members but speaks of 'members' in plural. It is possible to create two boards (two-tier board structure), one has the function of overviewing the executive day-by-day governing, the Governing Board ("Raad van Bestuur"), the other one has an overall control function, the Supervisory Board or Board of Trustees ("Raad van Toezicht" of "Raad van Commisarissen).

Art. 2:289 of the Civil Code establishes that all foundations must be registered at the official public Commercial Register ("handelsregister" at the "Kamer van Koophandel"). As long as the foundation hasn't been registered, the boardmembers bear personal responsibility. In another register, UBO, the ultimate beneficial owner(s) have to be undisclosed.

Commercial activities are allowed if they are within the purpose of the foundation and are taxed. Board members can be held liable for the foundation, civilly as well as criminally, when they do not comply with general rules of good governance, like for instance written down in the "Nederlandse Corporate Governance Code".

It is not necessary in the Netherlands that a foundation serves a purpose of general interest, it can also be a social or an idealistic goal and its official goal cannot include making payments to anybody, except for charitable causes. The Dutch Tax Service can declare a legal entity to be an "institution for general benefit" (ANBI), which grants tax exemptions. Many foundations apply for this status, as do some other entities, which requires evidence of good governance and publishing of financial statements. Not every foundation qualifies, or for smaller time limited foundations are willing or capable to invest in meeting the requirements.

Given the lack of shares, the stichting structure owning a company has been pioneered successfully in recent years as a 'poison pill' style defence tactic against hostile takeovers by Scott V Simpson, one of Europe's leading mergers and acquisitions lawyers. The most common strategy is to create a stichting, and gift it considerable call options. If a hostile takeover is announced the stichting can call in these options making it much harder for the hostile bidder to gain a majority share. This was not the use Dutch lawmakers had in mind when drawing the law.

== Examples ==
=== (examples of) General benefit organizations ===
- Cornelis Kruseman Stichting – purpose: bring the work of painter Cornelis Kruseman (1797–1857) to the attention of the public.
- Stichting Museumjaarkaart – purpose: promote visits to Dutch museums.
- Nederlandse Omroep Stichting – purpose: make news and sports programmes for the three Dutch public television channels and the Dutch public radio services.
- Stichting FERN – purpose: promote greater environmental and social justice, focusing on forests and forest peoples’ rights.
- Stichting INGKA Foundation – purpose: promote and support innovation in the field of architectural and interior design.
- Stichting Max Havelaar – purpose: the Dutch member of Fairtrade International.
- Stichting Pensioenfonds ABP – pension fund for the government and educational sectors.
- Stichting Pensioenfonds Zorg en Welzijn – pension fund for the healthcare and social work sectors.
- Wiardi Beckman Stichting – purpose: a think tank linked to the Labour Party (PvdA).
- Mars One – purpose: establish a permanent human colony on Mars.
- MINIX 3 – Stichting MINIX Research Foundation - purpose: Support and develop Minix3 Operating System.
- Urgenda – Foundation who won the State of the Netherlands v. Urgenda Foundation case at the Netherlands Supreme Court

=== Takeover defense ===
Stichtingen (Dutch plural form) are used as a type of poison pill (takeover defense mechanism) for publicly traded companies. In one case, the Dutch-incorporated pharmaceutical company Mylan established a stichting for the purpose of "safeguarding Mylan’s strategy, mission and independence" and gave the stichting the right to veto any proposed hostile takeover of Mylan. The stichting was activated in July 2015 to block a planned takeover by Teva Pharmaceutical Industries.

=== Finance and investment ===
Stichtingen are used by institutional investors, such as banks and wealthy individuals, as a means of controlling assets while not having legal ownership or consolidating the assets on their financial statements. The properties of a stichting can be used to avoid inheritance tax, trade sanctions and expropriation. In one case, the Libyan-based oil company Oilinvest used a stichting structure to avoid sanctions on Libya and ensure its continued operation following the overthrow of Muammar Gaddafi; in another case, the Russian oil company Yukos used a stichting structure in an attempt to shield its assets from tax claims by the Russian government.

== Netherlands Antilles ==
Foundation legislation was last reformed in 1998, giving rise to the Netherlands Antilles Private Foundation (Stichting Particulier Fonds).

== See also ==
- Vereniging
- Naamloze vennootschap
- Besloten vennootschap
- Private foundation
- Stiftung
- Eingetragener Verein (e. V.), a registered voluntary association under German law
- Swiss Verein, a voluntary association under Swiss law, not necessarily registered
