= Petrus Augustus de Génestet =

Dutch writer

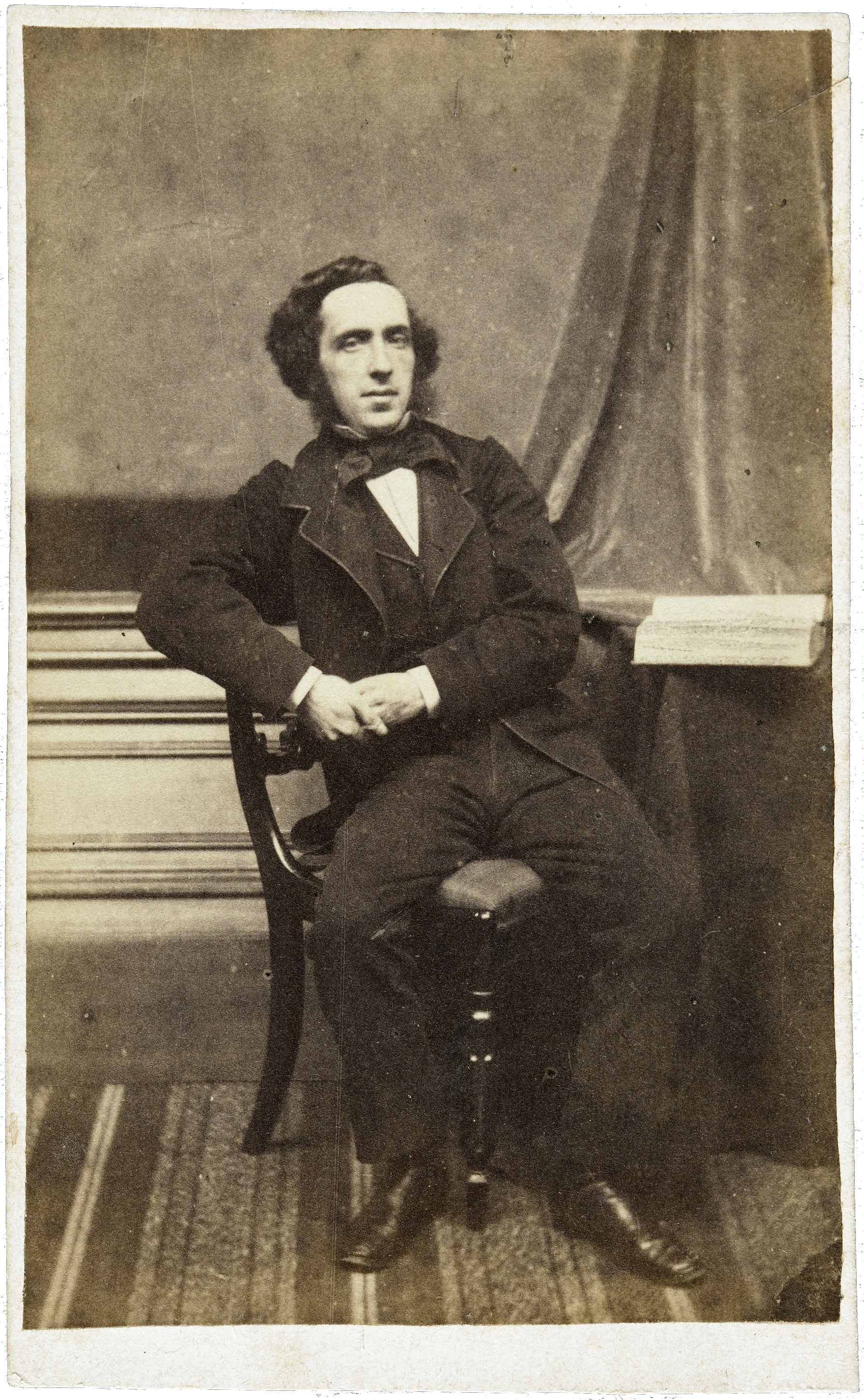
Petrus Augustus de Génestet (c.1860)

Petrus Augustus de Génestet (commonly referred to as "P.A. de Génestet") (Amsterdam, 21 November 1829 – Rozendaal, 2 July 1861) was a Dutch poet and theologian.

De Génestet lost both of his parents at a very young age; after that he lived with his uncle, the Dutch painter Jan Adam Kruseman. He studied at the Amsterdamse Atheneum and the Seminarium der Remonstrantse Broederschap to become a preacher. He became a preacher in March 1852 and worked in Moordrecht. In December of the same year he started working in Delft, the same city that still has the Genestetkerk, a Remonstrant church that was named after him.

Shortly after moving to Delft he married Henriette Bienfait in Bloemendaal. They had four children. In 1859, both his wife and oldest child died of tuberculosis, and because of his poor health he had to quit working as a preacher. He moved to Amsterdam, but spent most of his summers in Bloemendaal.

Two years later, in 1861, he died in Rozendaal due to tuberculosis. After his death, poet Bernard ter Haar wrote Op het Kerkhof te Roozendaal ("At the cemetery of Roozendaal") for him. In 1862 the memorial for De Génestet at the Rozendaal cemetery was revealed.

His narrative poem De Sint-Nicolaasavond ("Saint Nicholas's Eve") appeared in 1849.
