= The Great Belzoni =

Painting by Jan Adam Kruseman

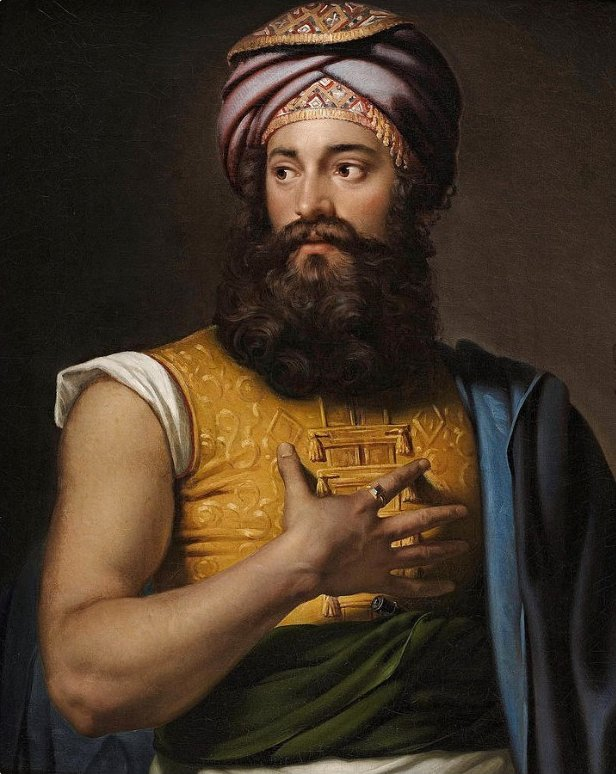
- Artist: Jan Adam Kruseman
- Year: 1824
- Type: Oil on canvas, portrait painting
- Dimensions: 85 cm × 70 cm (33 in × 28 in)
- Location: Fitzwilliam Museum; Cambridge

The Great Belzoni is an 1824 portrait painting by the Dutch artist Jan Adam Kruseman. It depicts Giovanni Belzoni, the Italian archaeologist and explorer of Ancient Egyptian locations. Belzoni was noted for his height and strength.

In December 1823 Belzoni died from dysentery while on an expedition to West Africa, so the finished work was posthumous. Today the painting is in the collection of the Fitzwilliam Museum in Cambridge, having been acquired in 2018.

== Bibliography ==
- Hume, Ivor Noël. Belzoni: The Giant Archaeologists Love to Hate. University of Virginia Press, 2011.
- Mayes, Stanley, The Great Belzoni: The Circus Strongman Who Discovered Egypt's Ancient Treasure. Bloomsbury Publishing, 2003.
