= Everhardus Koster =

Dutch painter (1817–1892)

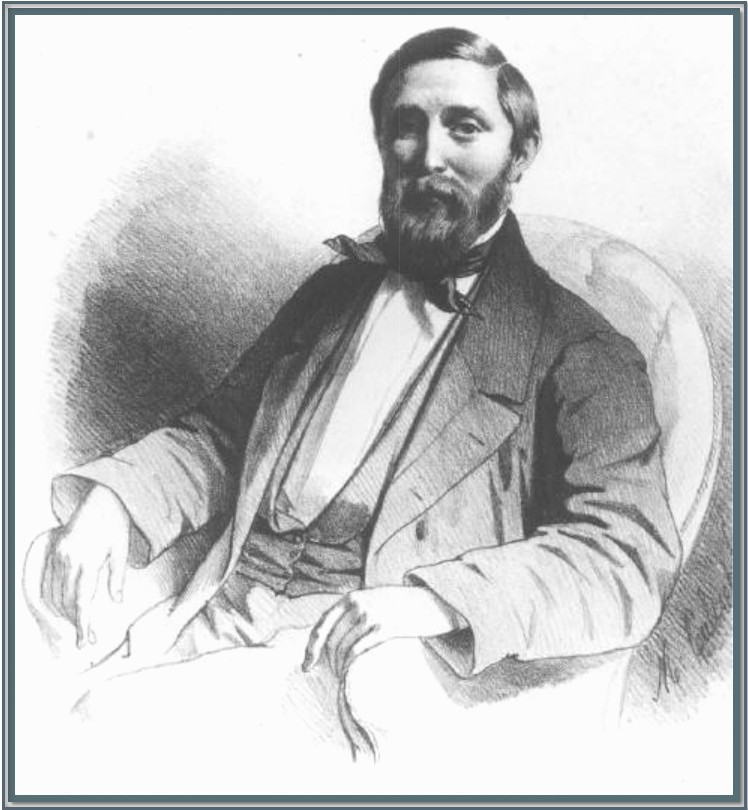
Everhardus Koster; lithograph by Moritz Calisch (1858)

Everhardus Koster (17 February 1817, The Hague – 8 January 1892, Dordrecht) was a Dutch painter who specialized in sea and river scenes. For many years, he served as Director of the various museums that were formerly housed in the Villa Welgelegen.

== Biography ==
Like many artists, he displayed a talent for drawing at an early age, and was especially attracted to the many merchant ships that he could observe from his home. Practical considerations prevailed, however, and he decided to become a marine engineer. At sixteen, he had barely begun his studies when his artistic abilities were noticed by Bartholomeus Johannes van Hove, who encouraged him to enroll at the Royal Academy of Art, where Van Hove was serving as director.

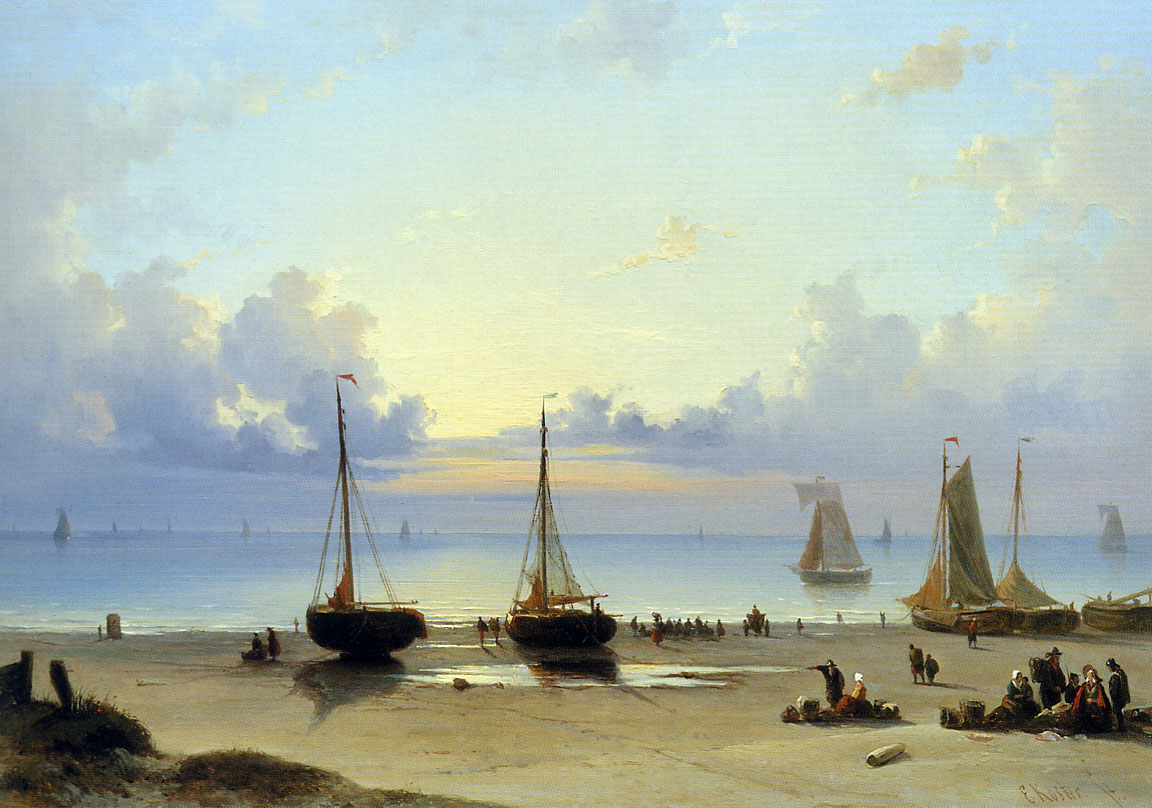
Seascape

After his studies there, he went to Frankfurt, where he improved his skills by copying the Old Masters at the Städel and studying at the Städelschule. He then took up residence in Amsterdam, where he established a studio. He quickly became very popular and, in 1852, was elected a member of the Rijksakademie. In 1858, he became a curator at the Villa Welgelegen.

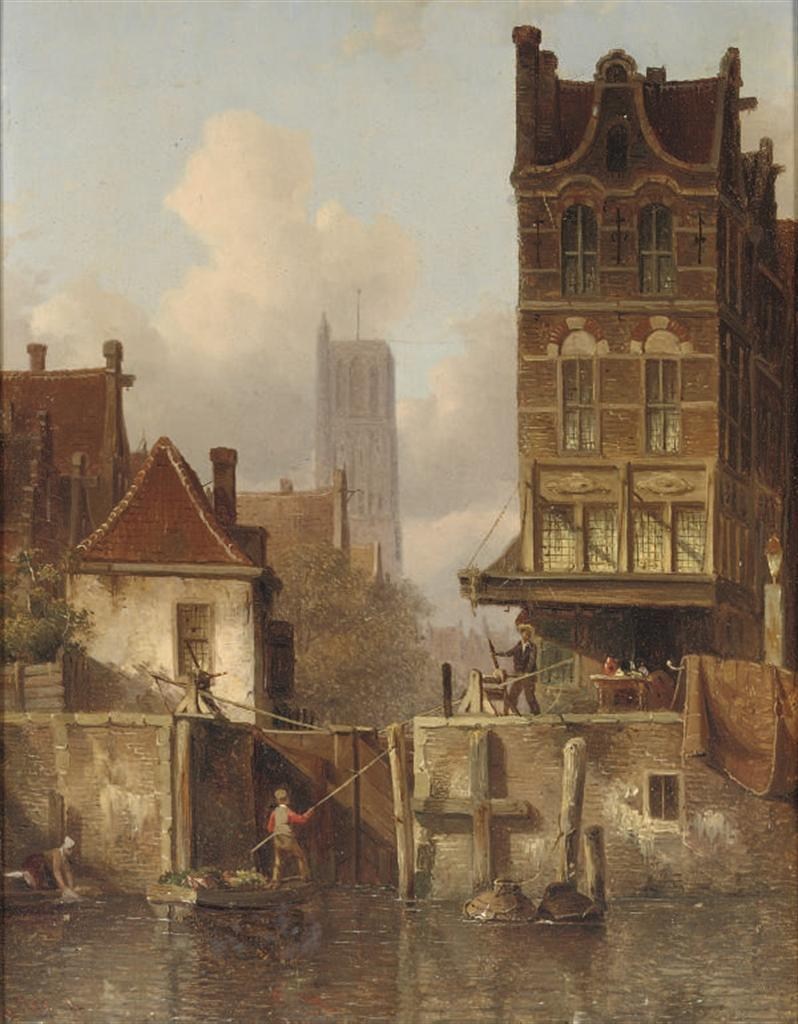
At the Town Lock

In 1859, he lost his right eye in an accident. After he was reasonably accustomed to it, he was able to continue painting, but remained bitter and complained frequently. He also found himself caught up in complaints from the artistic community involving the way art works were purchased by the Villa and its methods of storage, which were considered inadequate for preservation. Eventually these issues were addressed and parts of the collection were moved to the newly renovated Rijksmuseum.

He remained at the Villa until 1878, when he moved back to The Hague. Later, he settled in Dordrecht, where he continued to paint until his death in 1892.
