= Jan Theodoor Kruseman =

Dutch painter

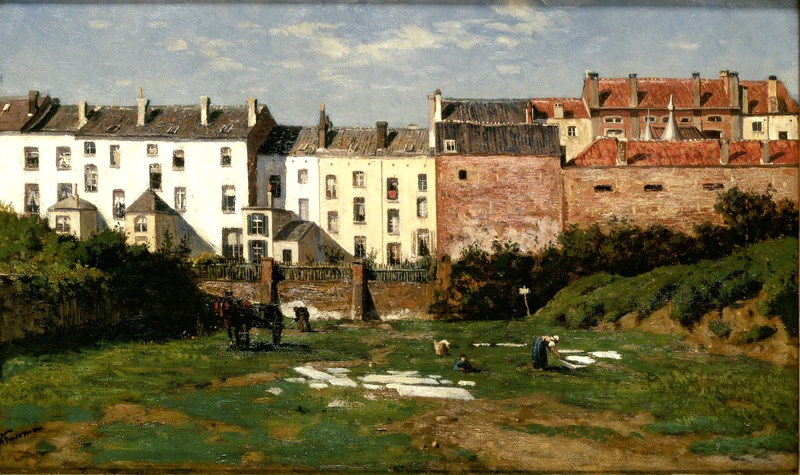
Neighborhood in Brussels

Jan Theodoor Kruseman (7 November 1835, Amsterdam - 19 February 1895, Uccle) was a Dutch painter who specialized in landscapes and maritime scenes.

== Biography ==
His father was the portrait painter Jan Adam Kruseman. After initially pursuing a career in overseas shipping, he became interested in painting and drawing and, in 1851, took lessons from Everhardus Koster.

in 1853, he went to Brussels, where he stayed for two years; receiving further advice and encouragement from Willem Roelofs. Later, he and Roelofs travelled to Luxembourg and Germany. When they returned, he spent some time working with his father. He also visited the island of Terschelling to paint seascapes.

He polished his skills by studying with Nicolaas Riegen (1827-1889) and Louis Meijer. Accompanied by Meijer and Mauritz de Haas, he embarked on a painting trip to Normandy, Brittany and the island of Jersey. After a trip to England in 1860, he returned to Brussels and remained there.

== Sources ==
- M. van Heteren, J. de Meere, Fredrik Marinus Kruseman (1816-1882) Painter of pleasing landscapes, Schiedam: Scriptum, 1998 ISBN 978-90-559-4082-0
