= Moritz Calisch =

Dutch painter

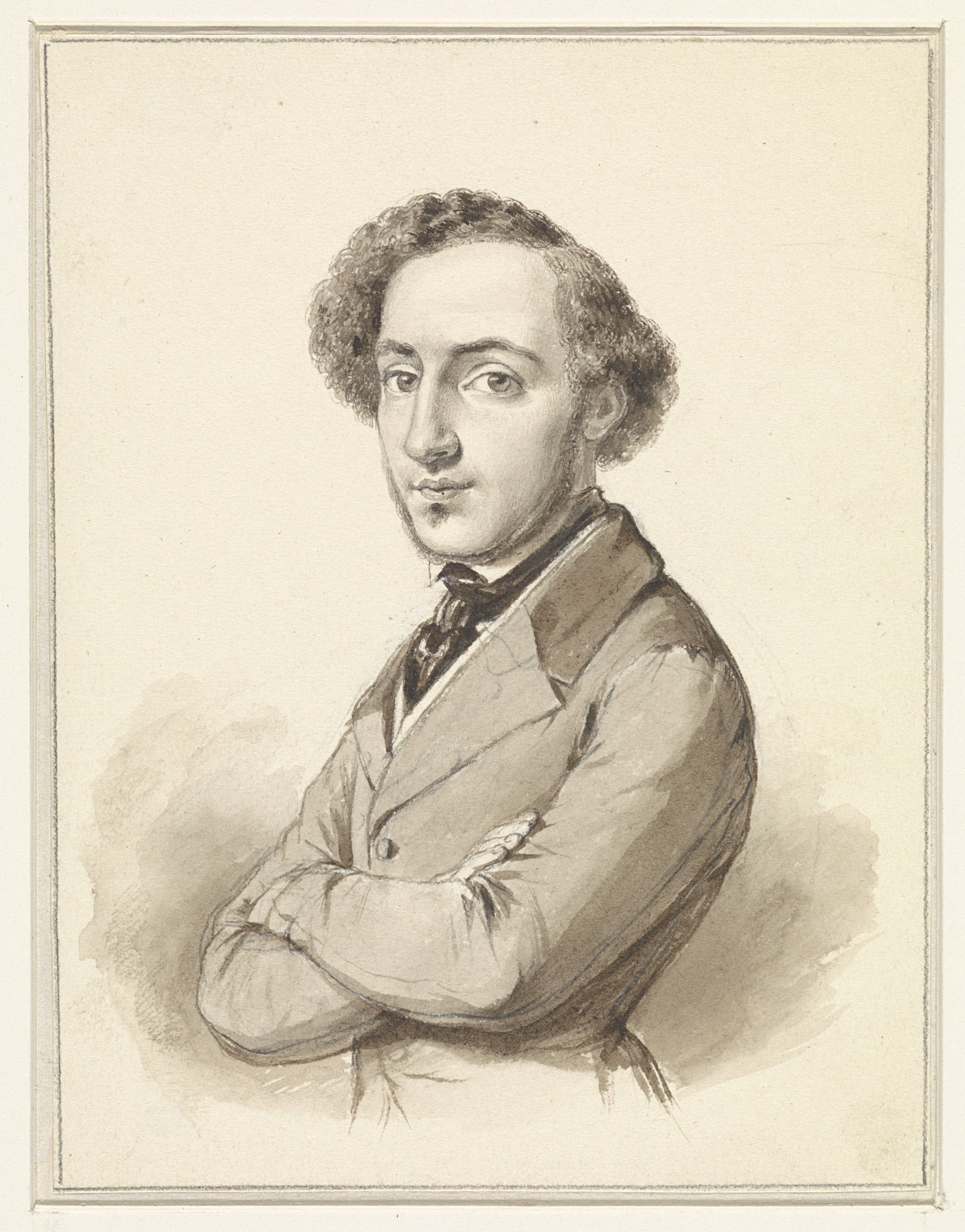
Self portrait

Moritz Calisch (12 April 1819, Amsterdam – 13 March 1870, Amsterdam), was a 19th-century painter from the Netherlands.

== Biography ==
According to the RKD he studied at the Royal Academy of Amsterdam under Jan Adam Kruseman and became a member of Arti et Amicitiae, where he later served as vice-chairman. In 1834 he won 150 guilders from the Drawing society of Rotterdam and a double silver medal for two paintings; A nursery visit in the family of a fisherman and Louis Bonaparte offering assistance during a flood. He is known for portraits of the Jewish elite of Amsterdam, but also for historical genre works in the romantic style of the 19th century. He was himself Jewish and three of his friends took the initiative to create a monument in his name.

== Gallery ==
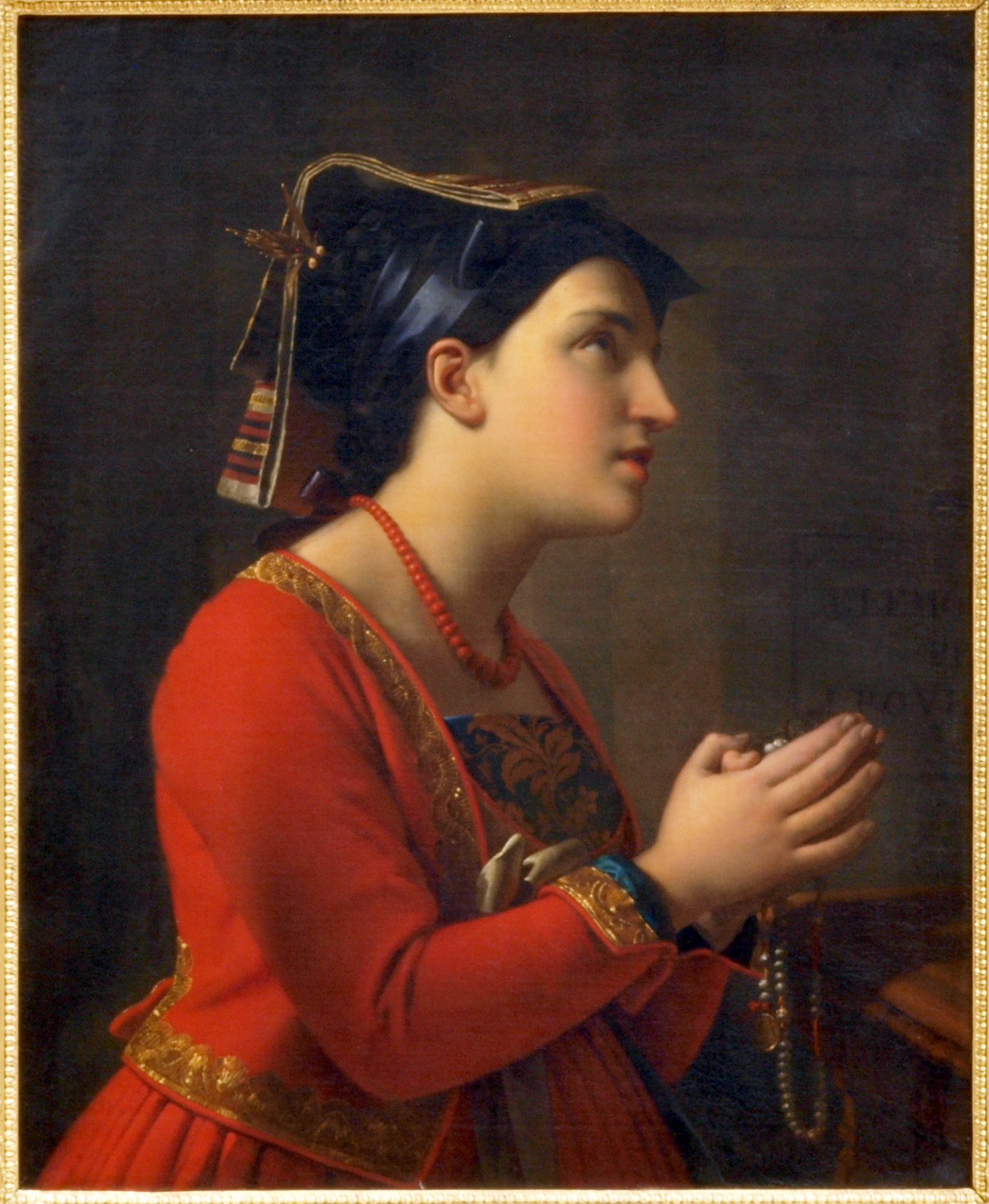
Young woman in prayer, 1850, collection Teylers Museum

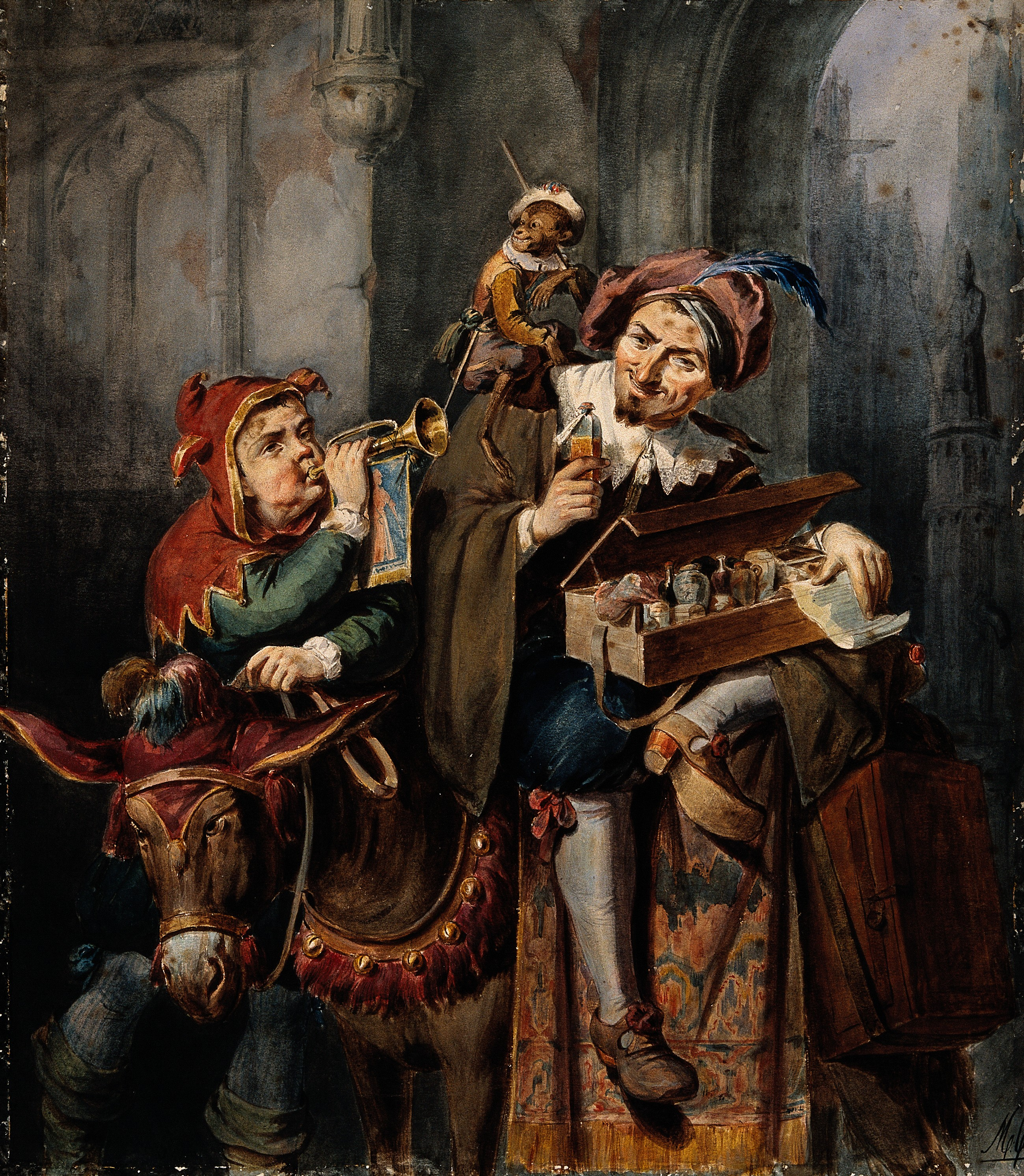
Itinerant Medicine Vendor

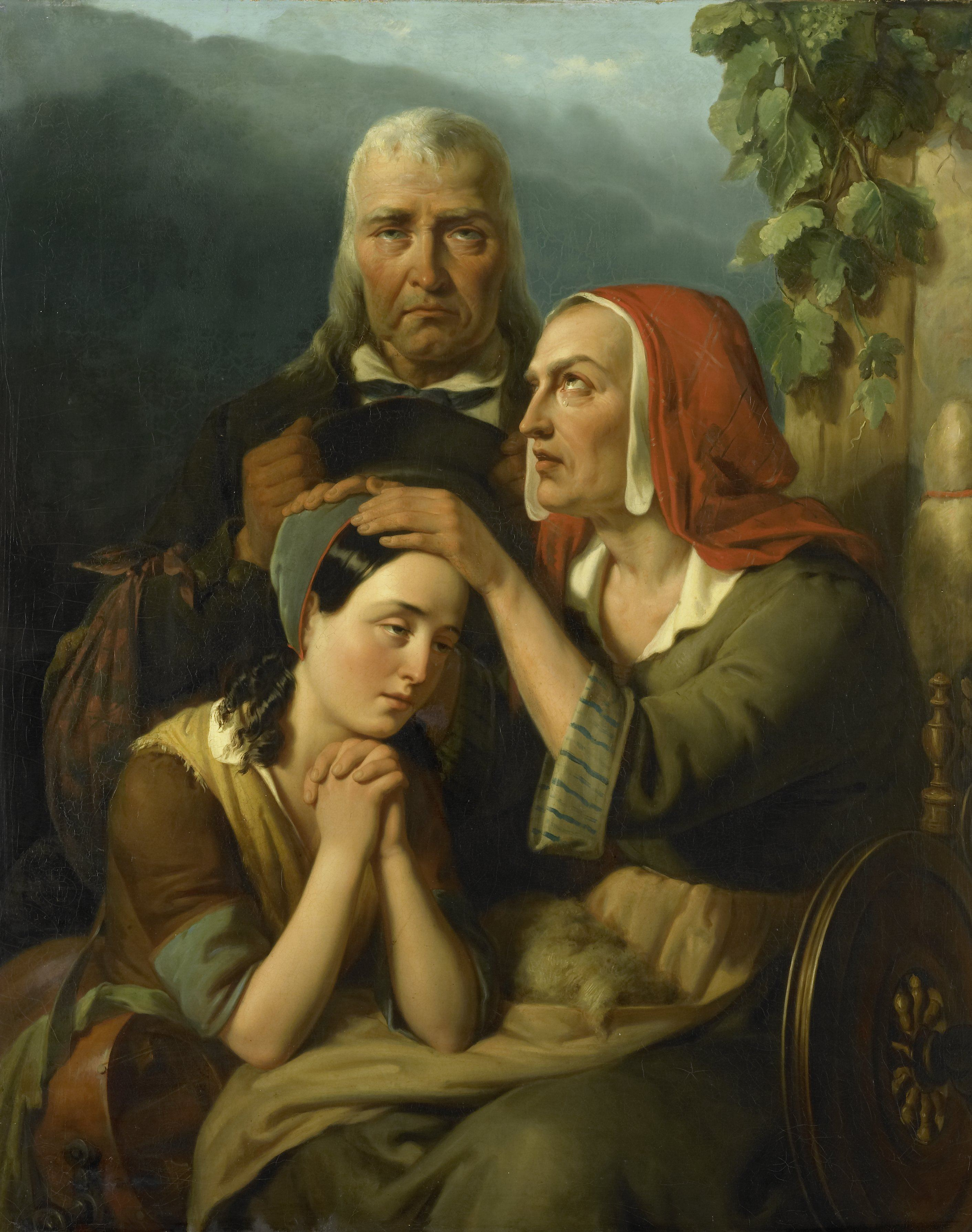
A Mother's Blessing, 1844
