= Jan Adam Kruseman =

Dutch painter

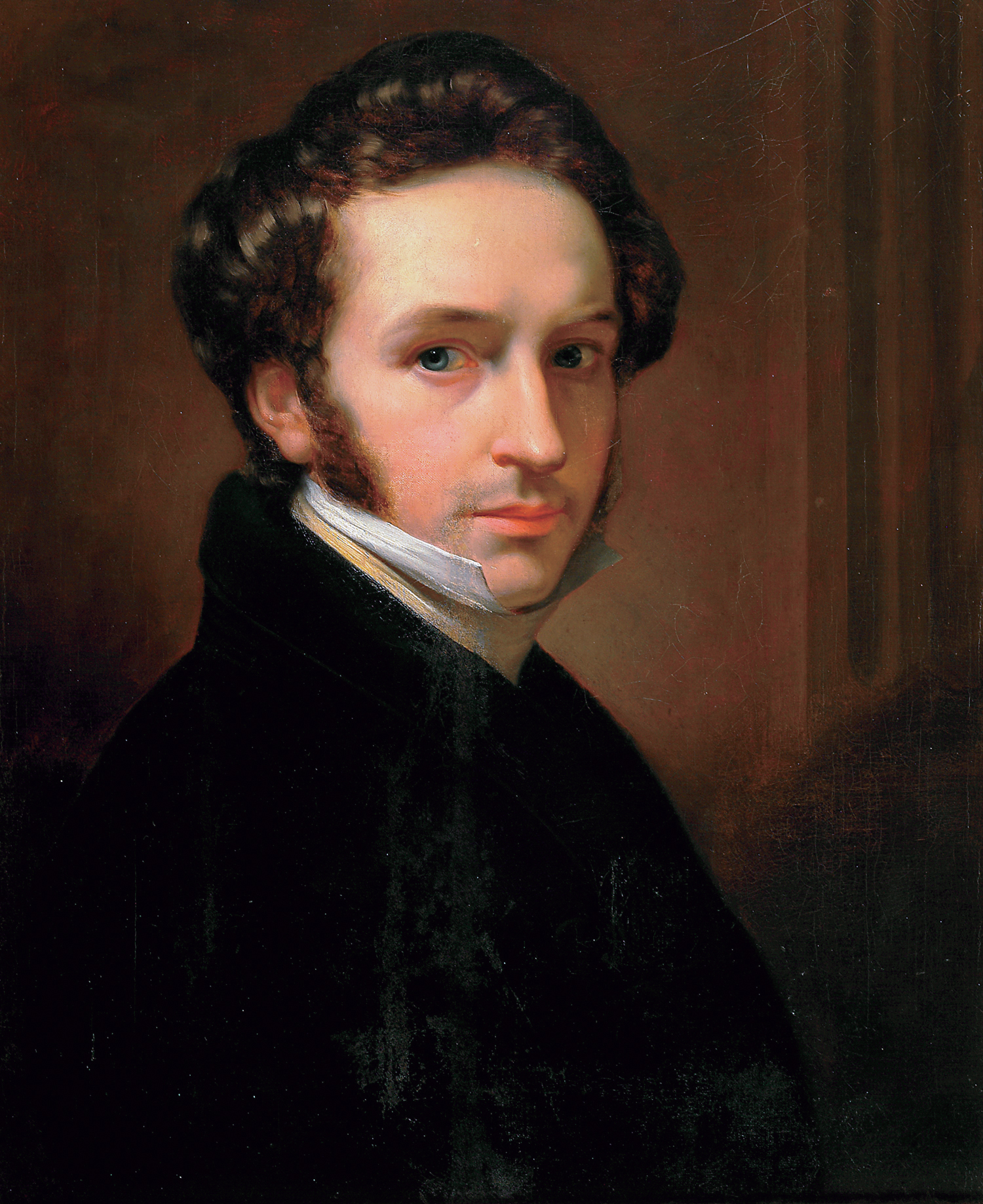
Self-portrait (1827)

Jan Adam Kruseman (12 February 1804 – 17 March 1862) was a Dutch painter, known primarily for his portraits, although he also did landscapes and genre scenes.

== Biography ==
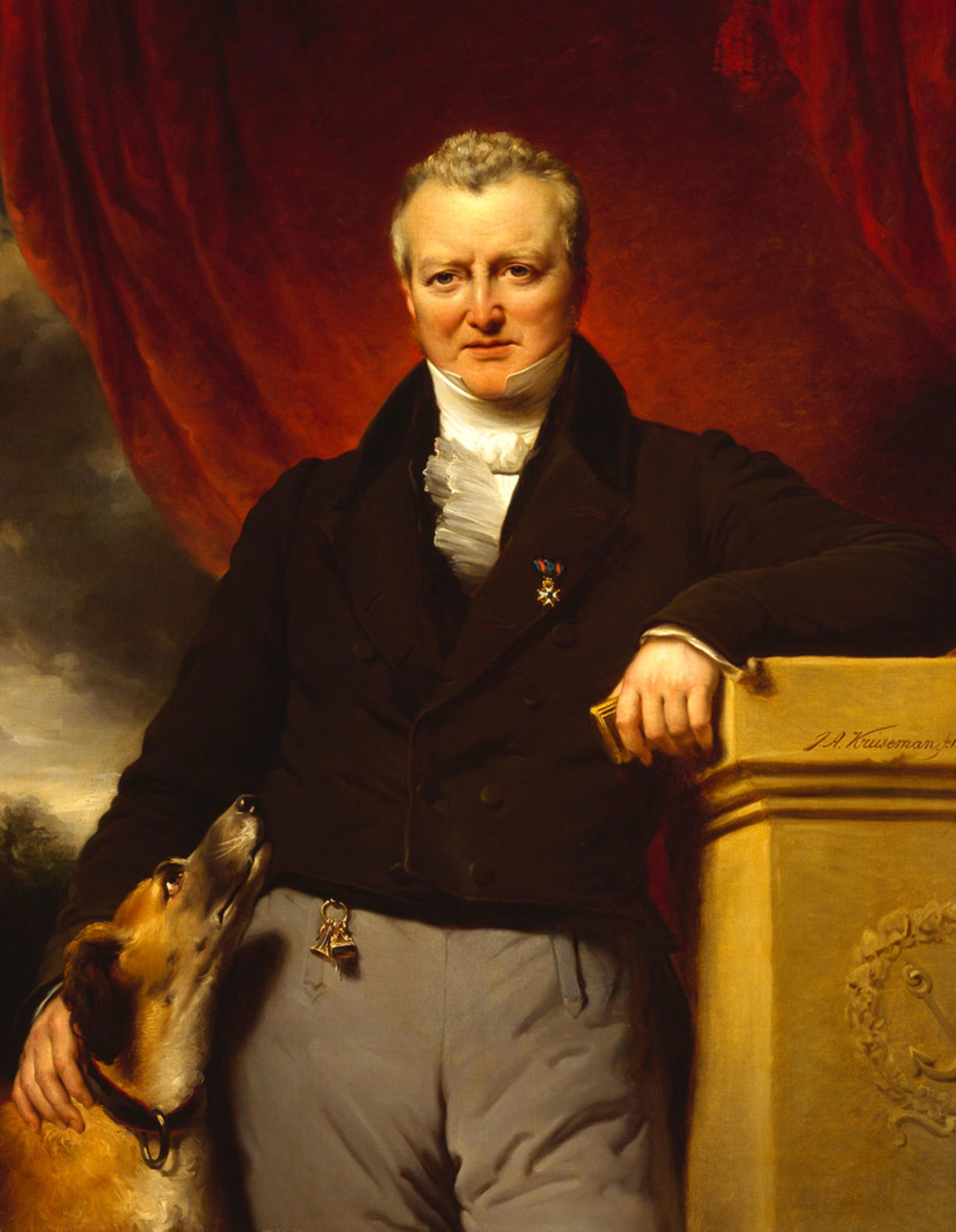
Portrait of Adriaan van der Hoop

Kruseman was born in Haarlem to a prominent family that would produce several well-known artists. In 1819, at the age of fifteen, he went to Amsterdam and enrolled at the Tekenacademie, where he received his first lessons from his cousin, Cornelis Kruseman. From 1822 to 1824 he studied in Brussels with François-Joseph Navez and Jacques-Louis David.

At the age of twenty-six, in 1830, he became Director of the Academy of Fine Arts (precursor to the Rijksakademie). Three years later, after doing a portrait of Adriaan van der Hoop, a banker with connections to the royal family, he received a commission to paint a posthumous portrait of Tsar Alexander I, intended as a gift for Anna Pavlovna, who was married to Crown Prince William. After William ascended to the throne, Kruseman was commissioned to paint official portraits of the royal family, including six of the King.

In 1839, along with the engraver André-Benoit Taurel (1794–1859) and Marinus Tétar van Elven (1803–1883), an architect, he became one of the founders of Arti et Amicitiae. In 1844, he was named a Ridder in the Order of the Netherlands Lion. He was married in 1826 and had seven children, including Jan Theodoor Kruseman, who became a noted landscape painter. In 1836, his nephew, the future theologian and poet Petrus Augustus de Génestet, came to live with his family after being orphaned.

He created over 500 portraits, mostly of the nobility and wealthy burghers. His portraits are notable for their lack of idealization and attention to the details of clothing. He had numerous successful students; among the best-known were David Bles, Moritz Calisch and Jozef Israëls.

Kruseman died in Haarlem in 1862. After his death, he was largely forgotten although, in the 1960s, a street in Rosmalen was named after him. From 2002 to 2003, a major retrospective was held at the Het Loo Palace and, in 2015, an exhibition featuring all the artists of the extended Kruseman family was held at the Stedelijk Museum Alkmaar.

== Selected works ==
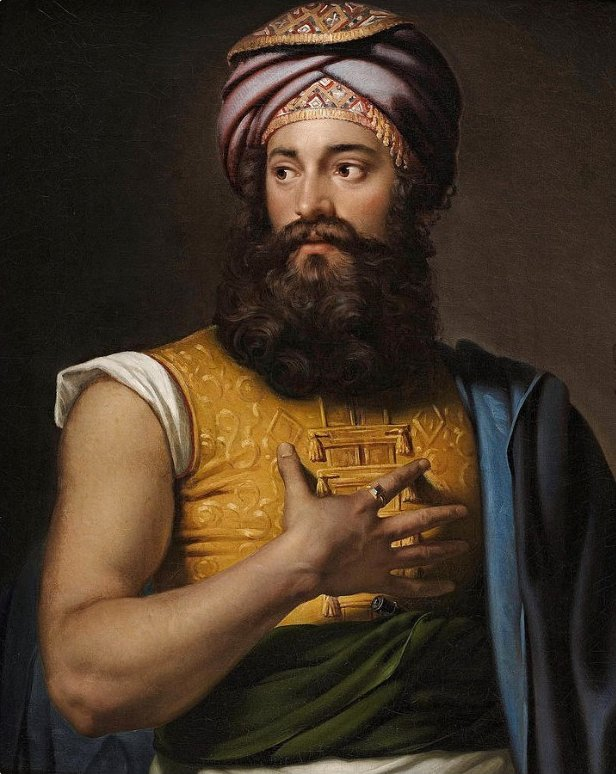
The Great Belzoni, 1824

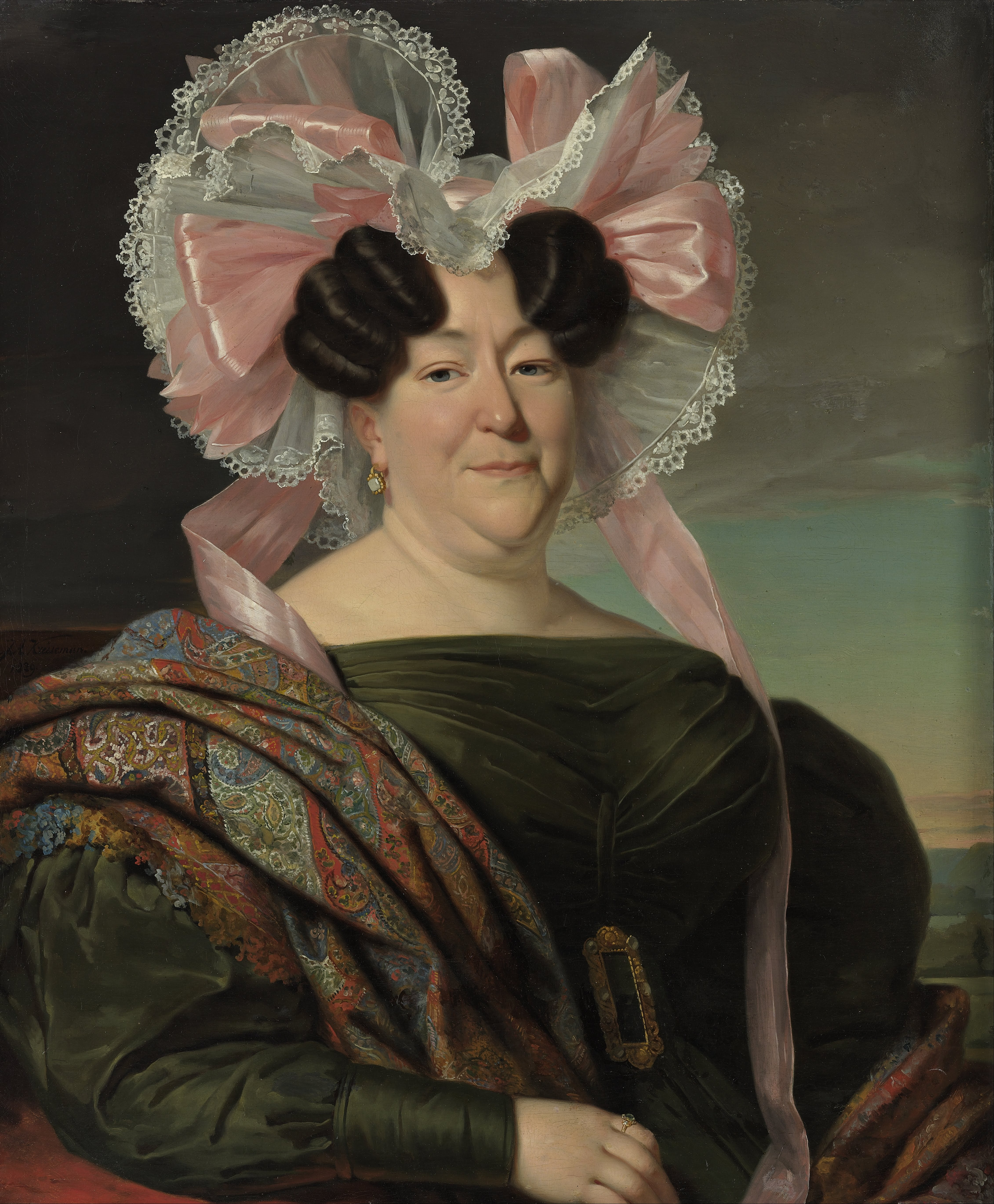
Portrait of a Lady

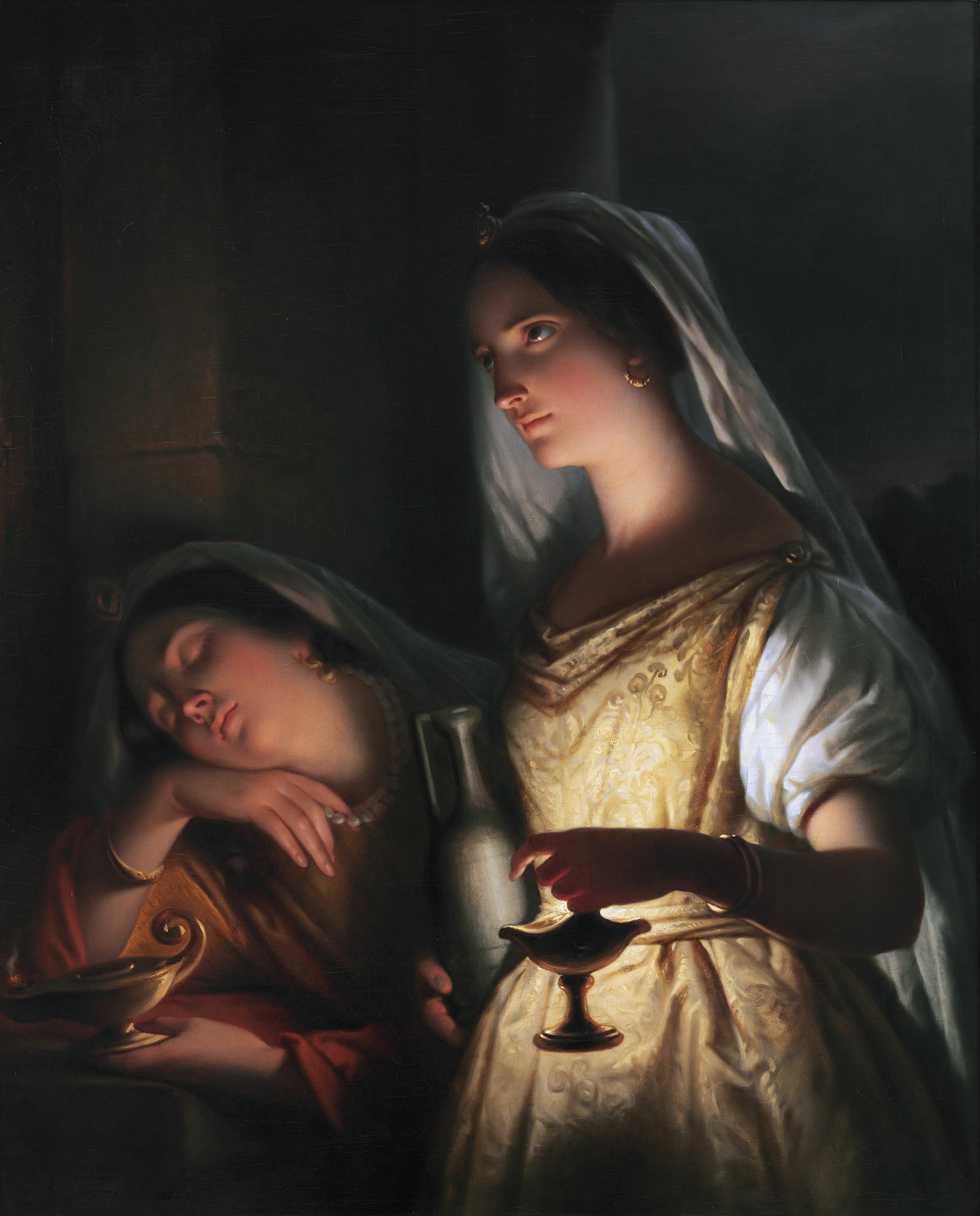
The wise and the foolish virgin

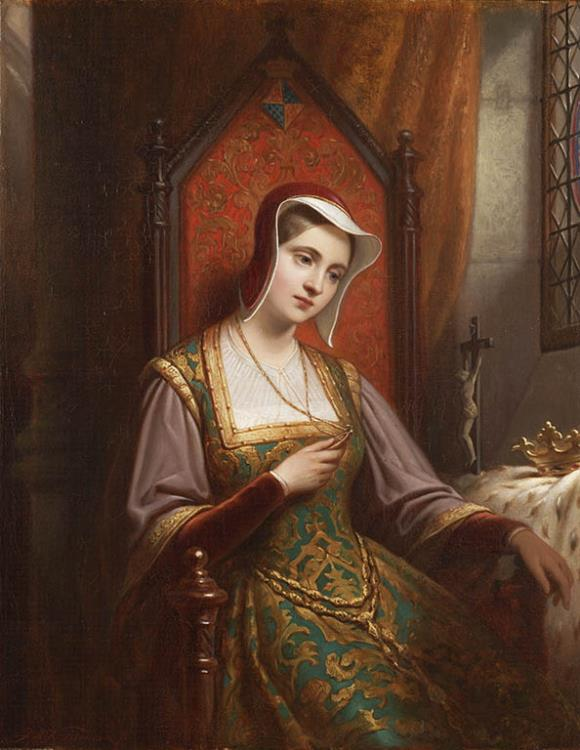
Ada, Countess of Holland in Exile

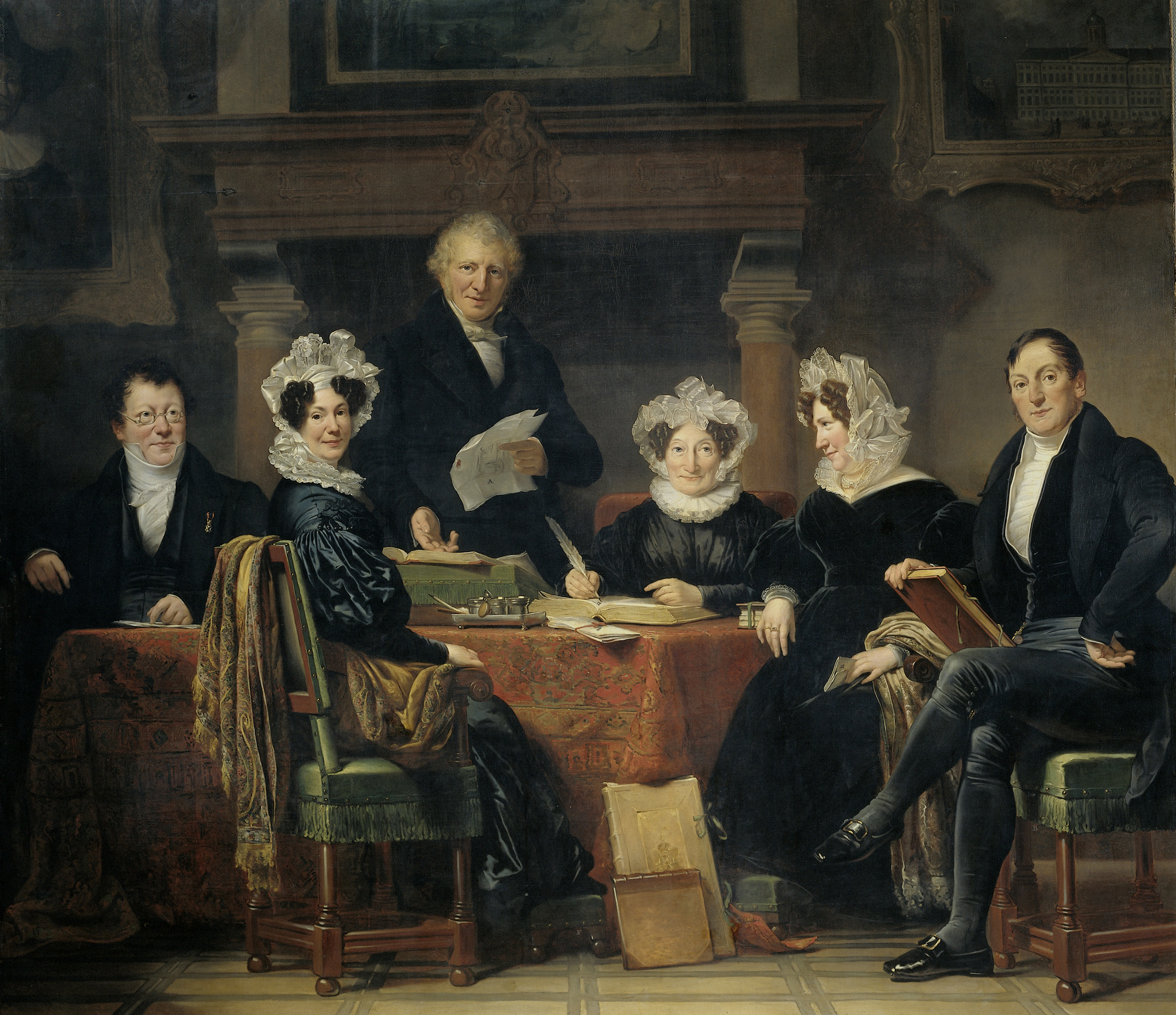
Regents of the Amsterdam
Leper Colony

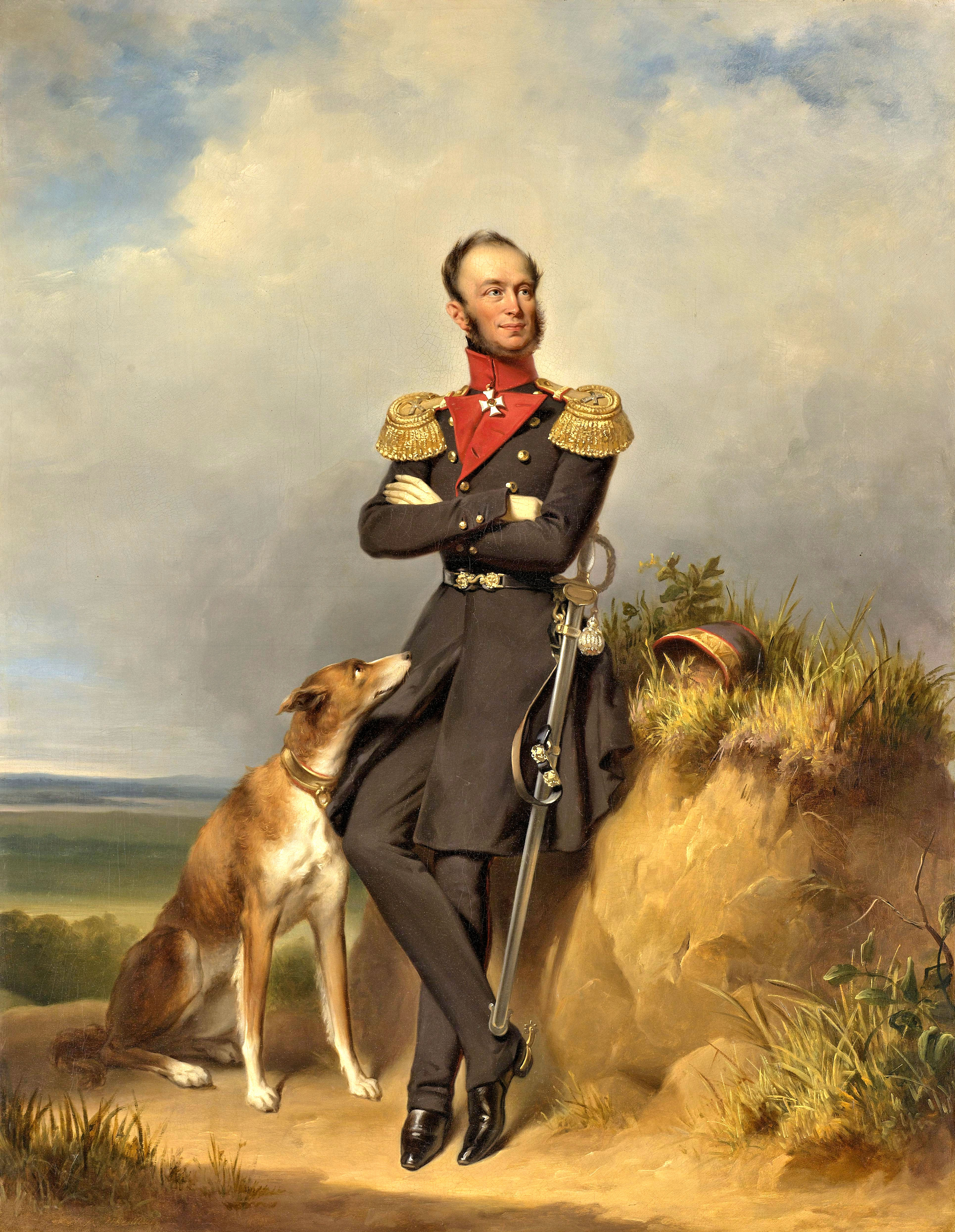
King William II

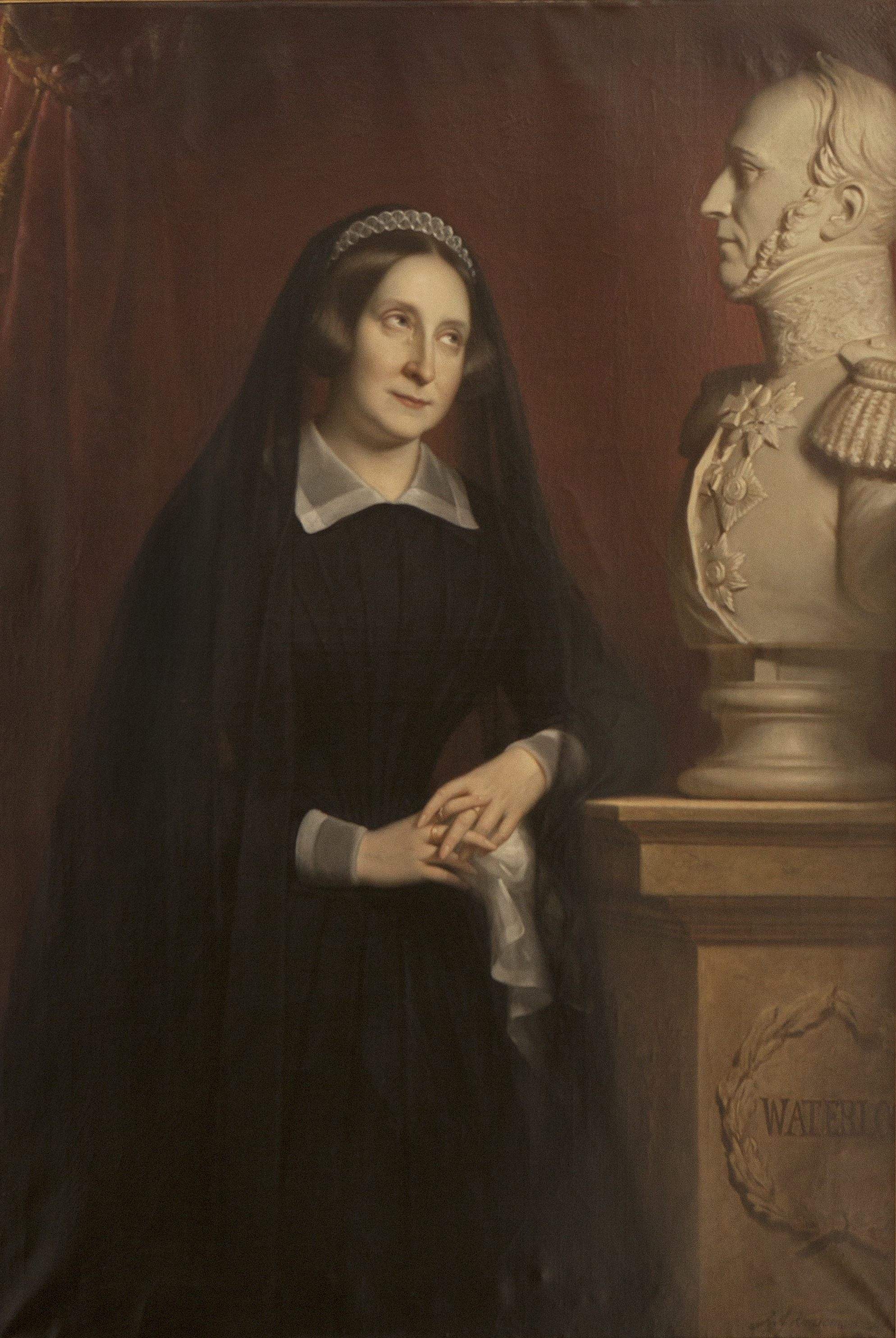
Anna Pavlovna as a widow

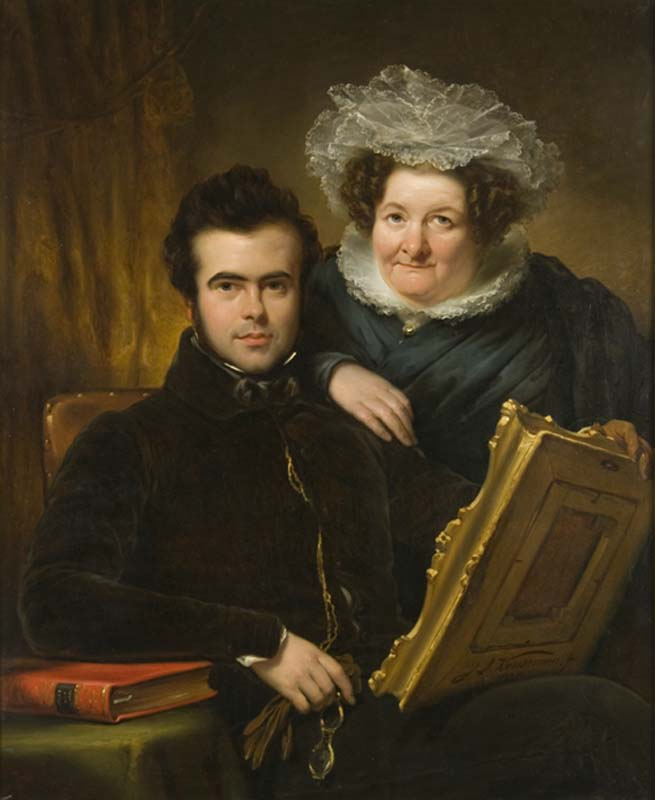
Double portrait of Isaac Lambertus van den Berch and Maria Cremer

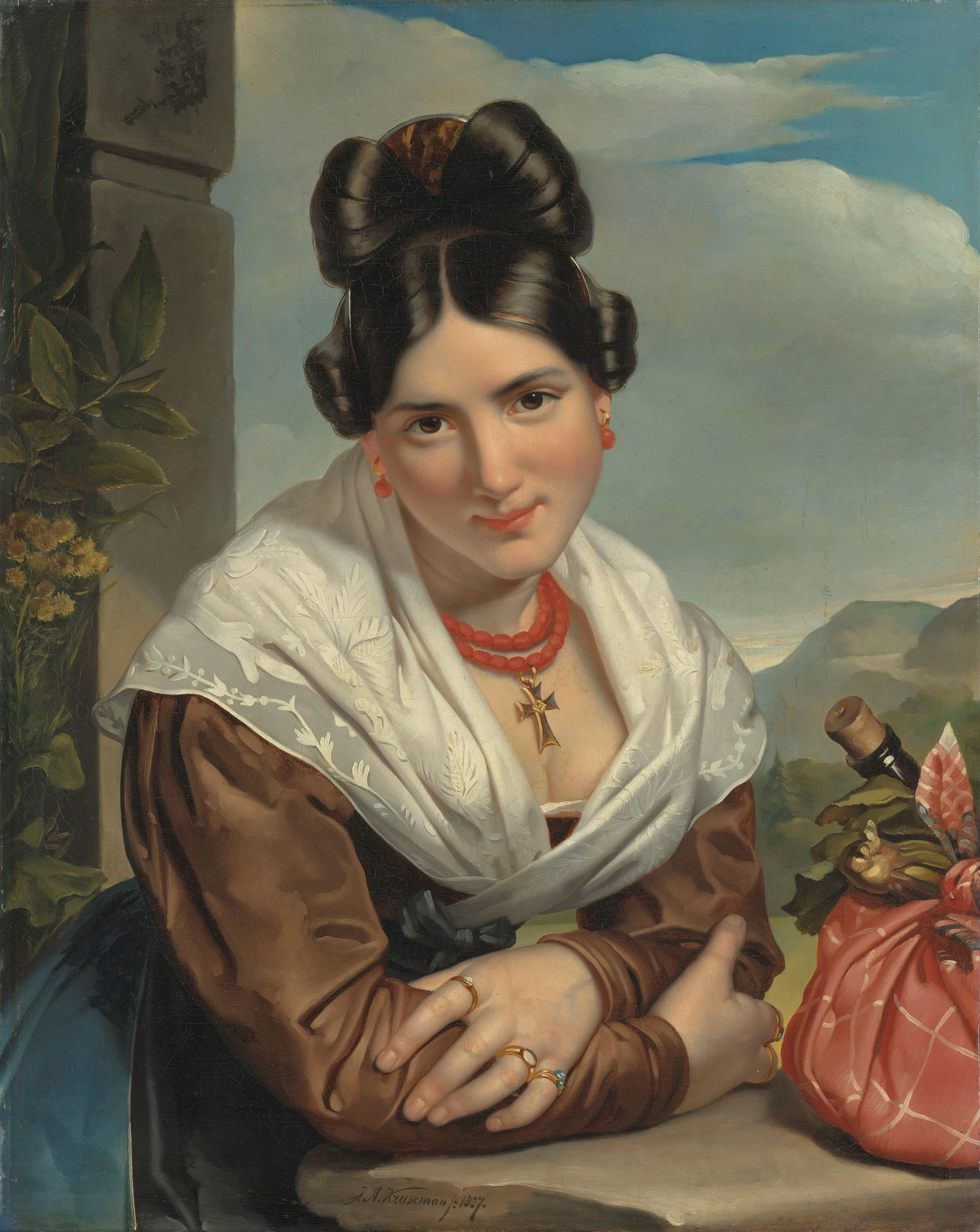
Resting girl

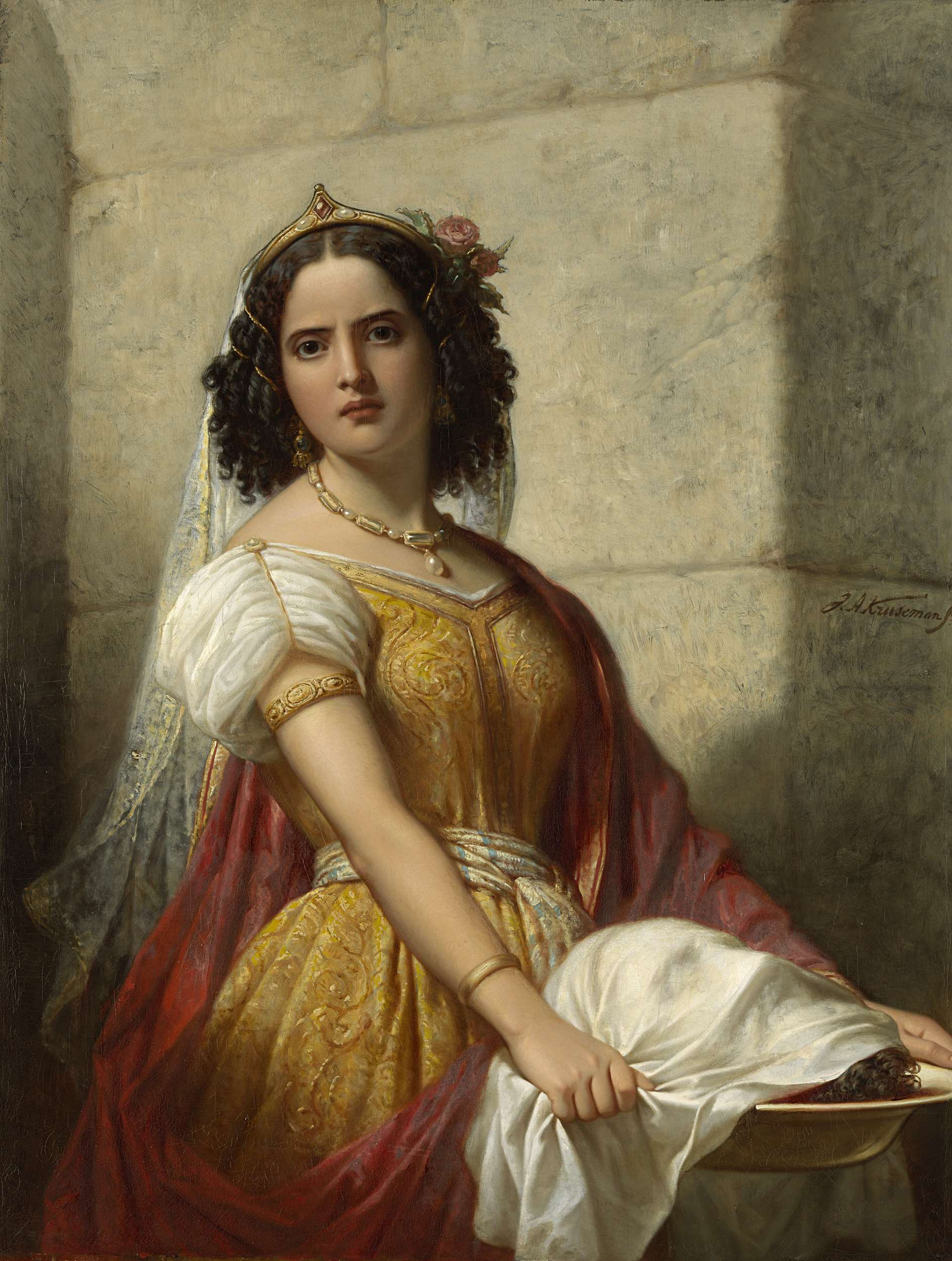
Salome with the head of St John the Baptist
