= Cornelis Kruseman =

Dutch painter (1797–1857)

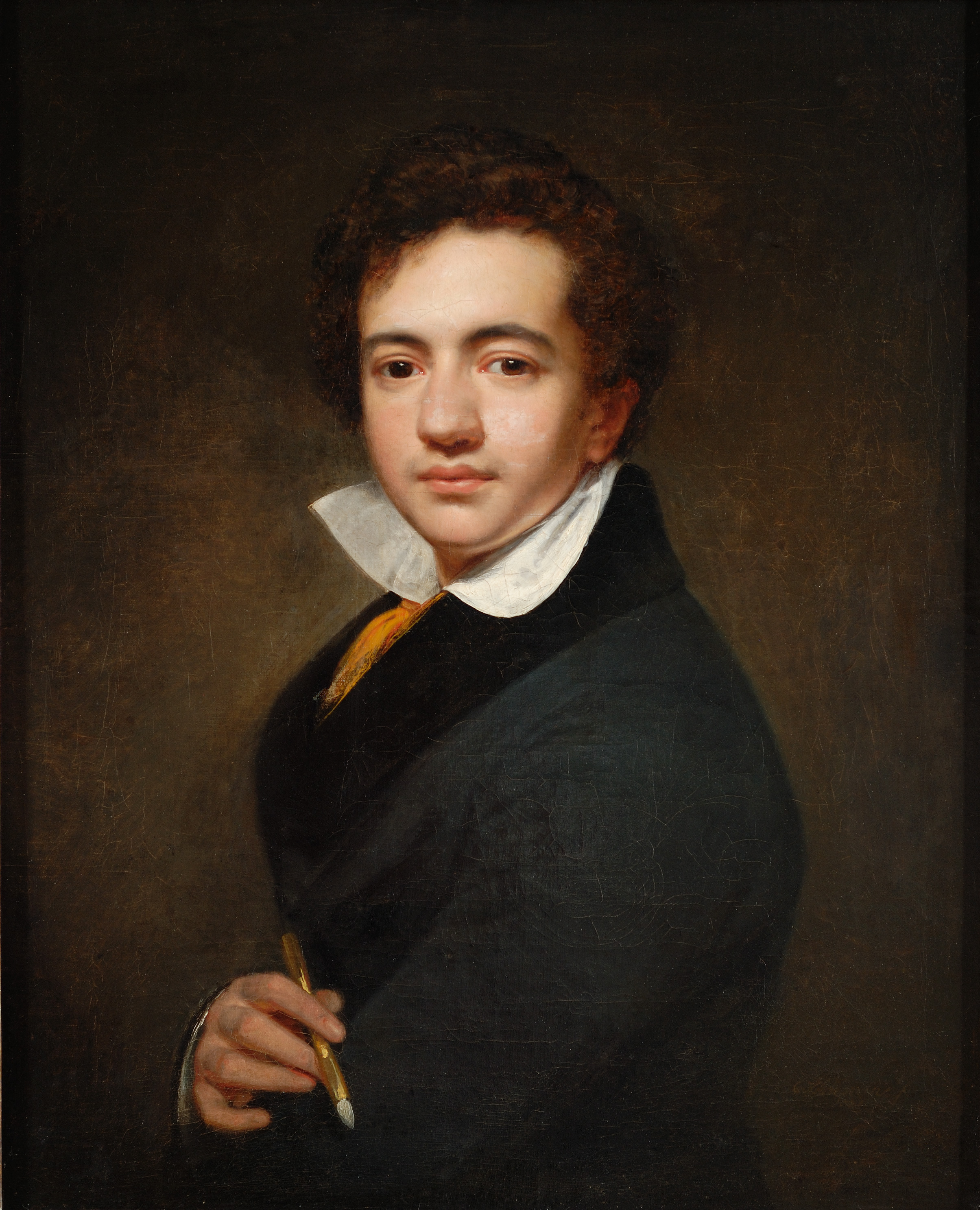
- Self-portrait (1812) at the age of 14/15
- Born: 25 September 1797; Amsterdam, Batavian Republic
- Died: 14 November 1857 (aged 60); Lisse, Netherlands
- Known for: Painting

Cornelis Kruseman (Dutch pronunciation: [kɔrˈneːlɪs ˈkrysəˌmɑn]; 25 September 1797 – 14 November 1857) was a Dutch painter, draughtsman, etcher, lithographer, silhouettist, paper-cut artist, and art collector. His works included portraits, biblical scenes, and depictions of Italian peasant life.

== Life ==
Cornelis Kruseman was born on 25 September 1797 in Amsterdam in the Batavian Republic (the present-day Netherlands) as the son of Alexander Hendrik Kruseman (1765–1829) and Cornelia Bötger. From the age of fourteen Cornelis Kruseman attended the Amsterdamse Tekenacademie and received tuition from Charles Howard Hodges (1764–1837) and Jean Augustin Daiwaille (1786–1850), as well as Petrus Antonius Ravelli (1788–1861).

Kruseman continued to live in Amsterdam until he travelled to Paris and Italy in 1821. He remained in Italy for four years, working with and learning from artists Jean-Victor Schnetz and Louis Léopold Robert. In 1825, after his return to the Netherlands, he settled in The Hague. In 1826 he published a travel account of his journey to Italy, entitled Aanteekeningen van C. Kruseman, betrekkelijk deszelfs kunstreis en verblijf in Italië.

On 3 October 1832 he married Henriette Angelique Meijer. In 1841 he left for Italy again, and remained there until 1848. Thus he is also called the "Italian Kruseman". From 1847 to 1854 he lived in The Hague, and after that in Lisse until his death.

Kruseman died at the age of 60 on 14 November 1857 in Lisse.

Some of his many students included his second cousin Jan Adam Kruseman (1804–1862), Herman Frederik Carel ten Kate (1822–1891), Adrianus Johannes Ehnle and Raden Saleh.

== Painting ==
Kruseman's oeuvre consists of portraits, biblical subjects and Italian scenes. He also painted a self-portrait in 1812, which hangs in the Museum Van Loon in Amsterdam. His painting 'The Legend' is on view in Teylers Museum in Haarlem.

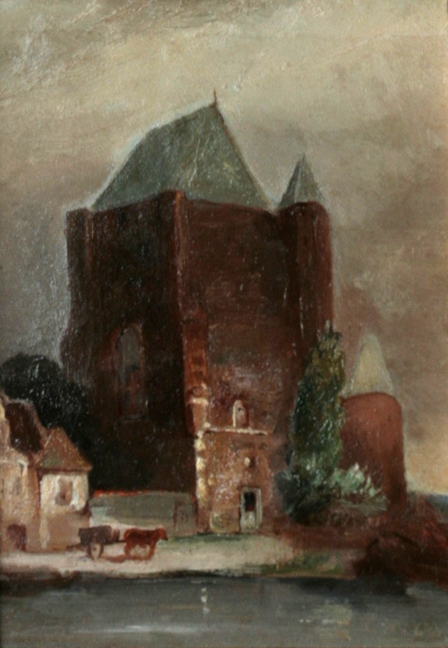
Tower near the water (before 1850)

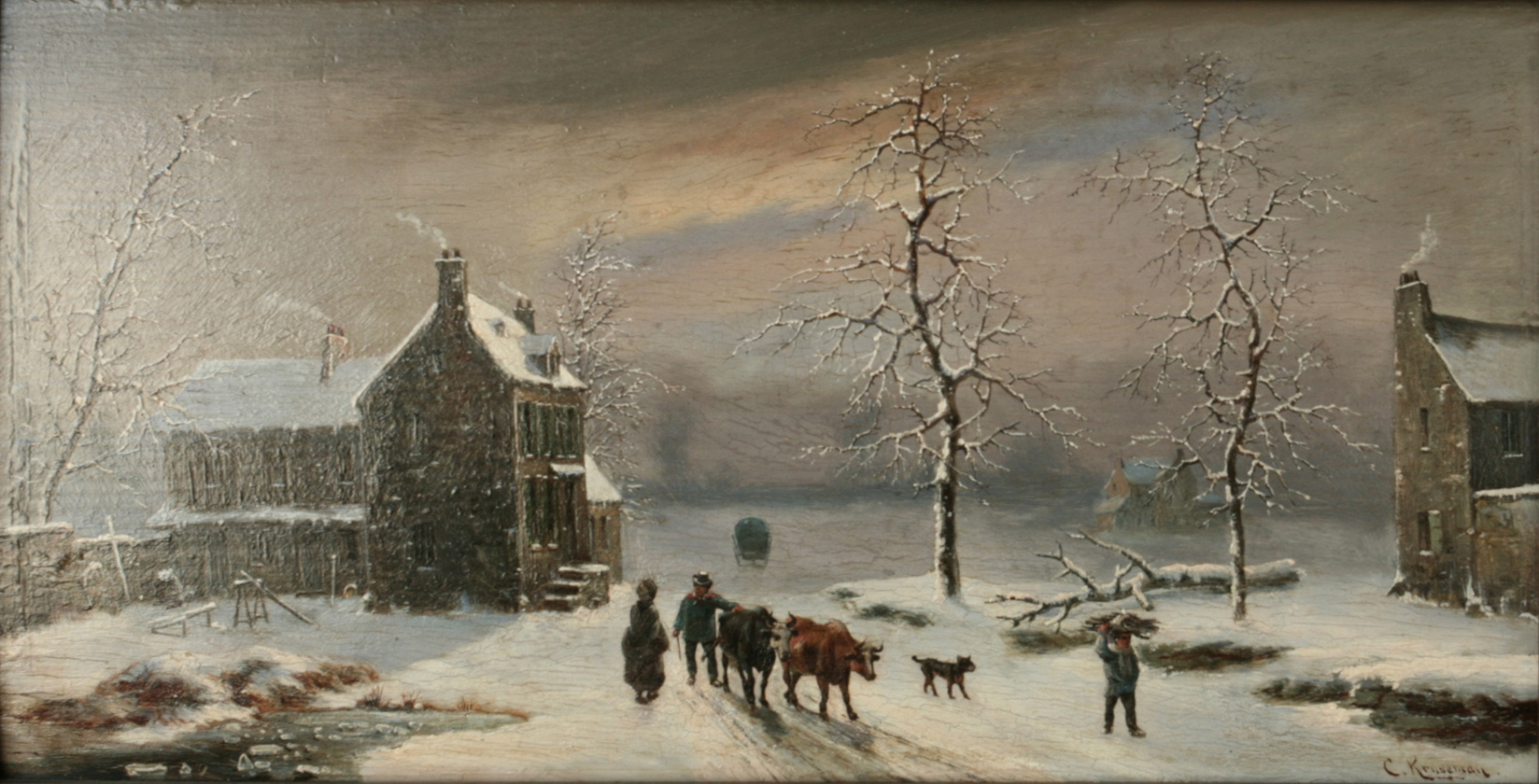
Winterlandscape with people and cows (before 1850)

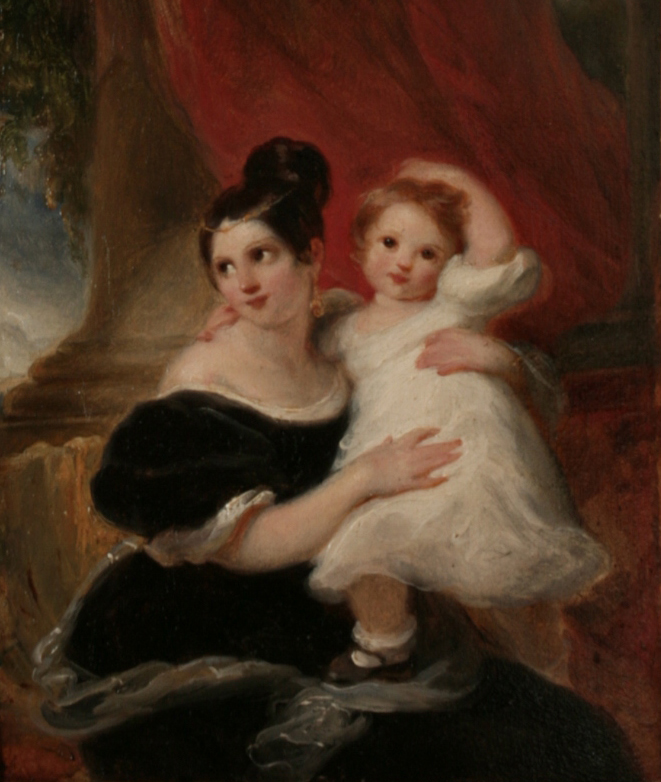
Mother and child (before 1850)

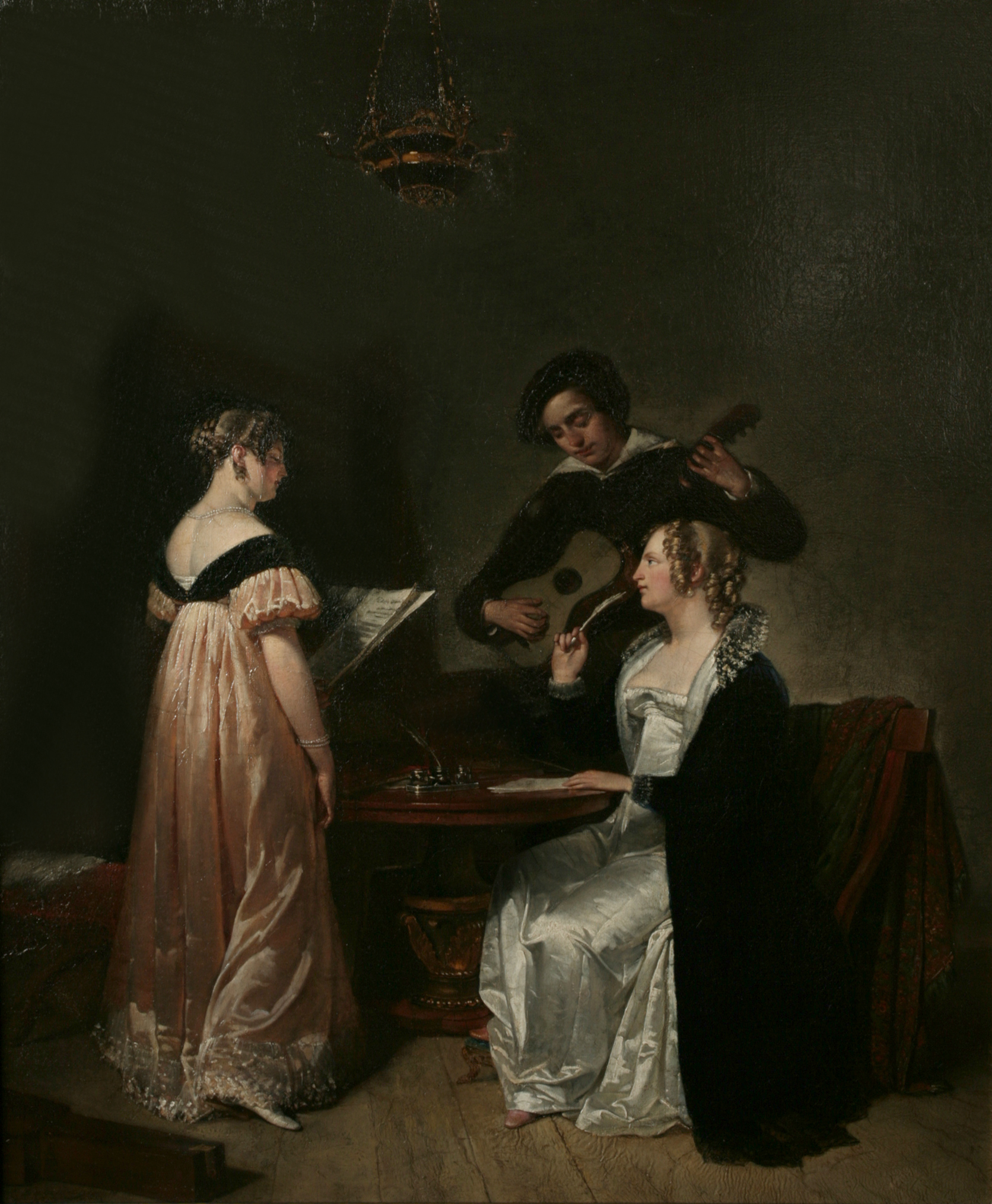
Interior with Sofie and Henriëtte Lotzen and the painter Kruseman, playing the guitar (1814)

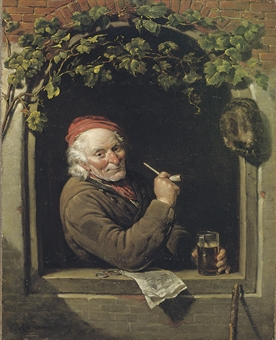
Man with a pipe (1817)

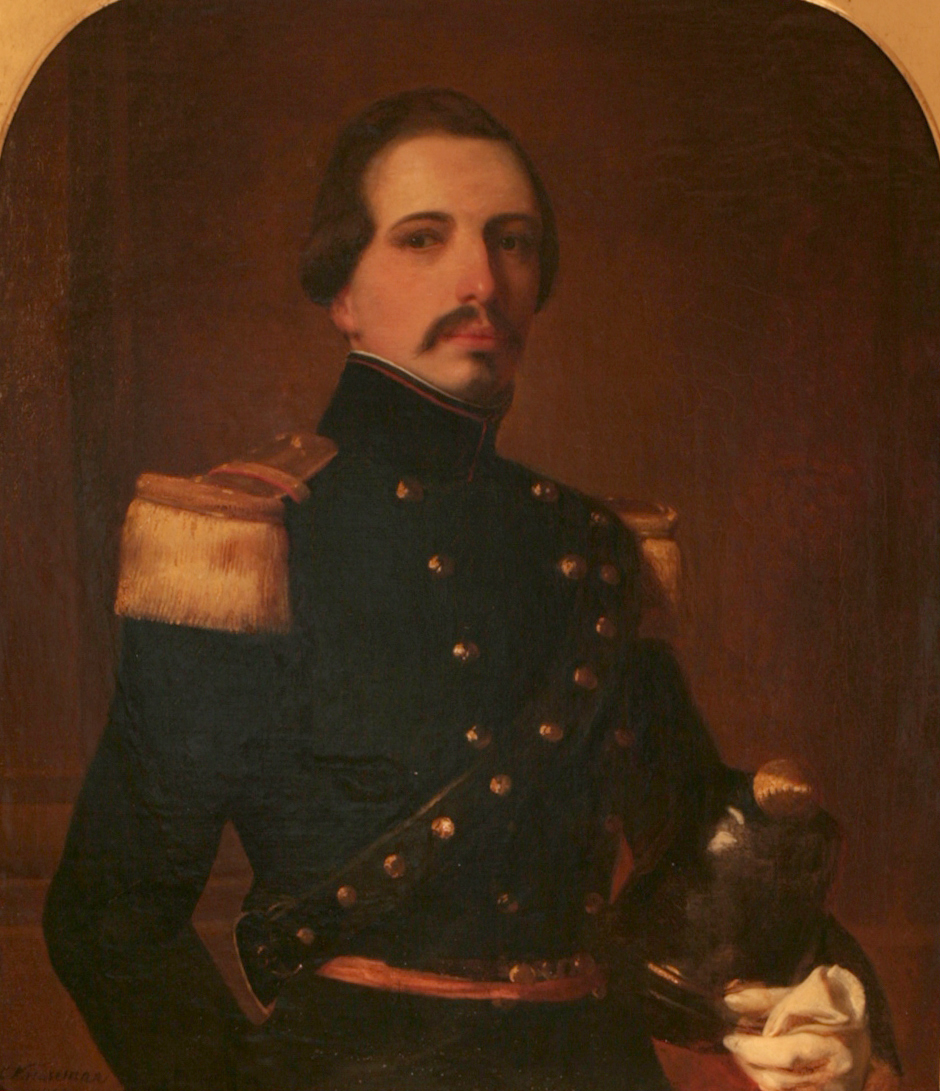
Portrait of Constant Gauttier Cathérine François Ising (before 1850)

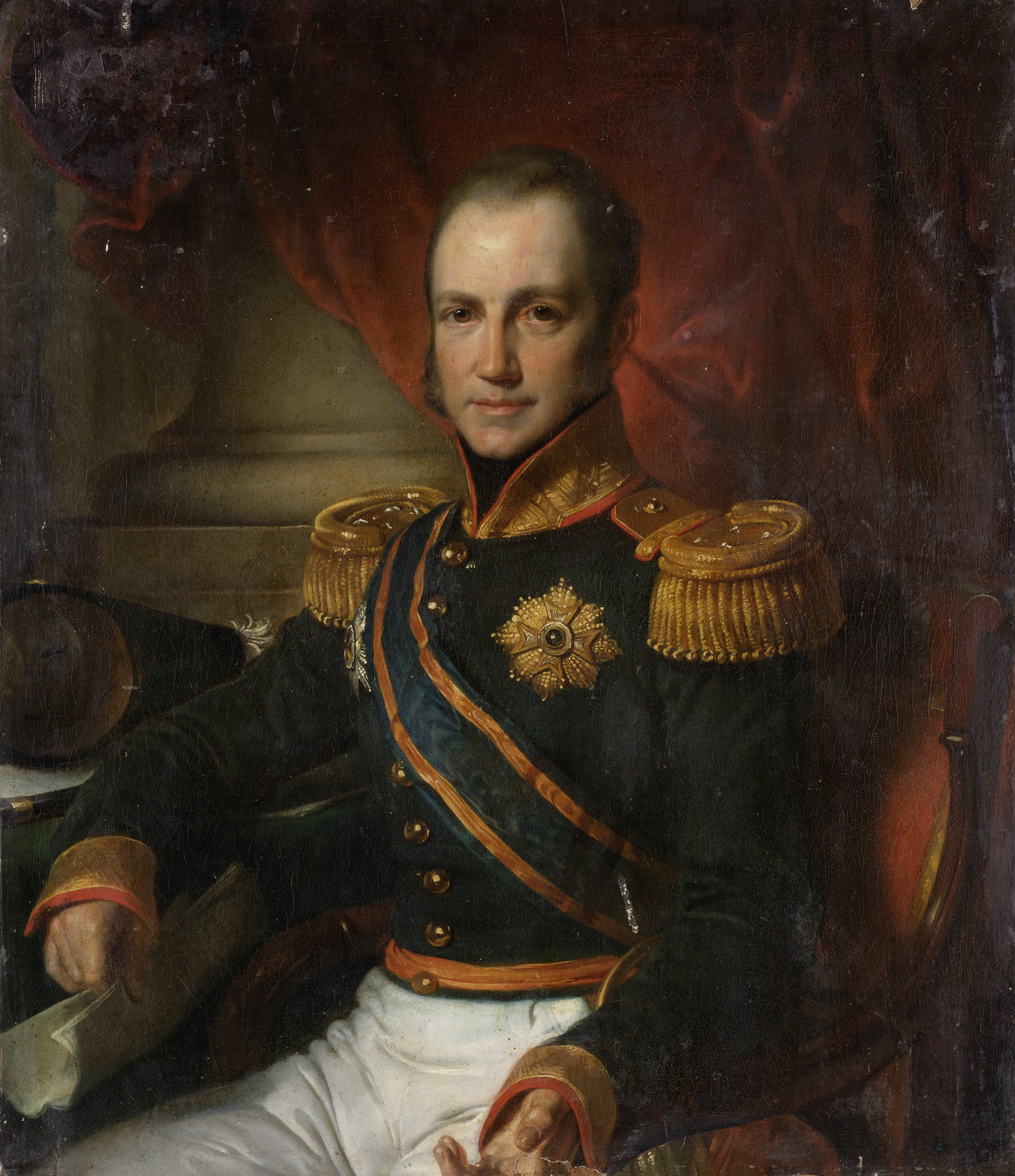
Portrait of Godart Alexander Gerard Philip Baron van der Capellen (c. 1816–1857)

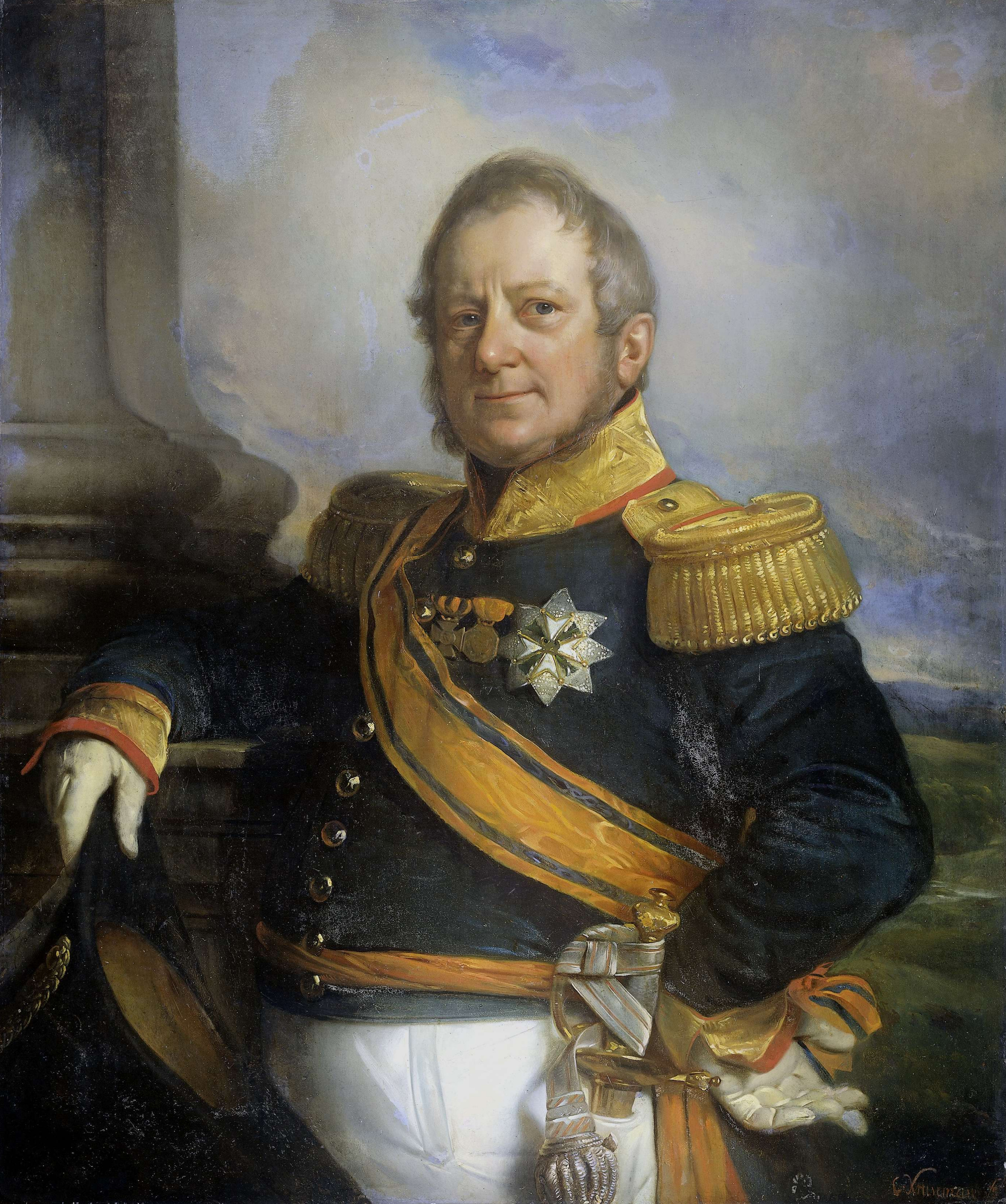
Portrait of Hendrik Merkus, Baron de Kock (c. 1826–1857)

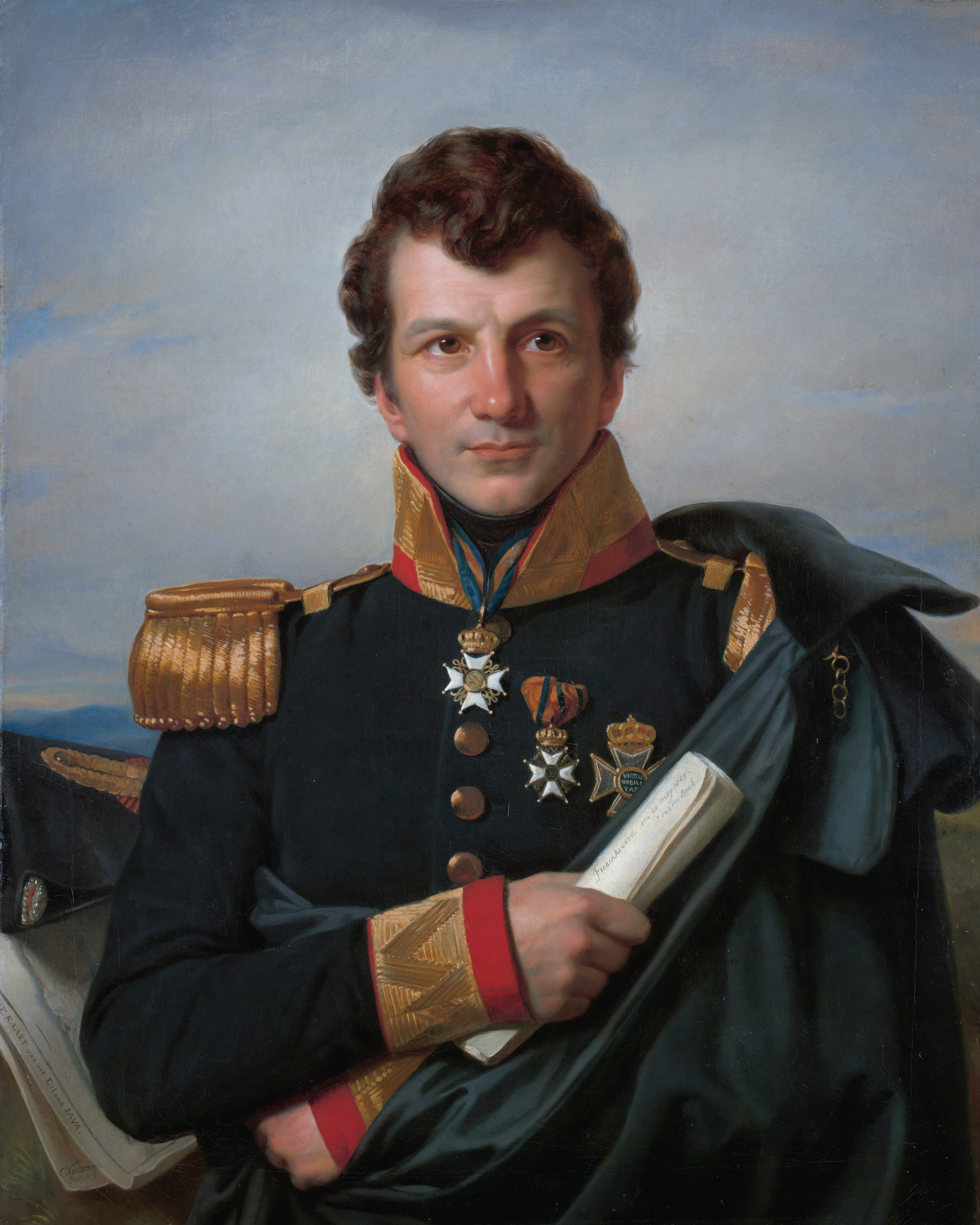
Portrait of Johannes van den Bosch (c. 1829)

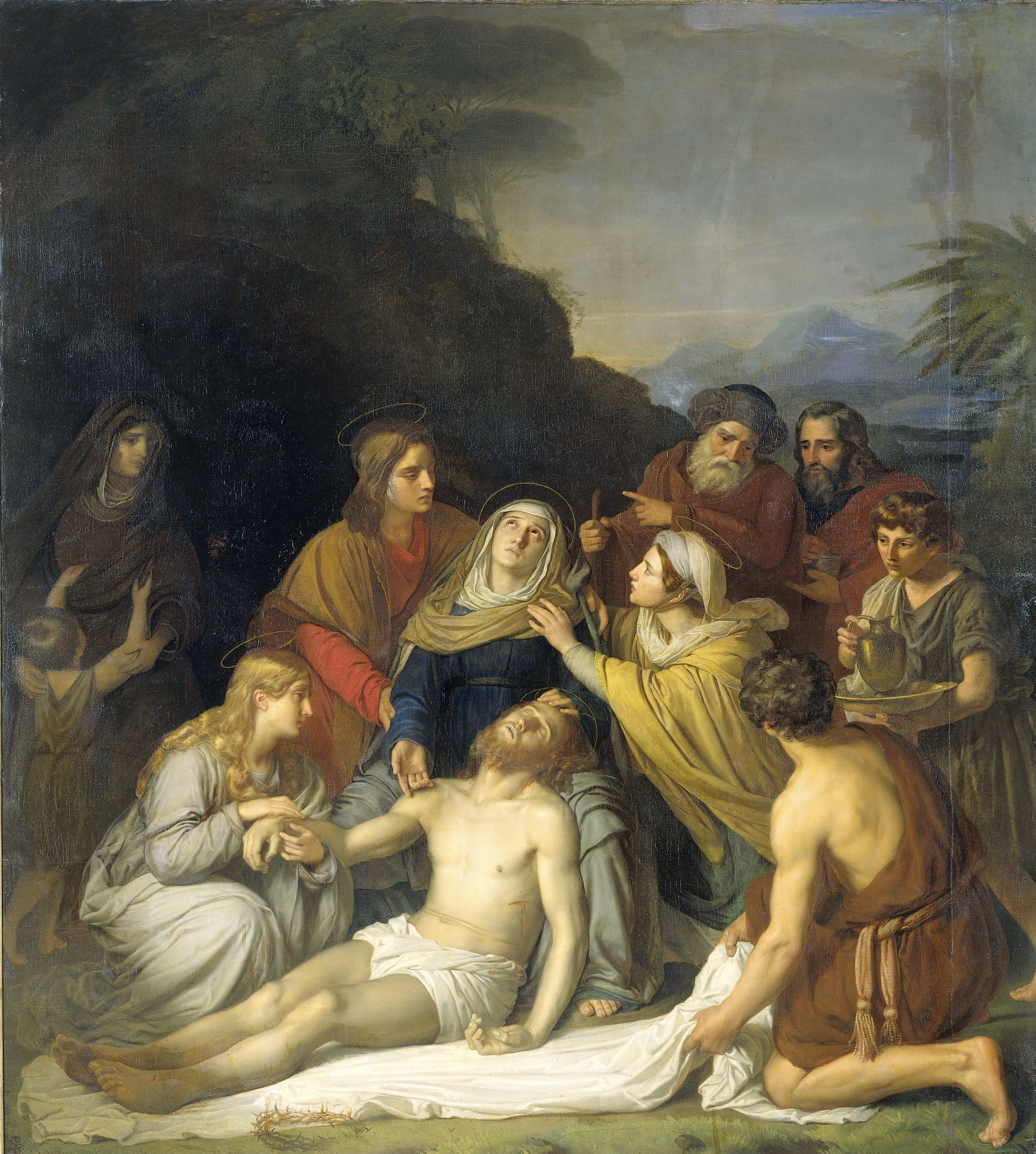
De graflegging Rijksmuseum SK-A-1066 (c. 1830)

== Collections ==
- Rijksmuseum Amsterdam
- Princeton University Art Museum
- Museum Van Loon
- Teylers Museum

== Legacy ==
In 1917, a street, the Cornelis Krusemanstraat, was named after him in Amsterdam, in 1954 in Eindhoven, and in 1956 in Leeuwarden. The Krusemanstraat in Ede was also named after Cornelis Kruseman, in 1981.

In 1996, Mrs J.M.C. Ising (19 July 1899 – 6 October 1996), a descendant of Johannes Diederik Kruseman (16 March 1794 – 13 January 1861), the brother of Cornelis Kruseman, established the foundation Cornelis Kruseman - J.M.C. Ising Stichting, the Cornelis Kruseman Stichting for short. The foundation's objective is to gain more recognition for the work of Cornelis Kruseman and his painting relatives.

== Honours ==
- Knight in the Order of the Netherlands Lion (Netherlands, 1831)
- Commander in the Order of the Oak Crown (Luxembourg, 1847)

== Bibliography ==
- Westrheene Wz., T. van (1859) "C. Kruseman, zijn leven en werken", Kunstkronijk 20 pp. 9–16.
- Heteren, M. van, Meere, J. de (1998) Fredrik Marinus Kruseman (1816–1882) Painter of pleasing landscapes, Schiedam: Scriptum, p. 112.
