= Poortvliet (surname) =

Poortvliet (Dutch pronunciation: [ˈpoːrtflit]) and van Poortvliet are Dutch surnames that may refer to:

- Jack van Poortvliet (born 2001), English rugby union player
- Jan Poortvliet (born 1955), Dutch football defender
- Johannes Tak van Poortvliet (1839–1904), Dutch politician
- Marie Tak van Poortvliet (1871–1936), Dutch collector and patron of modern art and art critic
- Rien Poortvliet (1932–1995), Dutch draughtsman and painter

== See also ==
- Poortvliet, a village in the Dutch province of Zeeland
