= By the Sea =

By the Sea may refer to:

- By the Sea (1915 film), an American silent film by Charlie Chaplin
- By the Sea (1982 film), a British TV film by Bill Wilson
- By the Sea (2015 film), an American film by Angelina Jolie
- By the Sea (novel), a 2001 novel by Abdulrazak Gurnah
- By the Sea (painting), a 1909 painting by Piet Mondrian
- By-the-Sea, home of August Belmont in Newport, Rhode Island
- "By the Sea", a song by Suede on their 1996 album Coming Up
- "By the Sea", a song by Euphoria on their 2001 album Beautiful My Child

== See also ==
- By the Beautiful Sea (song), lyrics include "By the Sea, By the Sea, By the Beautiful Sea"
- By the Sea, By the Sea, By the Beautiful Sea, a 1995 trilogy of three short plays by Terrence McNally, Lanford Wilson, and Joe Pintauro
