= Willem Zeylmans van Emmichoven =

Dutch psychiatrist and anthroposophist (1893–1961)

Frederik Willem Zeylmans van Emmichoven
- Born: Frederik Willem Zeylmans van Emmichoven; 23 November 1893; Helmond Netherlands
- Died: 18 November 1961 (aged 67); Cape Town, South Africa
- Occupations: Psychiatrist, lecturer, general secretary Anthroposophical Society
- Known for: Lecturer, author
- Spouse: Ingeborg Droogleever Fortuyn

Frederik Willem Zeylmans van Emmichoven (November 23, 1893 – November 18, 1961) was a Dutch psychiatrist and anthroposophist. From 1923 until his death in 1961 he was chairman of the Dutch Anthroposophical Society. He was a familiar figure in public life and had a considerable influence on the anthroposophic movement, particularly through his numerous lectures and his work as an author, which included the first biography of Rudolf Steiner.

== Life ==
Frederik Willem Zeylmans van Emmichoven was the son of a Dutch chocolate manufacturer. His mother came from Germany. He was born in Helmond Netherlands. In childhood he was often troubled by visions of colour and emotional turmoil that later stimulated his preoccupation with colour. After recovering from an attack of typhoid, he entered medical school at eighteen, specialising in psychiatry. His interest in colour, inspired by the painter Jacoba van Heemskerck and her friend and patron Marie Tak van Poortvliet, led him to research the effects of colours on the life of feeling. He continued his medical studies in Leipzig under Wilhelm Wundt in 1919, where he became a member of the Anthroposophical Society. After meeting with Rudolf Steiner, the latter encouraged his further research into the effect of colours and his dissertation he wrote on The effect of colors on the feeling. On 27 September 1921 he was married to Ingeborg Droogleever Fortuyn, whom he had met for the first time many years earlier. Their first son was born in 1926.

At the age of 28, Zeylmans began lecturing on Anthroposophy to an interested public and academic colleagues. He helped establish the first Waldorf School in The Hague, where he also founded a small psychiatric hospital, which soon moved into its own building (now the Rudolf Steiner Zorg). When the Anthroposophical Society was founded in the Netherlands, Rudolf Steiner appointed him as its first General Secretary. In addition to his psychiatric work Zeylmans undertook worldwide lecture tours. He spoke often about the effect of color on humans and gave advice to paint manufacturers, architects, directors of museums and artists.

Zeylman’s primary concerns were the rapprochement and understanding between the different nations and peoples themselves, as well as a furtherance of cosmopolitanism. His attempt to found the global schools association suggested by Rudolf Steiner (a "Weltschulverein"), to promote the dissemination and free funding for free school education, failed due mainly to resistance from anthroposophic circles against fostering broader public awareness. In the face of increasing political fanaticism, another initiative Zeylmans took was to further interest for anthroposophy in European youth. In the summer of 1930 he organized a youth camp on the Stakenberg near Nunspeet in the Veluwe. More than a thousand participants gathered in working groups and heard lectures by leading anthroposophists like Eugen Kolisko, Walter Johannes Stein, Elisabeth Vreede and Ita Wegman on their thoughts to the situation of the time.

His work, however, was increasingly restricted by political developments. His involvement with the administration of the General Anthroposophical Society in Dornach, Switzerland also met with increasing disapproval. The internal disputes since the death of Rudolf Steiner and his close collaboration with the physician Ita Wegman in 1935 led to his exclusion and that of the majority of the Dutch members.

After the war Zeylmans took up once again his international lecturing work. In 1954 he embarked on a global tour for nine months. Encouraged by Bernard Lievegoed, in 1960 he sought a mandate from the members of the Anthroposophical Society in the Netherlands to reunite it once more, after 25 years of separation, with the General Anthroposophical Society at the Goetheanum in Switzerland. He undertook a second journey through South Africa in 1961, visiting the newly established Waldorf schools and other institutions to give advice and hold lectures. During this trip, he died unexpectedly in Cape Town.

== Written work ==
A selection of Zeylman’s works in English.

- The Reality in which We Live: An Introduction to Rudolf Steiner's Spiritual Science New Knowledge Books, 1964 ISBN 9780850610086
- The human soul in sleeping, dreaming, and waking Sun Pub Co June 1988 ISBN 9780895401779
- The Anthroposophical Understanding of the Soul SteinerBooks 1983 ISBN 9781621510765
- The Foundation Stone Clairview Books October 2002 ISBN 978-1902636375
- The Secret World: An Epos Translated by Truus Geraets, St. George Publications, 1980
- America and Americanism St. George Publications; first edition 1986 ISBN 978-0916786823

== Literature ==
- Willem Zeylmans Van Emmichoven: An Inspiration for Anthroposophy, a Biography by Emanuel Zeylamans Temple Lodge Publishing; First English edition (2 Oct. 2002) ISBN 978-1902636351
- SV Petersen: Meditations on the brink - Dedicated with reverence to the life and work of Willem Zeylmans van Emmichoven. With 12 illustrations by Adelbert Zeylmans, Zeist 1962
