= By the Sea (painting) =

1909 Painting by Dutch Artist Piet Mondrian

By The Sea
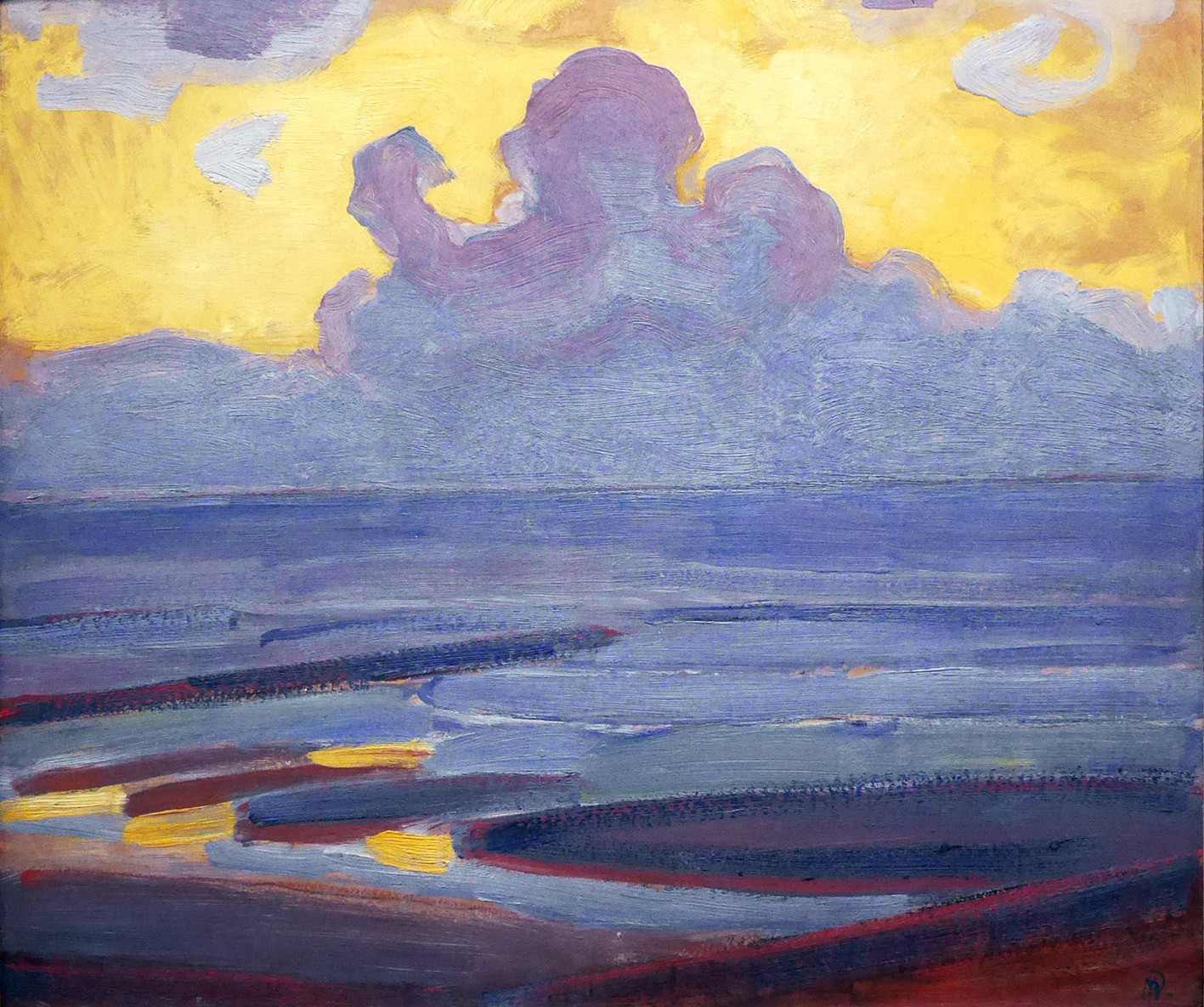
- Artist: Piet Mondrian
- Year: 1909
- Catalogue: 462, no. A 696, ill
- Medium: oil on cardboard
- Movement: Hague School/Neoplasticism
- Subject: Seascape of Domburg, Zeeland
- Dimensions: 40 cm × 45.7 cm (15 3/4 in × 18 in)
- Location: Yale University Art Gallery, New Haven
- Accession: 1972.93
- Website: https://artgallery.yale.edu/collections/objects/9795

By the Sea is an oil on cardboard painting by Dutch artist Piet Mondrian created in 1909. Currently owned by the Yale University Art Gallery, the painting depicts a seascape from a vacationing spot in Domburg, Zeeland, Netherlands. With its vibrant colors, the painting presents an intermediate phase of Mondrian's painting career from Hague School Realism to Neoplasticism.

== Provenance ==
The painting was acquired by Yale in 1972 (Accession 1972.93), donated by alumni Bruce Dayton.

== Description ==
In 1905, Mondrian's painting style began to transition towards Neoplasticism when he visited a retrospective of Post-Impressionist Vincent van Gogh at the Stedelijk Museum Amsterdam, where he was inspired by van Gogh's use of bold colors. Works like Evening; Red Tree (1908) are examples of his use of color.

In the early 20th century, Domburg, Zeeland became a popular vacationing spot amongst Dutch artists, who were inspired by the landscape, and bright lighting of the beaches. Alongside Mondrian, Jan Toorop, and Jacoba van Heemskerck stayed in the town, painting the sea, the beaches, and town.

Mondrian visited Domburg in 1908, staying at the Loverendale Villa, the summer home of van Heemskerck and Marie Tak van Poortvliet, where he painted various landscapes. He later returned in 1909 with his friend Corenlis Spoor.

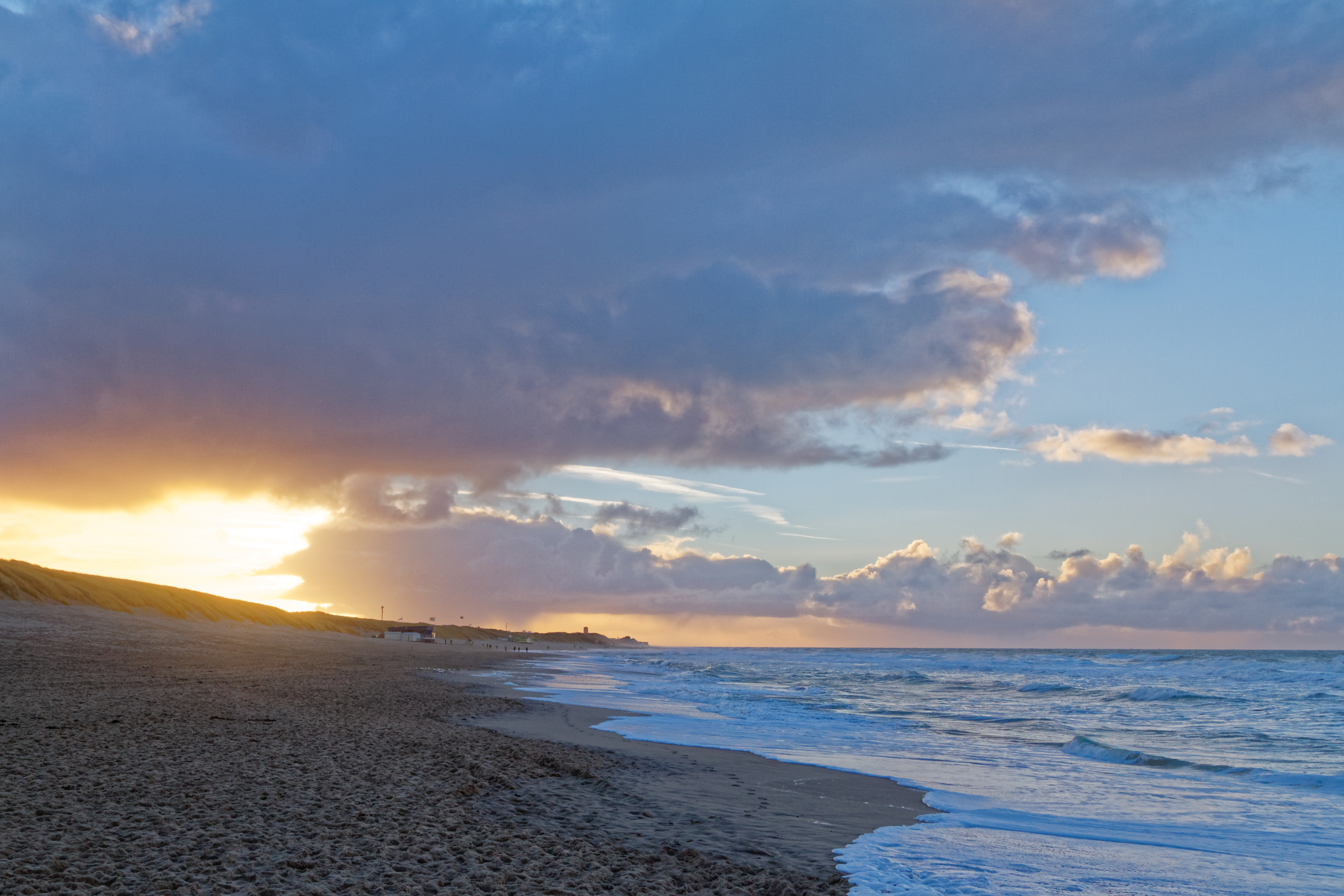
Zeeland Beach (2017)

By the Sea differs from his earlier Hague School paintings starting with the shape of the canvas, which is more square, typical to that of his later signature works. The painting is void of people, and emphasizes the seascape with the contrasts of the sea and sky, bisected in the middle, horizontally. The yellow sky is blocked by a central cloud in the painting. The colors of the sky shift from the realistic towards the abstract with bold colors, to emphasize a spiritual essence.

Mondrian would fully transition to Neoplasticism in 1917, and in 1919 said of his transition:

I expressed myself by means of nature. But if you carefully observe the sequence of my work, you will see that it progressively abandoned the naturalistic appearance of things and increasingly emphasized the plastic expression of relationships.
