= Jacob Eduard van Heemskerck van Beest =

Dutch painter

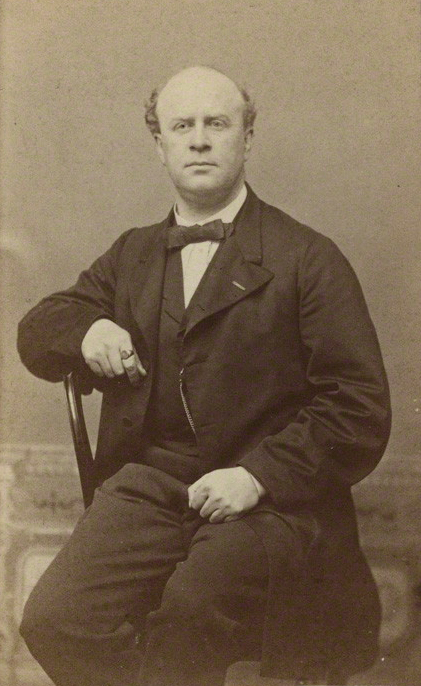
Jacob Eduard van Heemskerck van Beest (1870s)

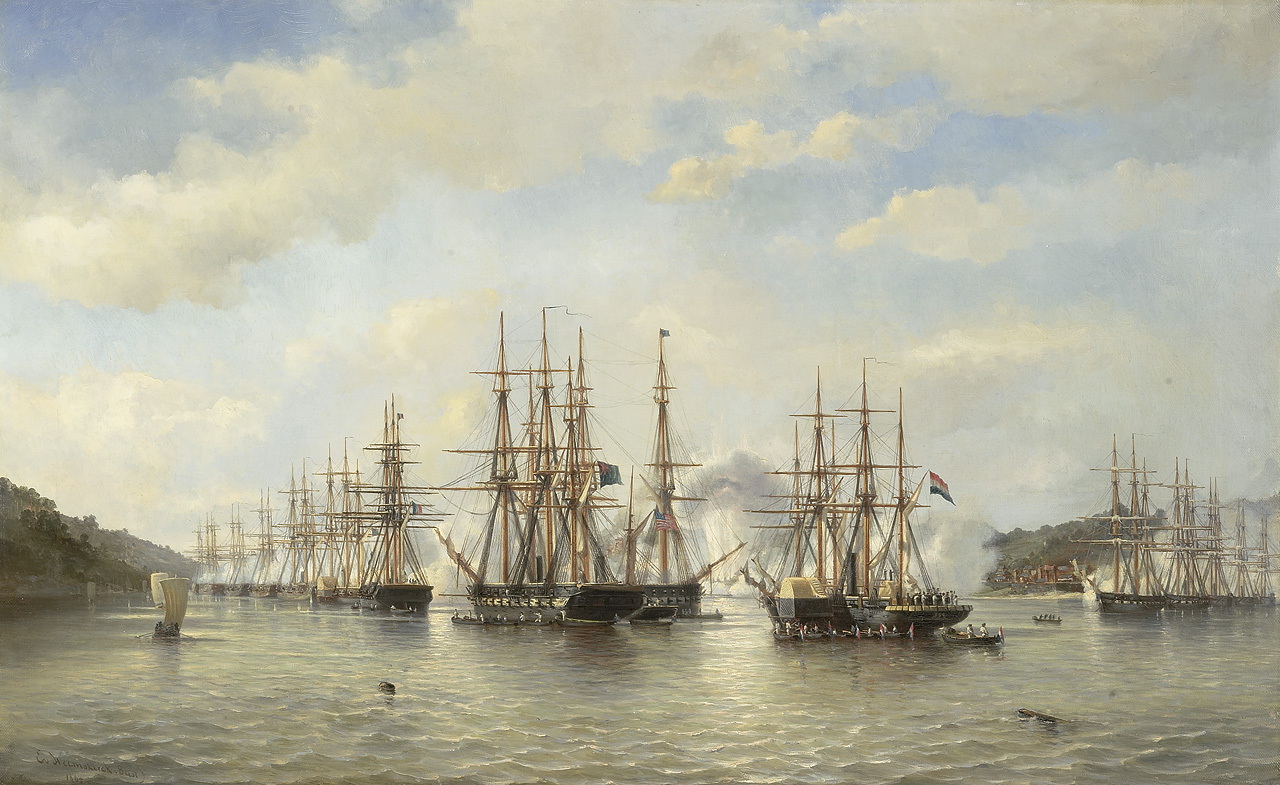
Dutch, English, French and American squadrons in Japanese waters, 1864

Jkhr. Jacob Eduard van Heemskerck van Beest (Dutch pronunciation: [ˈjaːkɔp ˈeːdyʋɑrt fɑn ˈɦeːmskɛr(ə)k fɑm ˈbeːst]; (Note: In isolation, van is pronounced [vɑn].) 28 February 1828 – 24 December 1894) was a Dutch painter.

== Biography ==
Jacob Eduard van Heemskerck van Beest was born on 28 February 1828 in Kampen in the United Kingdom of the Netherlands. He was the son of a sea captain, Dirk van Heemskerck van Beest, and followed his father to join the Dutch navy at the age of 14. He served in the navy from 1842 to 1853 before resigning and moving to Utrecht where he became a painter, focusing on naval historical pictures and general shipping scenes. He was a pupil of Dirk van Lokhorst, a notable painter of the Dutch modern school.

In 1867, Van Heemskerck van Beest moved to The Hague where he became a member of the "De Witte" society in 1872. He then lived in Dalfsen between 1879 and 1885. He was the first teacher of his daughter, the painter Jacoba van Heemskerck. He died at the age of 66 in The Hague on 24 December 1894.

== Gallery ==
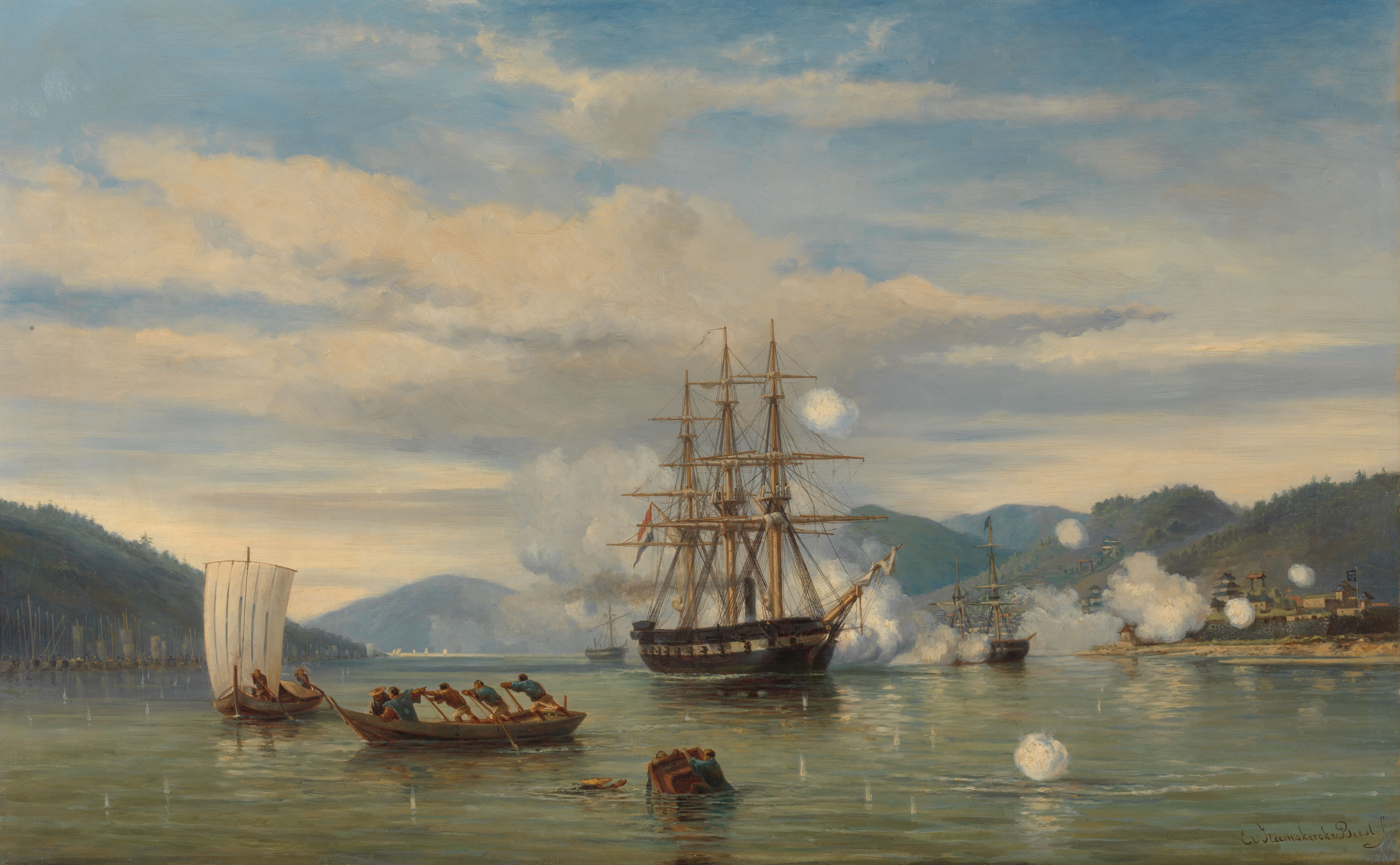
ZM Steamship Medusa forces the entrance to the Strait of Simonoseki between Kioe-Sjioe and Hondo (Japan)

A plantation camp of slaves in Surinam, with Gerard Voorduin, 1860-1862

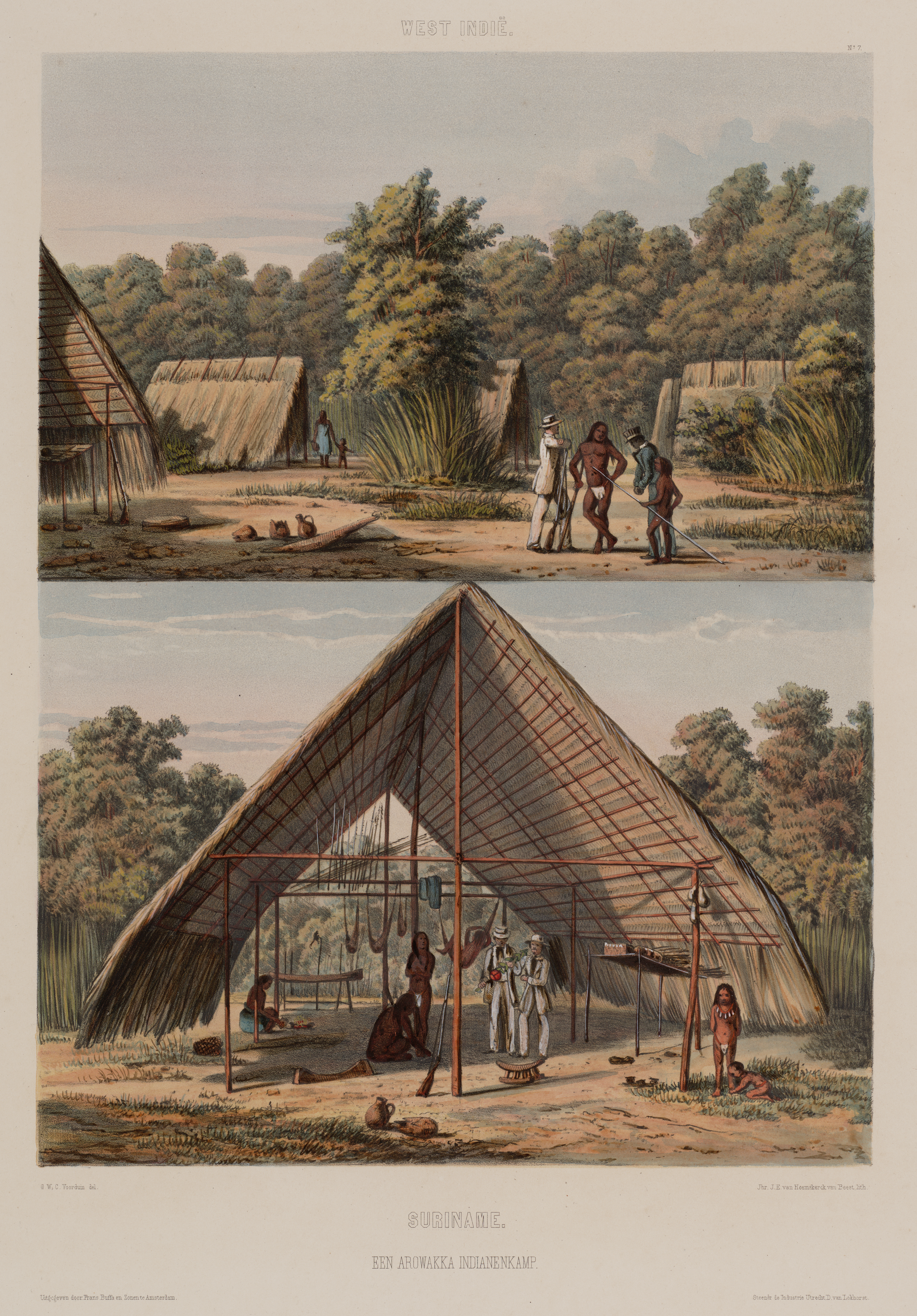
An Arowakka Indian camp, with Gerard Voorduin, 1860-1862

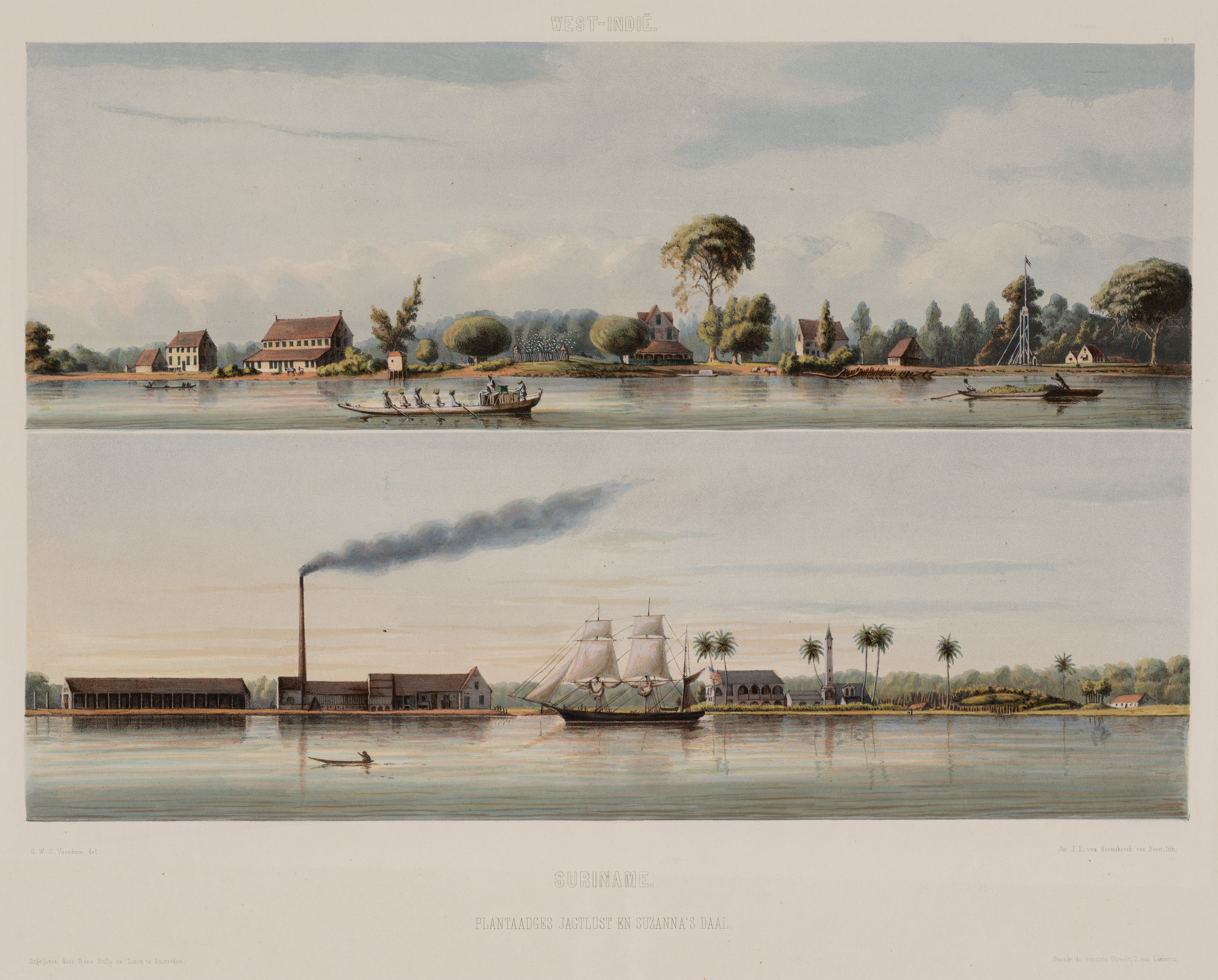
Views of plantations on the river Surinam. Jagtlust and Suzanna's Daal, with Gerard Voorduin, 1860-1862

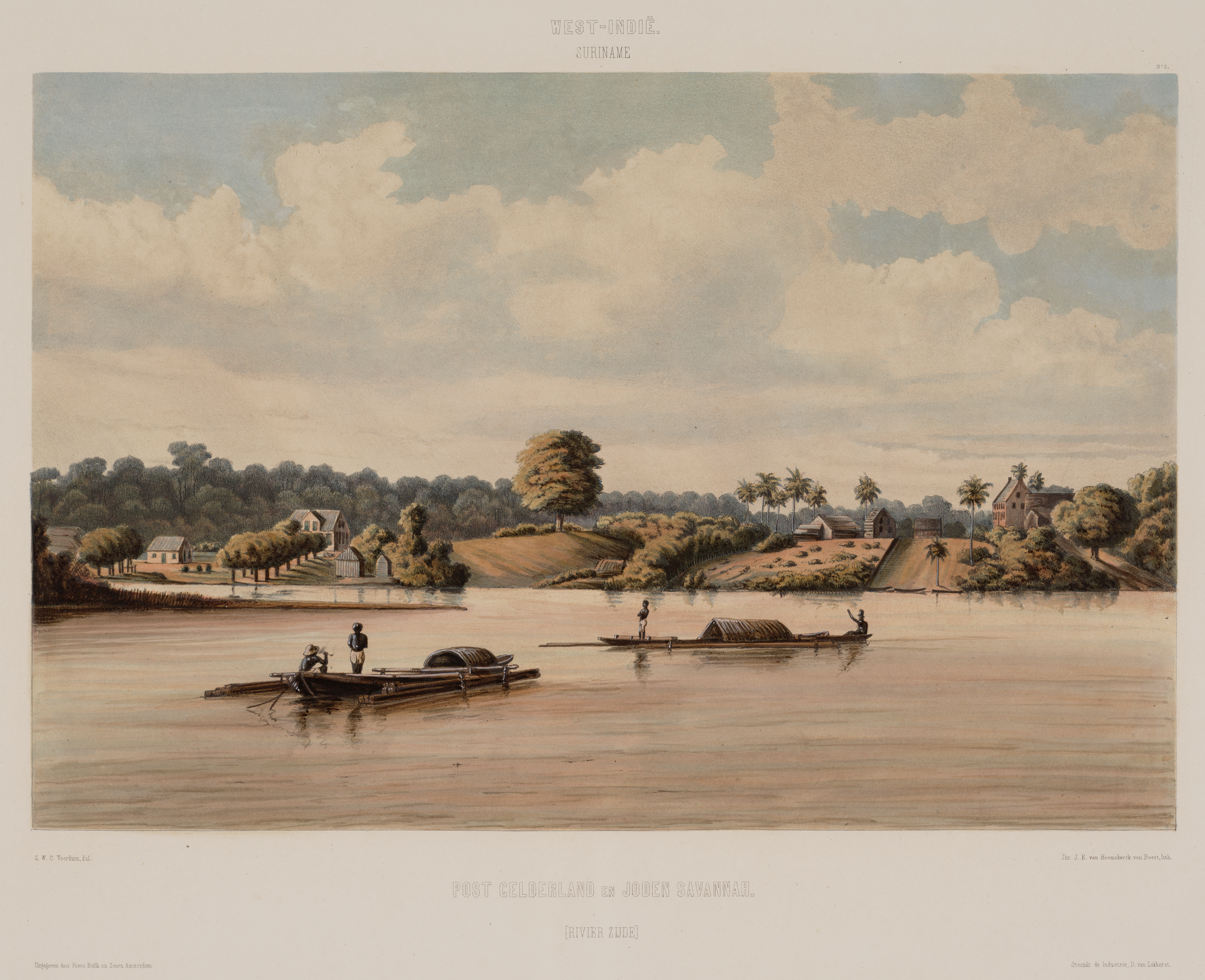
Post Gelderland and Jews Savannah, Suriname, with Gerard Voorduin, 1860-1862
