= Sydney Vernon Petersen =

South African poet (1914–1987)

- Born: 22 June 1914
- Died: 30 October 1987 (aged 73)
- Writing career
- Genre: Poetry

S. V. Petersen (22 June 1914 – 30 October 1987) was an Afrikaans-language South African poet and author, educator and founding principal of the Athlone High School, Silvertown Athlone, Cape Town. He was the first person of colour whose poetry and prose were published in South Africa.

== Life and work ==
Sydney Vernon Petersen was born on 22 June 1914 in Riversdale, a town in the south of the Western Cape Province of South Africa. He was the second child in a family of five children, of which all five later became teachers. His father was a saddler and harness maker, his mother a homemaker. Motivated mainly by their mother all of the children obtained, at least, their degree in Education. Petersen visited the local Berlin Mission School until 1926, completing his schooling in Cape Town at the Trafalgar High School. He excelled in athletics and sports throughout his student days. During his final year in high school a pastor, Reverend Kohl of the Lutheran Mission Church, he felt, had a particularly good influence on his personal development. At this time there were very limited opportunities for children of colour to obtain a proper schooling (in 1929 only around 600 children were enrolled in high school within the Union of South Africa) and it was a great achievement, despite these limitations, for him to obtain such results, made possible through his strong personal drive and the support of his parents and people like Reverend Kohl. As a young child, he made daily deliveries of bread and as a teenager did manual labour for a living and contribute to its training costs.

On completing school, he studied at the Battswood Training College, Wynberg, where he qualified as a teacher in 1933. His first teaching post was in Ladismith in the Cape Province. Two years later he was back in Cape Town teaching at the Berlin Mission School in Searle Street District Six. He began attending evening classes at the University of Cape Town for his bachelor's degree with majors in Afrikaans, English and Mathematics, befriending the Afrikaans poet I.D. du Plessis. On graduating in 1940 he obtained the University Medal for Afrikaans. Later he obtained a BEd degree from the same university. As a teacher, he served from 1939 as an assistant in the secondary school Battswood, while lecturing in the Training College Battswood and from 1945 as head of the same institution's primary school. In January 1947, he founded the Athlone High School where he remained principal until his retirement in 1974. After his retirement, he accepted a temporary post in the Department of Education at the Hewat Education College in Crawford and in 1981 he lectured at the Teacher Training College in Bellville, where he was employed until 1983. His wife, Mavis, was also a teacher and the couple had a son, Sydney, named after his father.

In 1959 Petersen was appointed a member of the US–SA leadership program and travelled with his family to America, where he lectured at several university colleges in New York and Chicago. His hosts noticed he was writing his reports by hand, so the bought him a typewriter, with which he wrote for the rest of his life. He travelled to Ghana, Israel, Greece and Turkey. In April 1960, he spent a year abroad as a guest of the Dutch-South African Society. From 1969 on he was also invited by the governments of Germany and the Netherlands to visit educational centres in these countries. In 1982 he was appointed to the advisory board of the SABC He died of kidney failure in Groote Schuur Hospital, Cape Town on 30 October 1987.

== The Writer ==
Already in primary school he started to write prose in addition to poetry. After 1940, short stories and sketches appeared in Naweek, Suid-Afrika, Die Huisgenoot and Tydskrif vir Letterkunde. His short stories Repos ailleurs and Kaapstad are included in the volume Geseënd is julle (Blessed Are You), edited by S. J. Malan and W.H. Vos. The short story Verbode vrugte (Forbidden Fruit), was published in 1943 in Die Naweek and included by Daniel Hugo in his collection Tydskrif 2. Its theme of racially mixed marriage, dealt with in rather more jovial than confrontational fashion, was daring for the time.

From the same period dates the novel As die Son Ondergaan (When the Sun Goes Down), a story about the demise of a young brown man (Frans) in the city. The gifted young man, unable to realise his ambition to become a teacher, left his home in the countryside for city, hoping to get a paying job. He is swallowed up in the urban industrial machine and makes friends with the wrong crowd of people. His morality undermined by drinking and sex, he marries a flighty young woman, Karolien. Deserted by his so-called friends and his wife, he is given over to drink. Then his parents come for him. By returning to his old, familiar environment he can at last, overcome his spiritual crisis. For the first time in African literature, the race issue is here addressed from the point of view of people of colour, the emotional impact emphasised. This problem, however, remains largely in the background, the destruction and preservation of the protagonist representing not a symbolic example of the coloured people's struggle, but rather a more universally human development. The novel shows a far more nuanced characterization than the stereotyping of so many previous writers.

In 1946 As die Son Ondergaan was awarded the prize in a nationwide contest of prose writing offered by the magazine Kern a part of the Unie-Volkspers. Along with PJ Philander he authored school textbooks for geography and history.

However,his poems contributes to Afrikaans literature. In his work, the brown people, with their varied feelings of resistance and resignation, receive for the first time, their own voice in African literature. His writing style initially draws more on the older poets and their national type of verse, rather than the Dertigers or Viertigers (Afrikaans poets of the thirties and forties) with their more personal issues. Many verses in his early collections are impressive in their simplicity and dramatic impact through the use of dialogue. In tone wry and bitter and filled with deep emotion, presented however, in a naturally sober and direct manner. Yet the technique in these poems still largely stems from the generation before the thirties.

Die Enkeling (The individual) makes its impact more through the authenticity of feeling about the suffering of coloured people, than the quality of the poems, which technically, are not yet truly poetry. It is especially the poignant poem Bede (Prayer) that revolts against "the accursed penalty of a dark skin" and concludes with the speaker praying for the fortitude to accept his fate, should this indeed be God's will. Opstand (Revolt) describes far more how difficult it is to acquiesce and be silent. In Roepende stemme (Calling voices) a chorus cries out, questioning how long the oppression will continue, each commentator responding by placing the calls within a greater reality. Die arbeider (The labourer) is a largely successful portrayal of a human character. A poem like Die vreemde (The stranger) is typifies the protest and resentment caused by the inferior position coloured people hold within society, while the theme of Drinklied (Drinking song) speaks of trying to escape reality through alcohol. In a second edition, he omits a number of his more youthful verses – Worsteling, Vergewe... Vergeet? , Elegie and Die winterwind – but makes no further changes.

Die stil kind (The quiet child) evinces considerable artistic progress, with the tone of the poems less harsh. As its title states, the dreaming child is portrayed as a lonely individual, while verses describe with deep emotion the ravaged victims of poverty. Riversdal shows nine women who wash white people's clothes by the river, with word and rhythm used to great effect. Voorteken (Pre-ordained) outlines the loneliness of the coloured people, knowing that their life is doomed to heavy labour and unfulfilment. Motorrit (Road trip) expresses the sense of release when the narrator in his car leaves the city behind him, free in the speed of the car and the presence of nature, while Rondebosch likewise depicts the freedom of nature. Die loper (The runner) portrays the struggle of the intellectual coloured man, and Slotsom (Conclusion) concludes that, in death, no difference between the races exists.

After a long hiatus, Petersen began publishing again after 1960 with Die kinders van Kain (The Children of Cain), Suiderkruis (Southern Cross), Nag is verby (Night is over) and Laat kom dan die wind (Late the Wind Then Comes). The finest verses in these collections wittily portray city types, while those of resistance against racial discrimination resound far more powerfully.

The title Die kinders van Kain immediately points to those excluded from the rest of society. The collection reflects the progress of his first two books and in depicting the provocation, the melancholy and loneliness of the brown people and can be seen as an important milestone in African poetry. The statement of most of the poems is sober and less desperate, while a larger number a number contain a transcendent purity. Beautiful poems include Kinders van Kain (where the fate of those kicked out is contrasted with the promise of the New Day); Die drumpel (The threshold), in which the harsh manner in which coloured people are treated is challenged by an accusation that, as a racial group, they originated from the immoral behaviour of white pioneers; Kinderland (Childhood), with its melancholy about the utterly lost dreams of childhood; and Die veles (The many) follows the path of common people through life in rather a witty manner. Bergies (Mountain dwellers) is also noteworthy, with its witty imagery of this marginalised sector of society, while Windermere touches the social needs of the people. Kaapse naweek describes the superficial lifestyle of revellers. Die toring Babel (The Tower of Babel) makes of discrimination not simply a local but a universal issue, while Kamee (Cameo) portrays the cheerfulness of the brown woman in the midst of her suffering.

Suiderkruis, in two sections, contains poems about of the memories of a youth in the rural areas. on the one hand and events within the contemporary urban environment on the other. Each section ends with a suite of five poems, Ballade – a series about the "platteland", the countryside, and one on the "Confession of the city dweller" showing the contrasts in the feeling of freedom. Memories of country life find expression in poignant poetic memoirs such as Tuiskoms (Homecoming) and Sekelgat, where former joys are played off against the sadness of remembrance. Well portrayed are also the marginalised of the city, Koerante-verkopertjie (News vendor) and Die doofstomme (The deaf-mute).

Alleenstryd ("Single combat" or "the lonely struggle") is a label he himself finds appropriate for poetry up to that point. It fits the loneliness and the life struggles to which his poems give voice, characterised in the progression from rural nature verses to the more realistically-oriented poems of city life.

Nag is verby, dedicated to I.D. du Plessis deals with how the question of skin colour can dominate one's judgements on the value and dignity of the human being, and the search for one's own identity in trying to find the sense of security that was present in the parental home. . The collection includes poems of resistance, landscape poetry, poems of remembrance and travel, the latter inspired by journeys both at home and abroad. The title reflects a optimistic outlook, a move away from a situation of frustration to one of greater hope and equality, which is also reflected in the content of the poems. The title poem develops a prophetic vision of human freedom. Noteworthy poems are Stadsmens (City dweller), depicting the hand-to-mouth existence of this group; Kaapse Vlak (Cape Flats) about the violent death of a young boy; and Landelik (Rural), beautiful images from this carefree and simple world. There are also several memory verses, the best of them, Drie dromertjies (Three little drummers), Die witborskraai (The pied crow) and Sekelmaan (The sickle moon).

His last collection Laat kom dan die wind, received generally negative criticism. It includes poems of travel, childhood memories, longings for a bygone way of life and images of city personages.

In 1962 he published in the Netherlands a collection of English verses or aphorisms, Meditations on the brink: dedicated with reverence to the life-work of Willem Zeylmans van Emmichoven, based largely on the anthroposophical theories of Rudolf Steiner. It is his only such publication in English, speaks of his meeting with Willem Zeylmans van Emmichoven and describes insights he gained through him. This he re-published under his own name in South Africa in 1980.

In 1967, Dr. W.H. Vos compiled a volume, Keurverse (Selected poems) from the poetry of Petersen and PJ Philander. His poems are included in several anthologies, including Groot verseboek, Die Afrikaanse poësie in 'n duisend en enkele gedigte, Digterstemme, Afrikaanse verse, Uit ons digkuns, Uit ons letterkunde, Digters en digkuns, Die junior digbundel, Woordpaljas, My Afrikaanse verseboek, Die goue vreugde, Voorspraak en Junior verseboek, also providing a poem for the collection Verse vir Opperman. He also published poems in magazines such as Standpunte en Tydskrif vir Letterkunde.

== Tributes ==
In 1950 the SABC dedicated an episode of Ons skrywers en digters aan die woord (Our writers and poets of the word) to his work. The South African Academy for Science and Art in 1959 awarded him a medal of honour for his contribution to Afrikaans culture and he received the Crown Medal for his educational work. In 1977, he was proposed for membership of the South African Academy for Science and Art, but the Academy took so long to come to a decision that seven members resigned in protest. When the Academy finally approached him to become a member, he turned this down due to ill health. In 1982 the State President awarded him the Decoration for Meritorious Service and in 1986 he was elected a member of the Society of Dutch Literature in Leiden in the Netherlands. Shortly after his death, he was declared honorary citizen of his native village Riversdale, together with Alba Bouwer and Dalene Matthee. A radio play about him was compiled by Chris Swanepoel under the title Kind van die dal (Child of the valley) and broadcast on the South African Broadcasting Corporation's Afrikaans Service in 1989. The composer Hendrik Hofmeyr set to music two of his poems in 1997, Kinderland and Die veles from the volume Die kinders van Kain and in 2005 further songs set to music by Hofmeyr were sung at the "Woordfees "(Festival of the Word) in Stellenbosch.

== Works by SV Petersen ==
Poetry

- 1944 – Die Enkeling Unie-Volkspers Bpk Port Elizabeth, Cape Town
- 1948 – Die stil kind Maskew Miller Cape Town
- 1960 – Die kinders van Kain Nasionale Boekhandel Bpk Cape Town, Bloemfontein, Johannesburg
- 1965 – Suiderkruis Nasionale Boekhandel Bpk Cape Town
- 1979 – AlleenstrydTafelberg Kaapstad
- 1980 – Nag is verby Tafelberg Cape Town
- 1985 – Laat kom dan die wind Perskor Cape Town, Johannesburg

Other works

- 1945 – As die son ondergaan Unie-Volkspers Bpk Port Elizabeth, Cape Town
- 1946? – Lewensbesonderhede (manuscript) Bloemfontein: NALN
- 1956? Afrikaans – Language of my emotions S.A. Panorama, [?]
- 1962 – Meditations on the brink – Dedicated with reverence to the life and work of Willem Zeylmans van Emmichoven. With 12 illustrations by Adelbert Zeylmans, Zeist 1962
- 1980 Meditations on the brink Own publication Rondebosch

== Books about or containing works by SV Petersen ==
- Antonissen, Rob "Die Afrikaanse letterkunde van aanvang tot hede" Nasou Beperk Elsiesrivier Derde hersiene uitgawe Tweede druk 1964
- Antonissen, Rob "Kern en tooi" Nasou Beperk Eerste uitgawe Eerste druk Elsiesrivier 1963
- APB-Komitee vir Skoolboeke "Die junior digbundel" Afrikaanse Pers-Boekhandel Johannesburg Sesde druk 1963
- Askes, H. en Landman, J.N. (samestellers) "Voorspraak" Tafelberg-Uitgewers Beperk Kaapstad Eerste uitgawe Tiende druk 1994
- Beukes, Gerhard J. en Lategan, F.V. "Skrywers en rigtings" J.L. van Schaik Bpk. Pretoria Eerste uitgawe 1952
- Botha, Danie "Die helder dae" Tafelberg-Uitgewers Beperk Kaapstad Eerste uitgawe 2014
- Buning, Tj. "Uit ons digkuns" J.L. van Schaik Bpk. Pretoria Nuwe omgewerkte druk 1960
- Dekker, G. "Afrikaanse Literatuurgeskiedenis" Nasou Beperk Kaapstad Elfde druk 1970
- Grové, A.P. "Letterkundige sakwoordeboek vir Afrikaans" Nasou Beperk Vyfde uitgawe Eerste druk 1988
- Kannemeyer, J.C. "Geskiedenis van die Afrikaanse literatuur 1" Academica, Pretoria en Kaapstad Tweede druk 1984
- Kannemeyer, J.C. "Geskiedenis van die Afrikaanse literatuur 2" Academica, Pretoria, Kaapstad en Johannesburg Eerste uitgawe Eerste druk 1983
- Kannemeyer, J.C. "Verse vir die vraestel" Tafelberg-Uitgewers Beperk Eerste uitgawe 1998
- Kannemeyer, J.C. "Die Afrikaanse literatuur 1652–2004" Human & Rousseau Kaapstad en Pretoria Eerste uitgawe 2005
- Lindenberg, E. (red.) "Inleiding tot die Afrikaanse letterkunde" Academica Pretoria en Kaapstad Vierde uitgawe Eerste druk 1973
- Nienaber, C.J.M. "Oor literatuur 2" Academica Pretoria en Kaapstad Eerste uitgawe 1977
- Nienaber, P.J., Roodt, P.H. en Snyman, N.J. (samestellers) "Digters en digkuns" Perskor-Uitgewers Kaapstad Vyfde uitgawe Sewende druk 2007
- Nienaber, P.J. "Hier is ons skrywers!" Afrikaanse Pers-Boekhandel Johannesburg Eerste uitgawe 1949
- Nienaber, P.J.; Senekal, J.H en Bothma, T.C. "Mylpale in die geskiedenis van die Afrikaanse letterkunde" Afrikaanse Pers-Boekhandel Tweede hersiene uitgawe 1963
- Nienaber, P.J. et al. "Perspektief en Profiel" Afrikaanse Pers-Boekhandel Johannesburg Derde hersiene uitgawe 1969
- Nienaber, P.J.; Erasmus, M.C.; Du Plessis, W.K. en Du Plooy, J.L. "Uit ons letterkunde" Afrikaanse Pers-Boekhandel Sewende druk 1968
- Opperman, D.J. "Junior verseboek" Nasionale Boekhandel Beperk Kaapstad Agste druk 1960
- Pheiffer, R.H. "Woordpaljas" Human & Rousseau Kaapstad en Johannesburg Derde uitgawe Derde druk 1993
- Van Coller, H.P. (red.) "Perspektief en Profiel Deel I" J.L. van Schaik-Uitgewers Pretoria Eerste uitgawe 1998
- Van Coller, H.P. (red.) "Perspektief en Profiel Deel 2" J.L. van Schaik-Uitgewers Pretoria Eerste uitgawe 1999
- Willemse, Hein "Aan die ander kant" Protea Boekhuis Pretoria Eerste uitgawe Eerste druk 2007

Newspapers and Periodicals

- Anoniem "S.V. Petersen op 73 in Kaapstad oorlede" "Die Burger" 31 Oktober 1987
- Ester, Hans "Sydney Vernon Petersen" "Jaarboek van de Maatschappij der Nederlandse Letterkunde te Leiden, 1999–2000"
- Jansen, Valda "Op soek na S.V. Petersen" "Rapport" 5 December 2010
- Toerien, Barend J. "Dwars moet ek wees om reguit te wees" "Die Burger" 4 November 1987
- Watermeyer, G.A. "Die digterskap van S.V. Petersen" "Helikon" Jaargang 3 no. 13 Oktober 1953

Internet

- Die Burger: http://152.111.1.87/argief/berigte/dieburger/1987/10/31/3/2.html
- Die Burger: http://152.111.1.87/argief/berigte/dieburger/1987/11/03/15/11.html
- Die Burger: http://152.111.1.87/argief/berigte/dieburger/1987/12/10/16/3.html
- Digitale Bibliotheek voor Nederlandse letteren: http://www.dbnl.org/auteurs/auteur.php?id=pete028
- Esaach: http://www.esaach.org.za/index.php?title=Petersen,_Sydney_Vernon
- LitNet ATKV-Skrywersalbum 15. December 2008: www.litnet.co.za
- Van Wyk, Steward LitNet: http://www.litnet.co.za/sv-petersen-se-tydskrifverhale/
- Willemse, Hein Archived public website: http://archivedpublicwebsite.up.ac.za/sitefiles/file/46/349/Verwantskap%20SV%20Petersen%20-%20Hein%20Willemse.pdf
- Willemse, Hein (January 2010). "S. V. Petersen in dialogue with his intellectual and social environment". Tydskrif vir Letterkunde. 47 (2).
- Worldcat: http://www.worldcat.org/identities/lccn-no2002095267/
