= Dirk van Lokhorst =

Dutch painter (1818–1893)

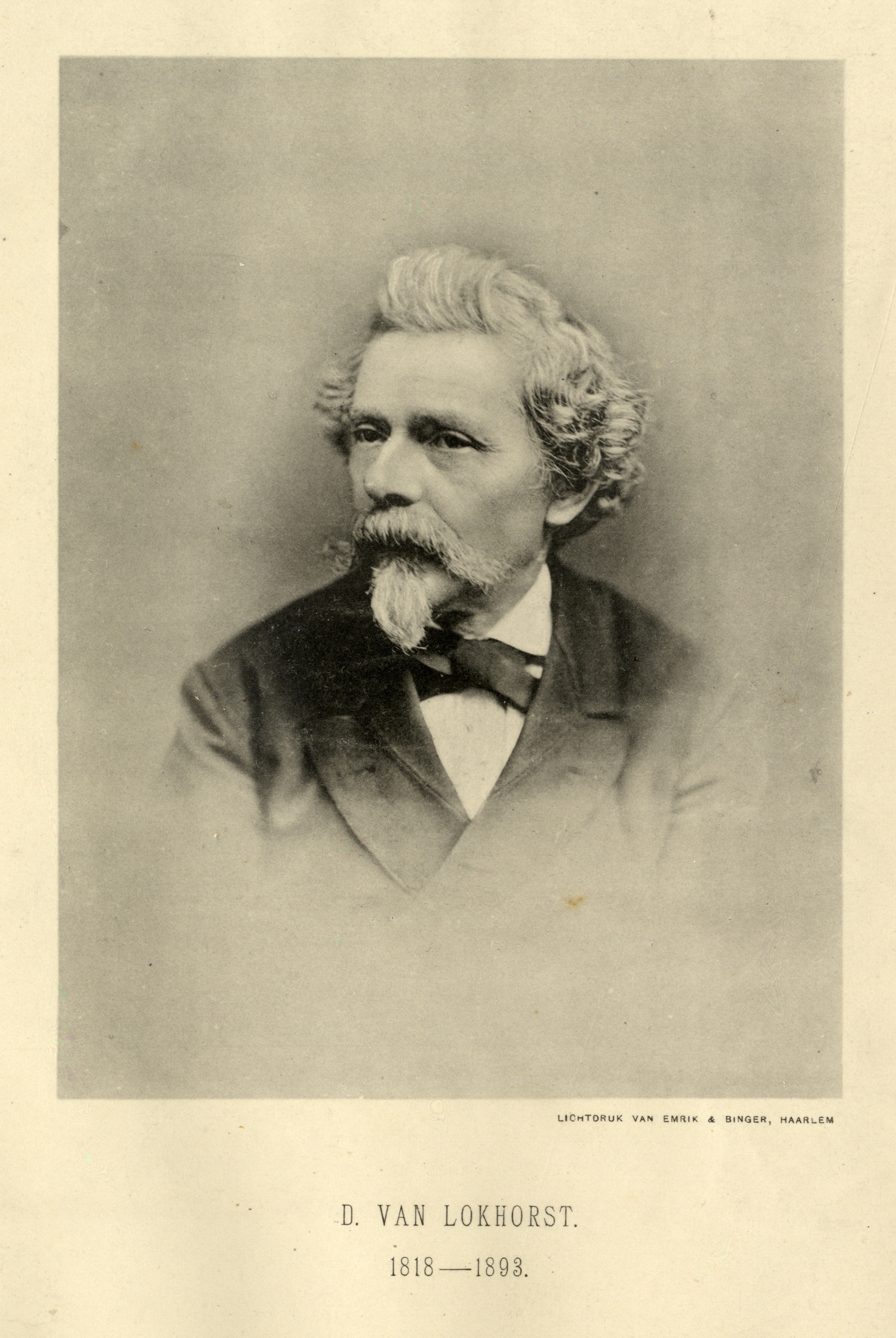
Portrait of van Lokhorst (1870s)

Dirk van Lokhorst (11 November 1818 – 9 July 1893) was a Dutch painter. He was born, lived and worked in Utrecht throughout his life, specialising in landscapes and paintings of animals. He studied under the cattle painter Albertus Verhoesen and Johannes Bilders. Among his own pupils were his son Dirk Pieter van Lokhorst and the marine painter Jacob Eduard van Heemskerck van Beest.

Although he was best known as a painter, van Lokhorst was also a portrait photographer. He established a lithographic factory in Utrecht, adding a photographic facility in 1860. He produced photo portraits and was probably one of the first to make photo lithographs in the Netherlands.
