= Jacoba van Heemskerck =

Dutch painter (1876–1923)

Jonkvrouw Jacoba van Heemskerck
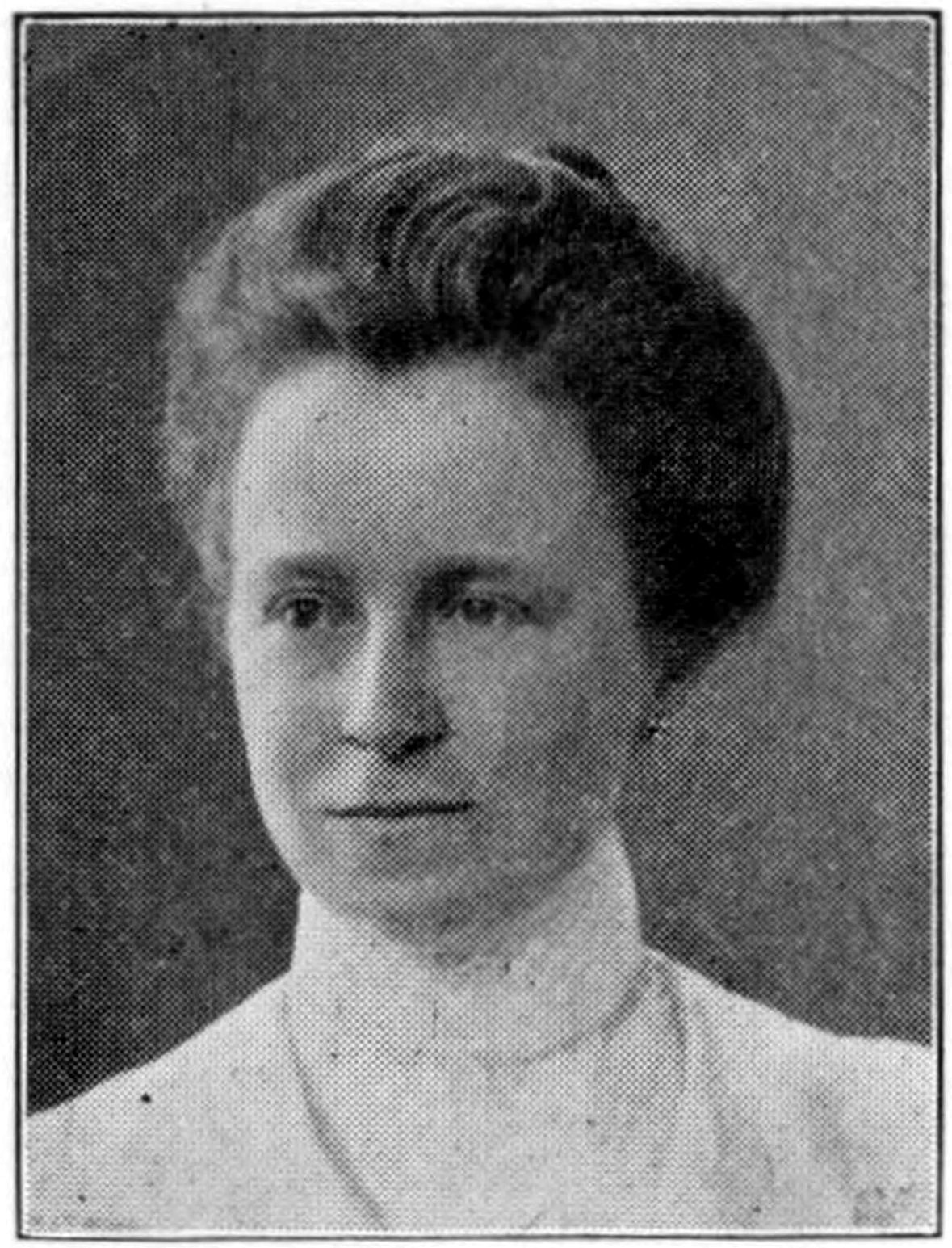
- Born: 1 April 1876; The Hague, Netherlands
- Died: 2 August 1923 (aged 47) (Note: The Gallery Guide for the Royal Academy of Arts exhibition Making Modernism gives her birth and death dates as 4 January 1876 – 3 August 1923.); Domburg, Netherlands.
- Education: Royal Academy of Art

Jkvr. Jacoba Berendina van Heemskerck van Beest (1876–1923) was a Dutch painter, stained glass designer and graphic artist who worked in several modern genres. She specialized in abstract landscapes and still-lifes.

== Biography ==
Her father, Jacob Eduard van Heemskerck van Beest, was an officer in the Royal Netherlands Navy who also painted seascapes and landscapes. Her first art lessons came from him. She later took private lessons from two local artists before attending classes at the Royal Academy of Art from 1897 to 1901, where she studied with Ferdinand Hart Nibbrig.

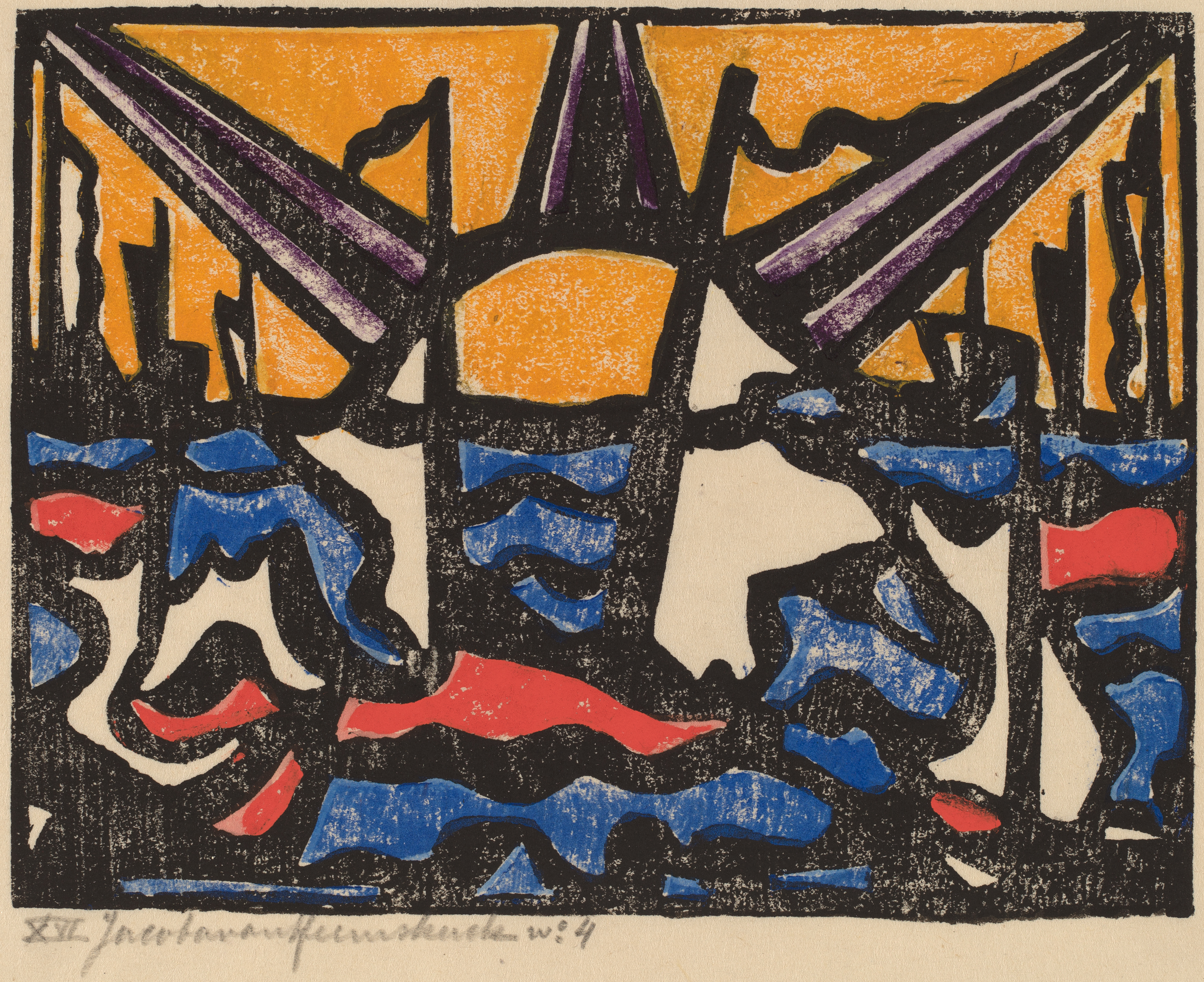
Landscape with a Sun, c. 1915, National Gallery of Art

Her first contact with modern art came in Paris, where she took lessons from Eugène Carrière. She remained in France until 1904, then went to live with her sister, Lucie, and was introduced to the art collector, Marie Tak van Poortvliet, who became her lifelong friend and later built a studio for her in the garden of her home. After 1906, she spent her Summers in Domburg, where she came into contact with avant-garde painters such as Piet Mondriaan and Jan Toorop, who offered her advice. Around 1911, she was briefly interested in Cubism.

Shortly after, she became involved in Anthroposophy, possibly through the influence of her former teacher, Nibbrig, who was a Theosophist. She then became an avid follower of Der Sturm, an avant-garde art magazine founded by Herwarth Walden, and turned increasingly to Abstraction. In 1913, she attended the Erster Deutscher Herbstsalon in Berlin, where she met Walden and started what would be a lifelong correspondence. Thanks to his efforts, her work was popular in Germany, while it remained somewhat ignored in her home country.

After 1916, she developed an interest in stained glass windows, designing them for the naval barracks and the Municipal Health Department building in Amsterdam, as well as private residences. From 1922, she lived in Domburg with her old friend and patron, Tak van Poortvliet.

She died suddenly, from an attack of angina. Both Tak van Poortvliet and Walden mounted exhibitions of her work, in Amsterdam and Berlin respectively. In 2005, a major retrospective was held at the Gemeentemuseum Den Haag.

== Selected works ==
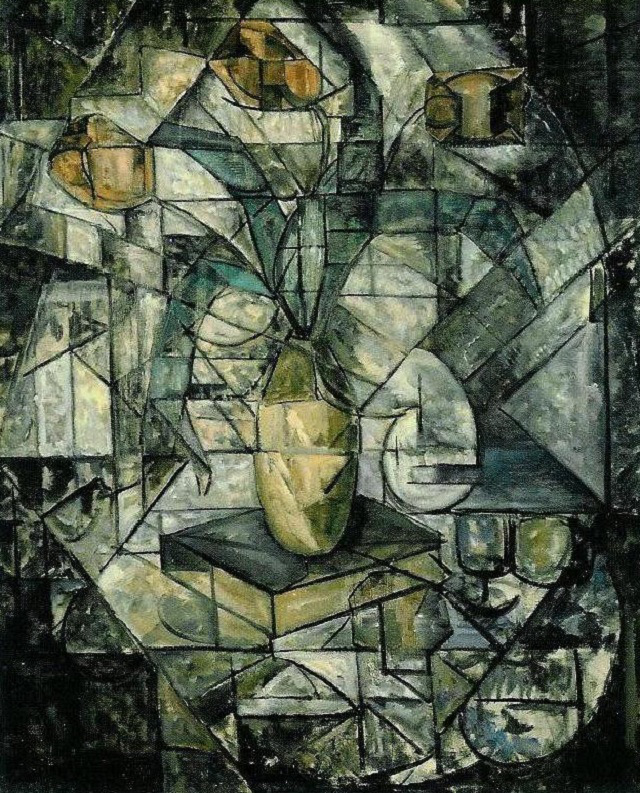
18 Composite Opus 1

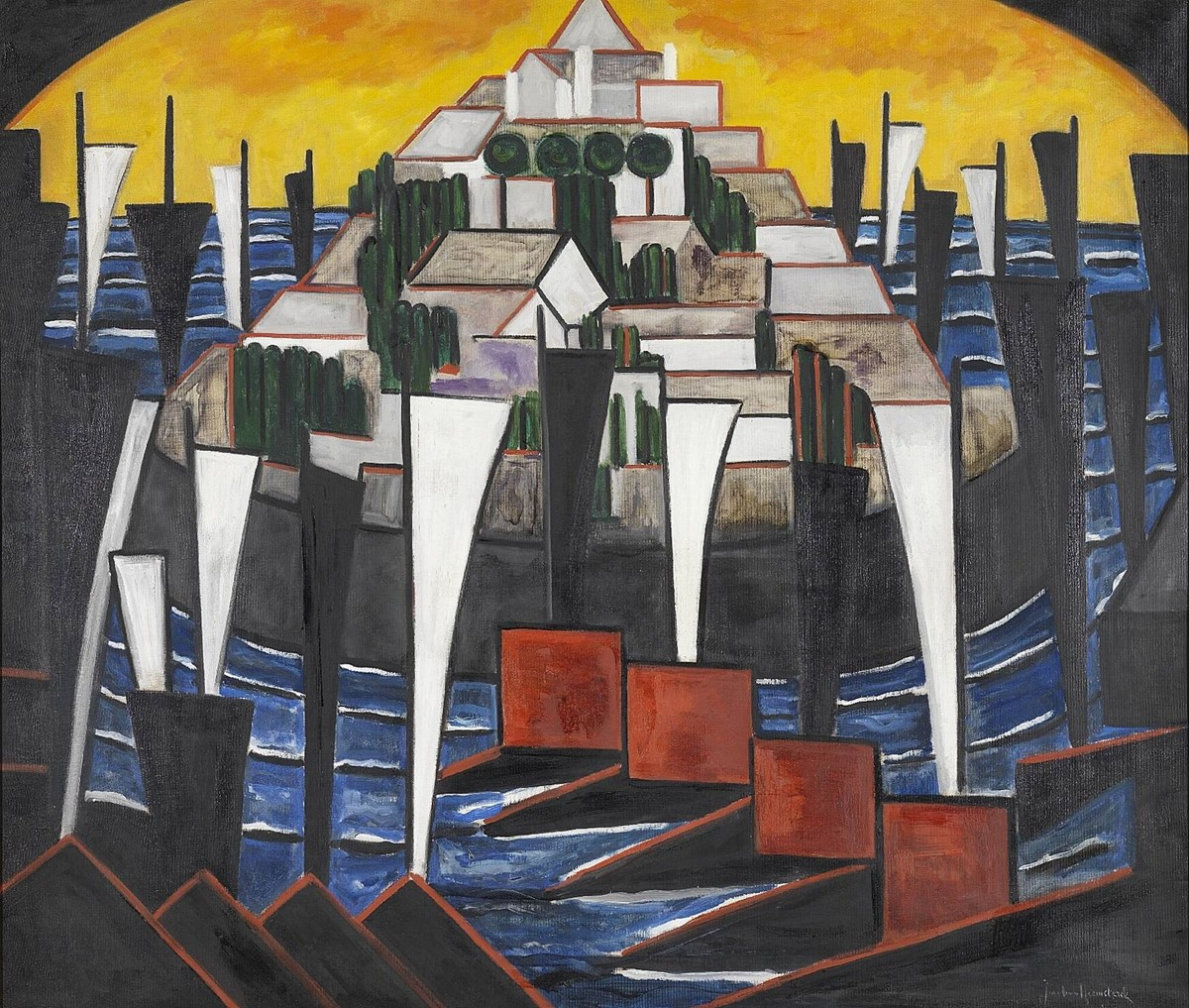
Sailboats

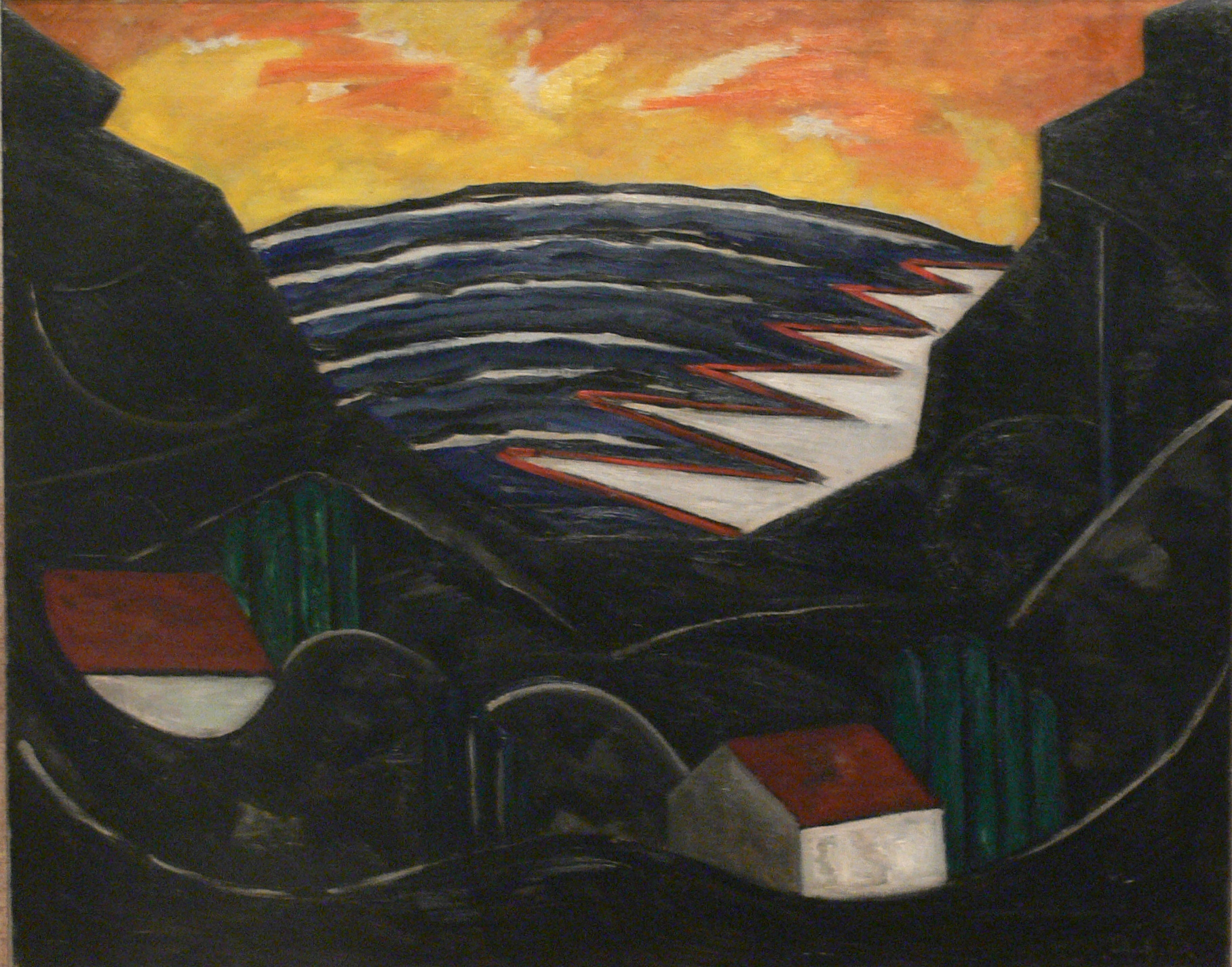
Landscape Image I

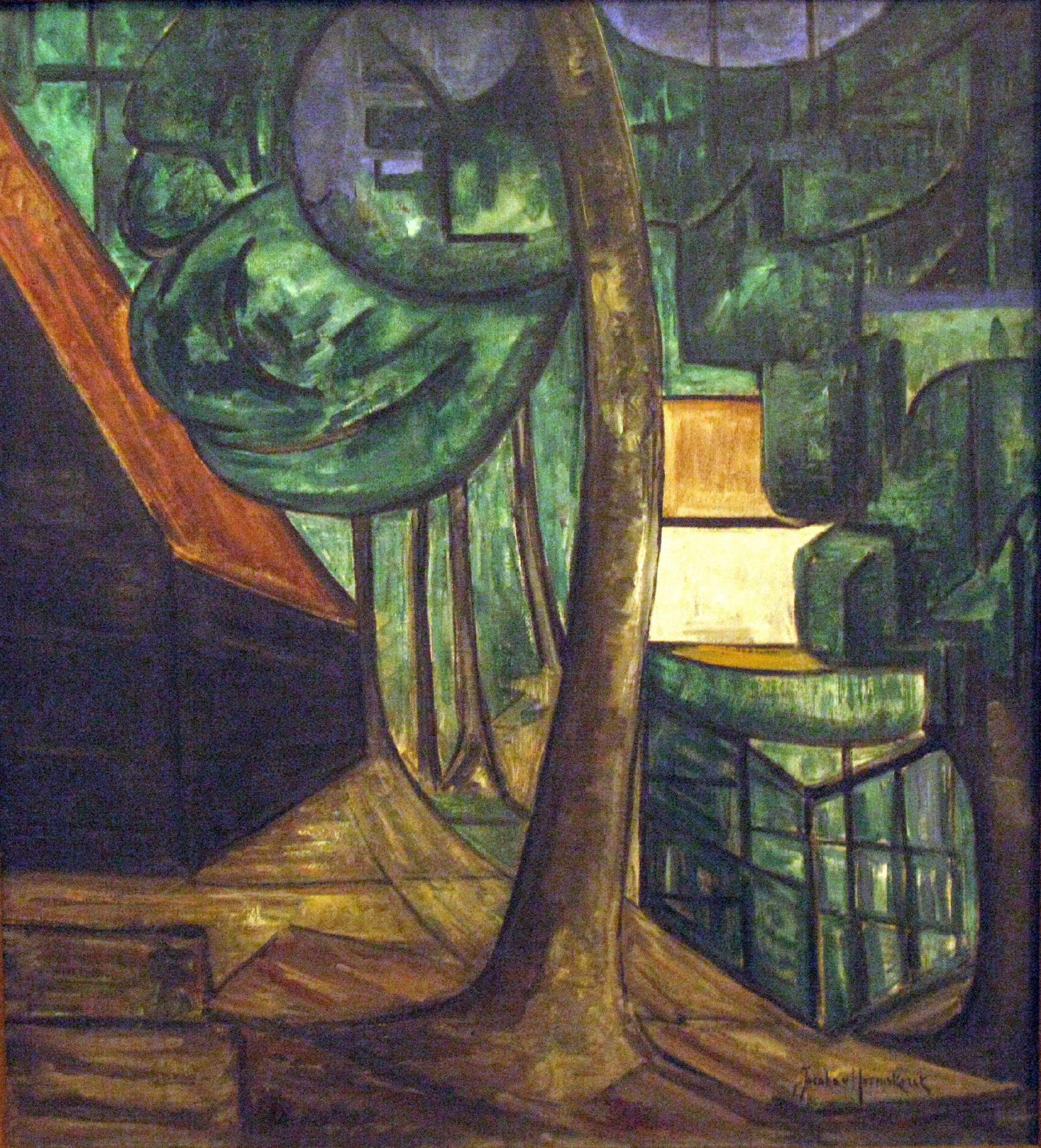
Landscape

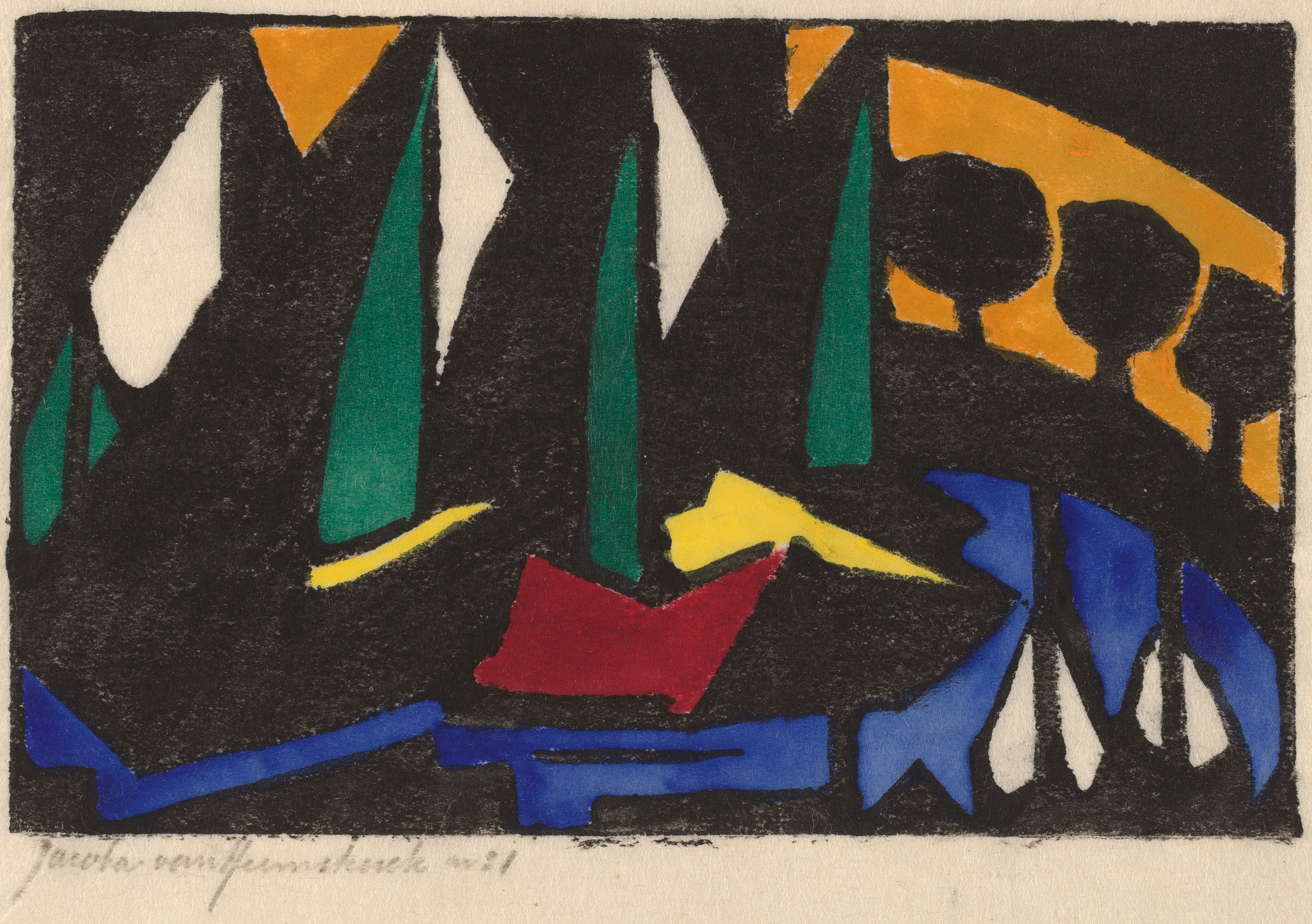
Jacoba van Heemskerck van Beest, Boat and Trees, 1914, woodcut in black, hand colored with watercolor, on Japan paper, Image:9.6 x 15.1 cm (3 3/4 x 5 15/16 in.) sheet: 18.4 x 24 cm (7 1/4 x 9 7/16 in.), Gift of Ruth Cole Kainen, 2012.92.270, National Gallery of Art

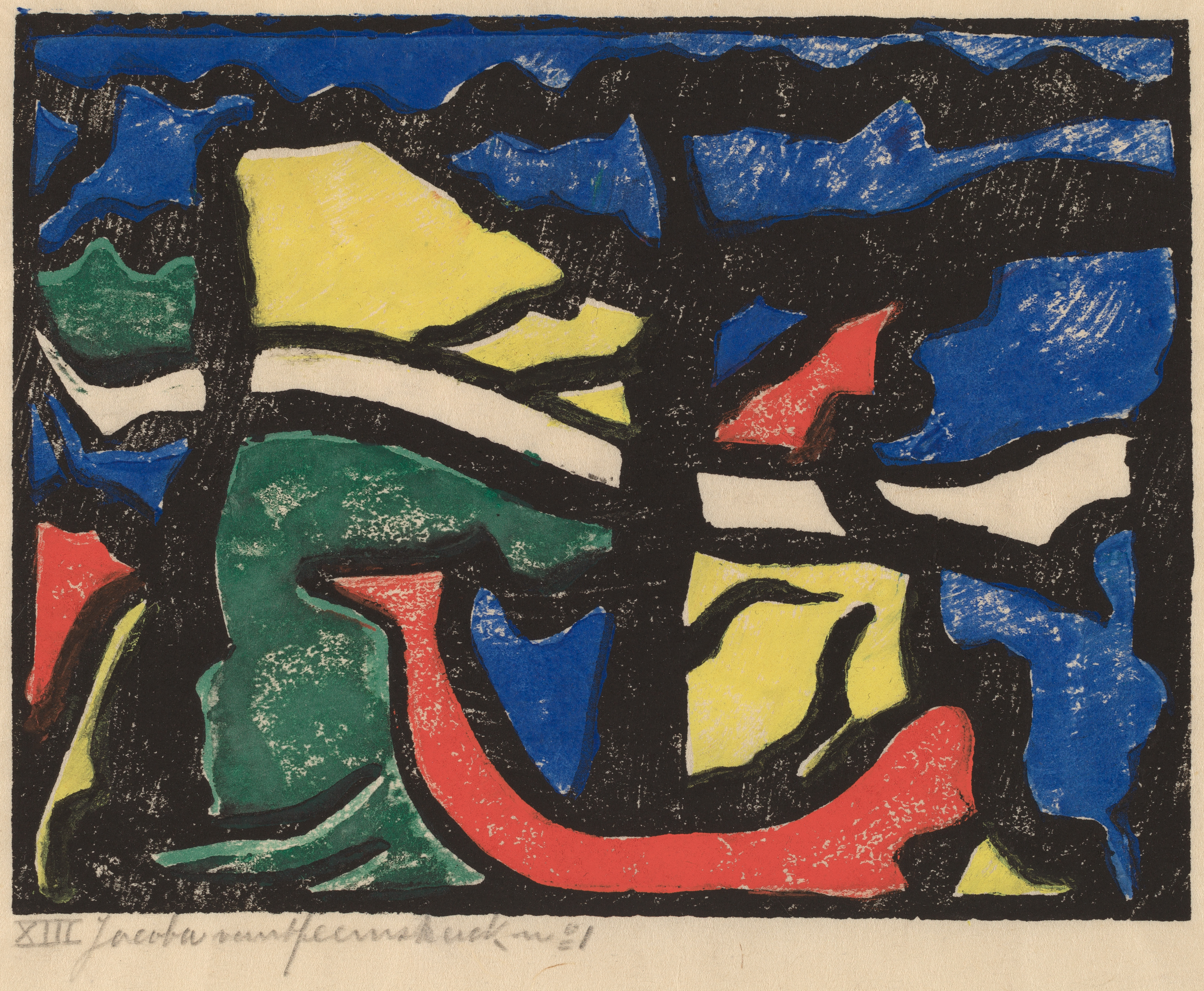
Jacoba van Heemskerck van Beest, Composition, 1914–1915, NGA 153658 National Gallery of Art

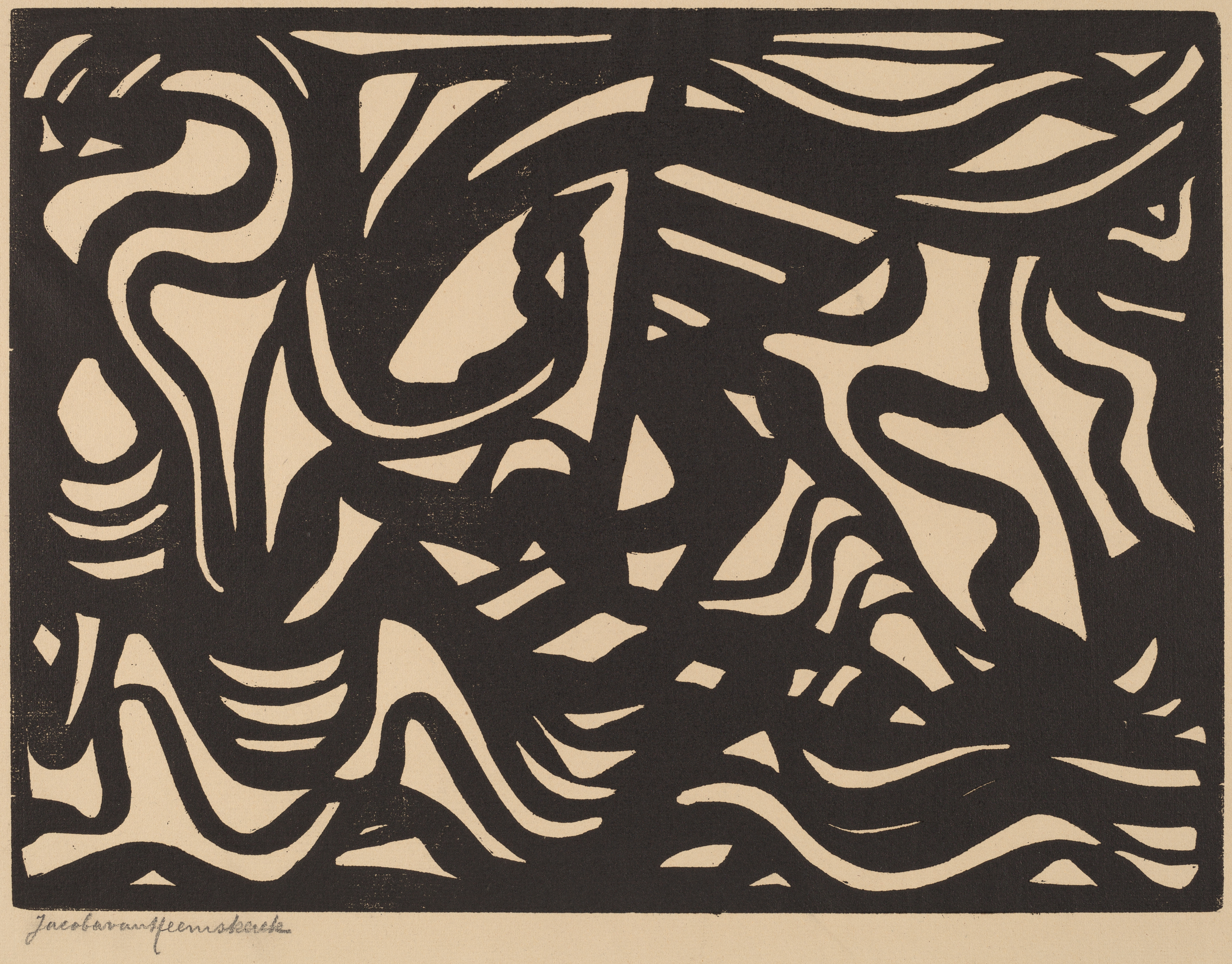
Jacoba van Heemskerck van Beest, Composition, 1921, NGA 153660 National Gallery of Art

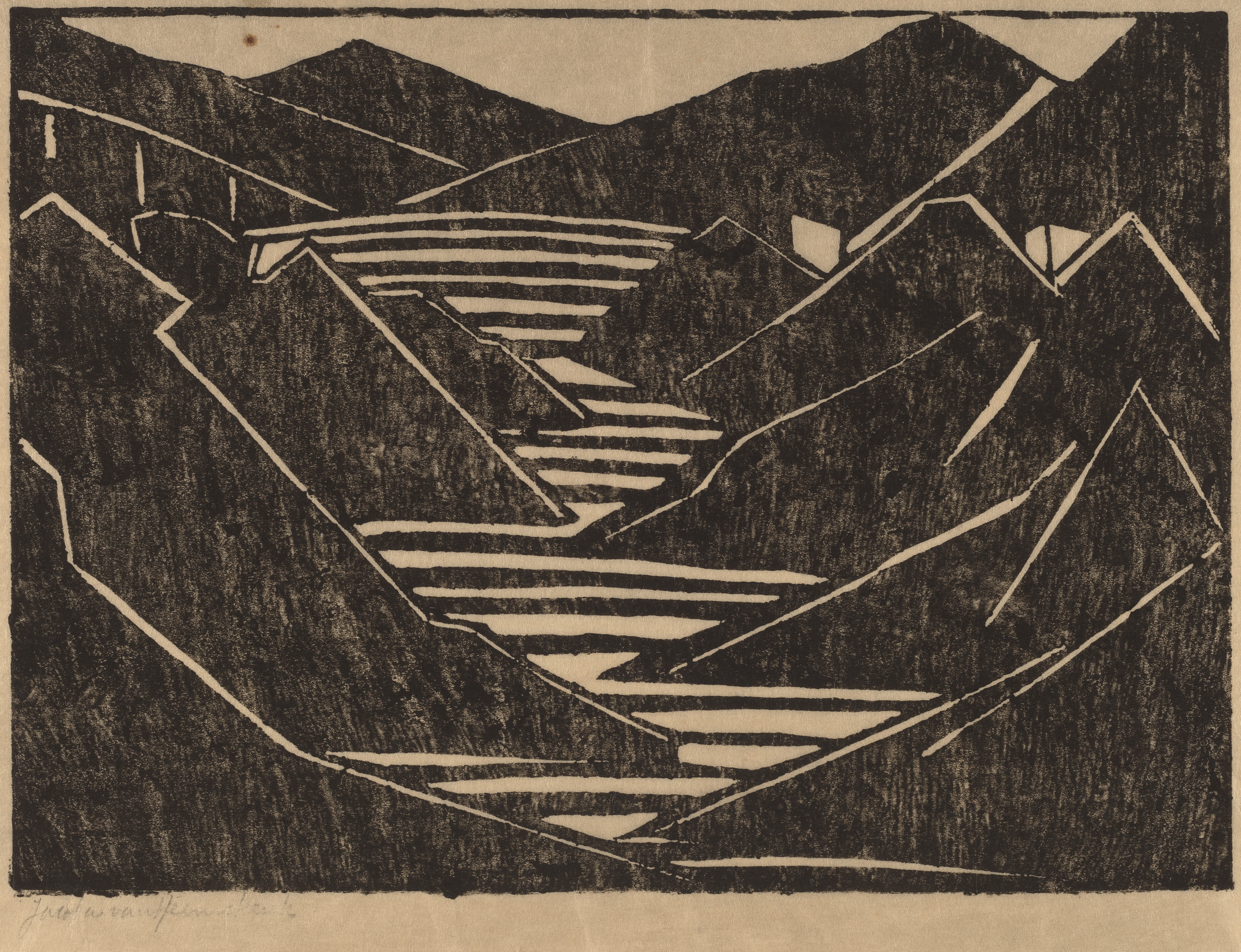
Jacoba van Heemskerck van Beest, Fjord, 1916, NGA 117814 National Gallery of Art

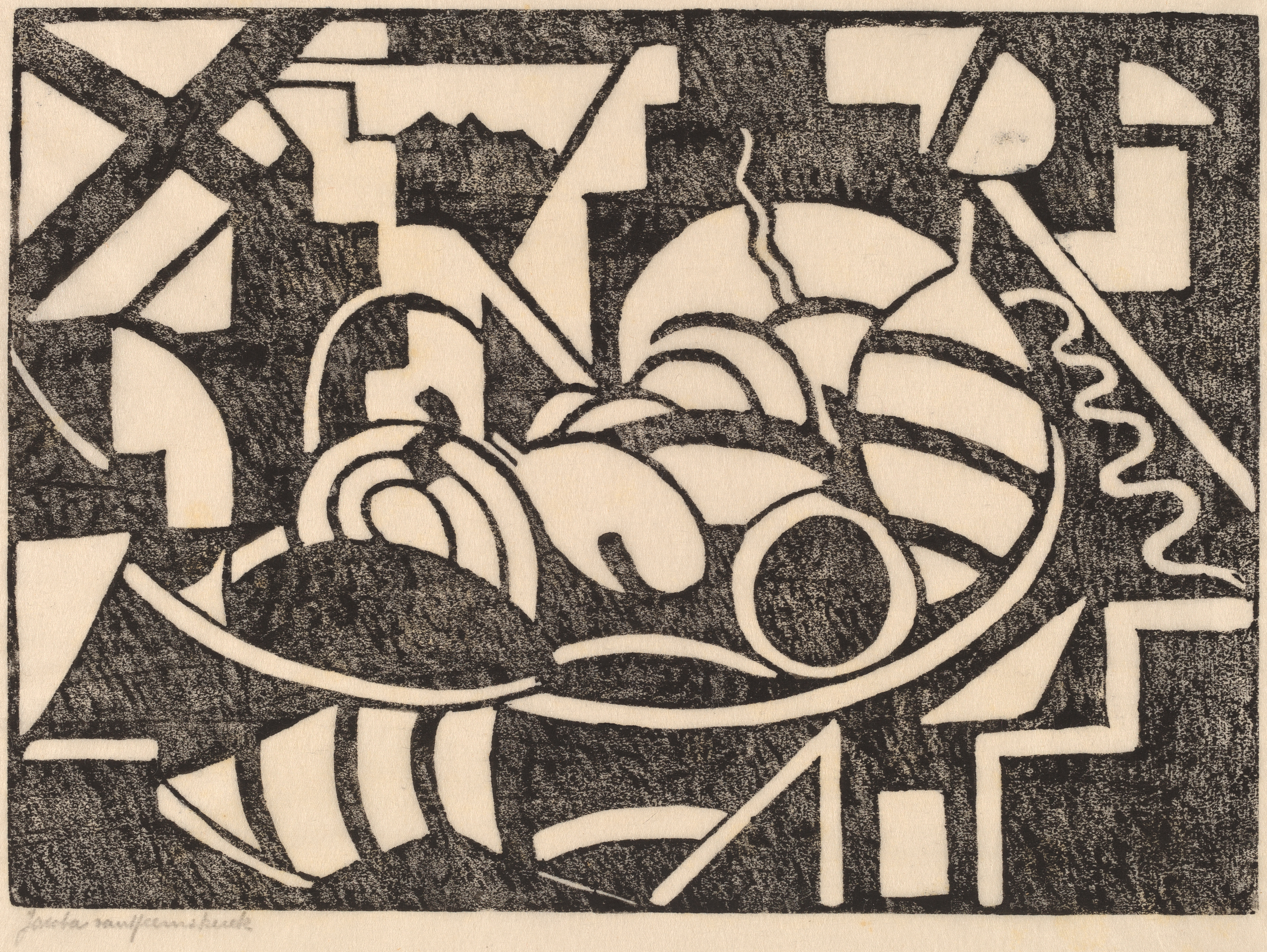
Jacoba van Heemskerck van Beest, Still Life, 1916, NGA 153659 National Gallery of Art

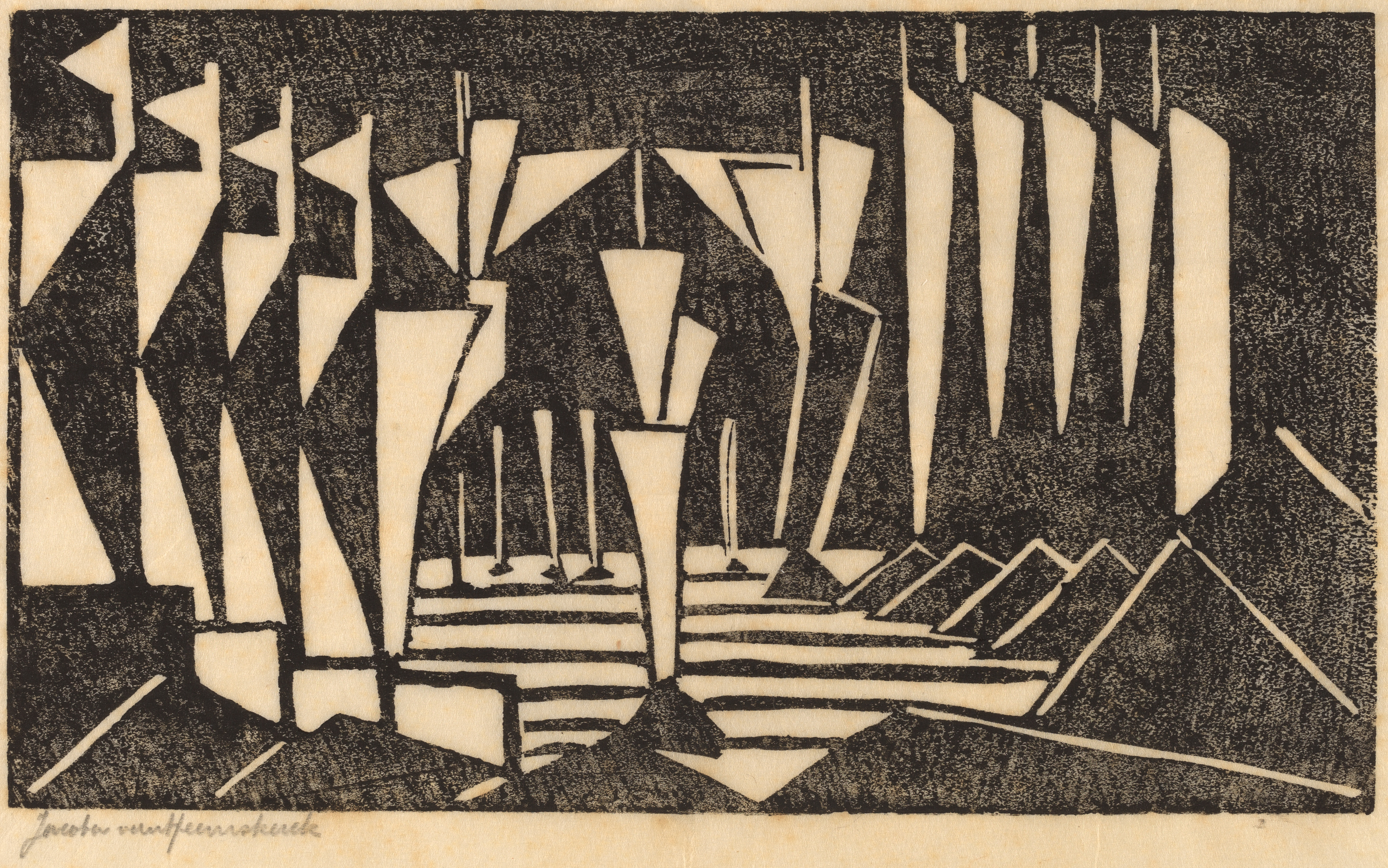
Jacoba van Heemskerck van Beest, Stylized Sailboats, 1915, NGA 153663 National Gallery of Art

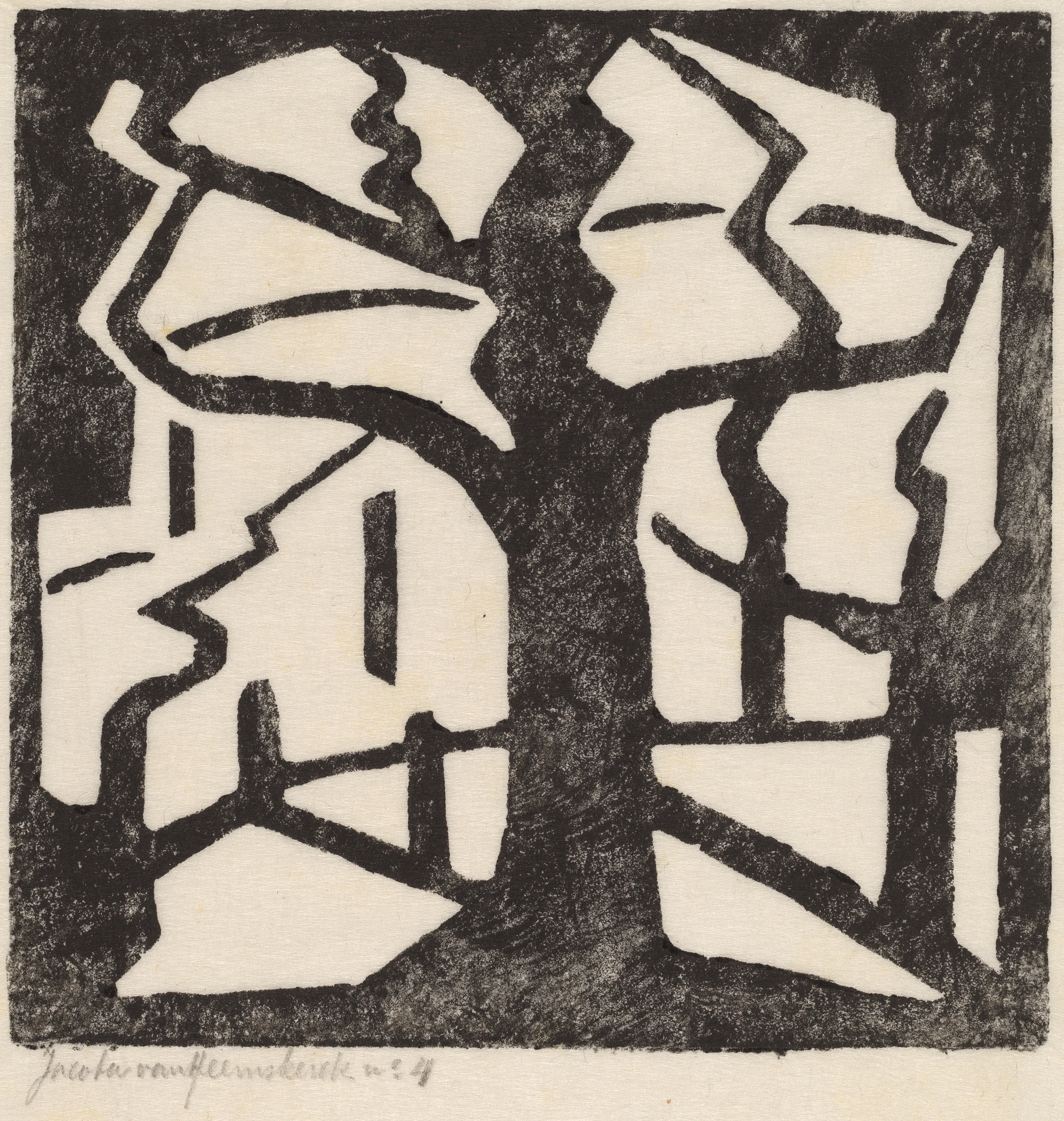
Jacoba van Heemskerck van Beest, Tree, c. 1915, NGA 153657 National Gallery of Art
