= Ruth Cole Kainen =

Art collector and benefactor

Ruth Cole Kainen (February 19, 1922 – September 13, 2009) was a major art collector and benefactor (with her husband, the artist Jacob Kainen [1909–2001]). The Kainens collected paintings, drawings, engravings and prints, dating from the 15th century to modern times. While the National Gallery of Art was the major recipient of their generosity, they also donated many works to the Phillips Collection, the Corcoran Gallery of Art, the Smithsonian American Art Museum, the National Museum of Women in the Arts, and the Baltimore Museum of Art.

Born in Rosboro, Arkansas, Kainen grew up in Oregon, where her family owned and operated the Rosboro Timber and Lumber company. After earning a bachelor's degree in English from the University of Oregon in 1942, she joined the U.S. Navy WAVES and served during World War II. In 1950, she studied music and received a second bachelor's degree at Yale University.
