= Marie Tak van Poortvliet =

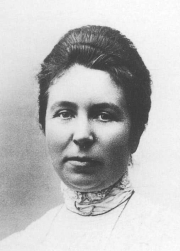
Marie Tak van Poortvliet (date unknown)

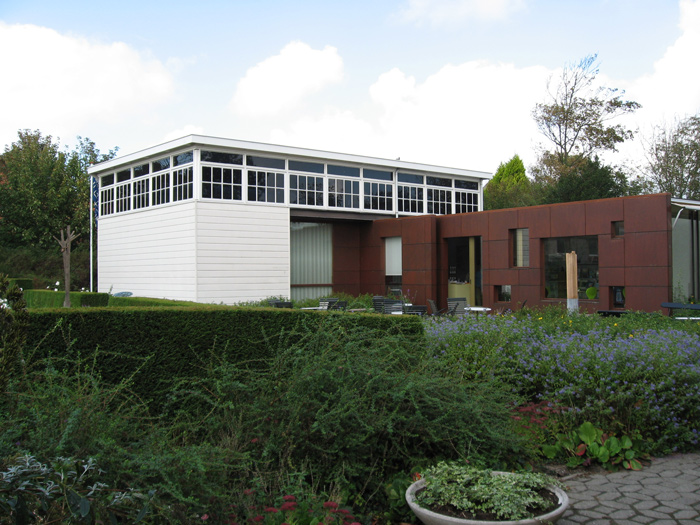
The Marie Tak van Poortvliet Museum

Joanna Maria Tak van Poortvliet (15 February 1871, The Hague – 8 July 1936, Dornach) was a Dutch collector and patron of modern art and art critic. She is the namesake for the Marie Tak van Poortvliet Museum in Domburg.

== Biography ==
She was born to Christina Louisa Henrietta Geertruida van Oordt (1850–1897) and Johannes Tak van Poortvliet, a Dutch politician who served as the Dutch Minister of the Interior from 1891 to 1894.

Tak van Poortvliet attended the High School for Girls in The Hague. She became wealthy after her father's death in 1904, which left 1,500,000 Florins, equivalent to roughly €18 million ($20 million) in 2013, to be distributed among his four children.

Tak van Poortvliet did not marry. After 1906, she spent the summers in Domburg with her life partner, Jacoba van Heemskerck, for whom she set up a studio and acted as a patron. Soon, she began acting as a patron for several other artists; often by purchasing their works. By 1920, she had accumulated over 120 pieces. Later, she sold some to various Dutch museums; leaving a legacy to the Gemeentemuseum Den Haag, the Museum Boijmans Van Beuningen and the Stedelijk Museum.

Tak van Poortvliet and Van Heemskerck were both supporters of the Antroposophy movement of Rudolf Steiner and she translated several of his works into Dutch. With her and Steiner's help, Dr. Willem Zeylmans van Emmichoven was able to establish the Netherlands branch of the Anthroposophical Society in 1923. Three years later she helped to create "N.V. Cultuur Mij Loverendale", which promotes agriculture and animal husbandry in the Biodynamic manner.

She also contributed articles about Anthroposophy, music and art to various journals.

She died in Dornach; Steiner's home town. The Marie Tak van Poortvliet Museum in Domburg is named after her.

== Sources ==
- Nederland's Patriciaat 44 (1958), p. 303.
- A.H. Huussen jr., 'Tak van Poortvliet, Joanna Maria (Marie) (1871-1936)', in: Biografisch Woordenboek van Nederland 2 (1985)
