= Alexander Mollinger =

Dutch painter (1836–1867)

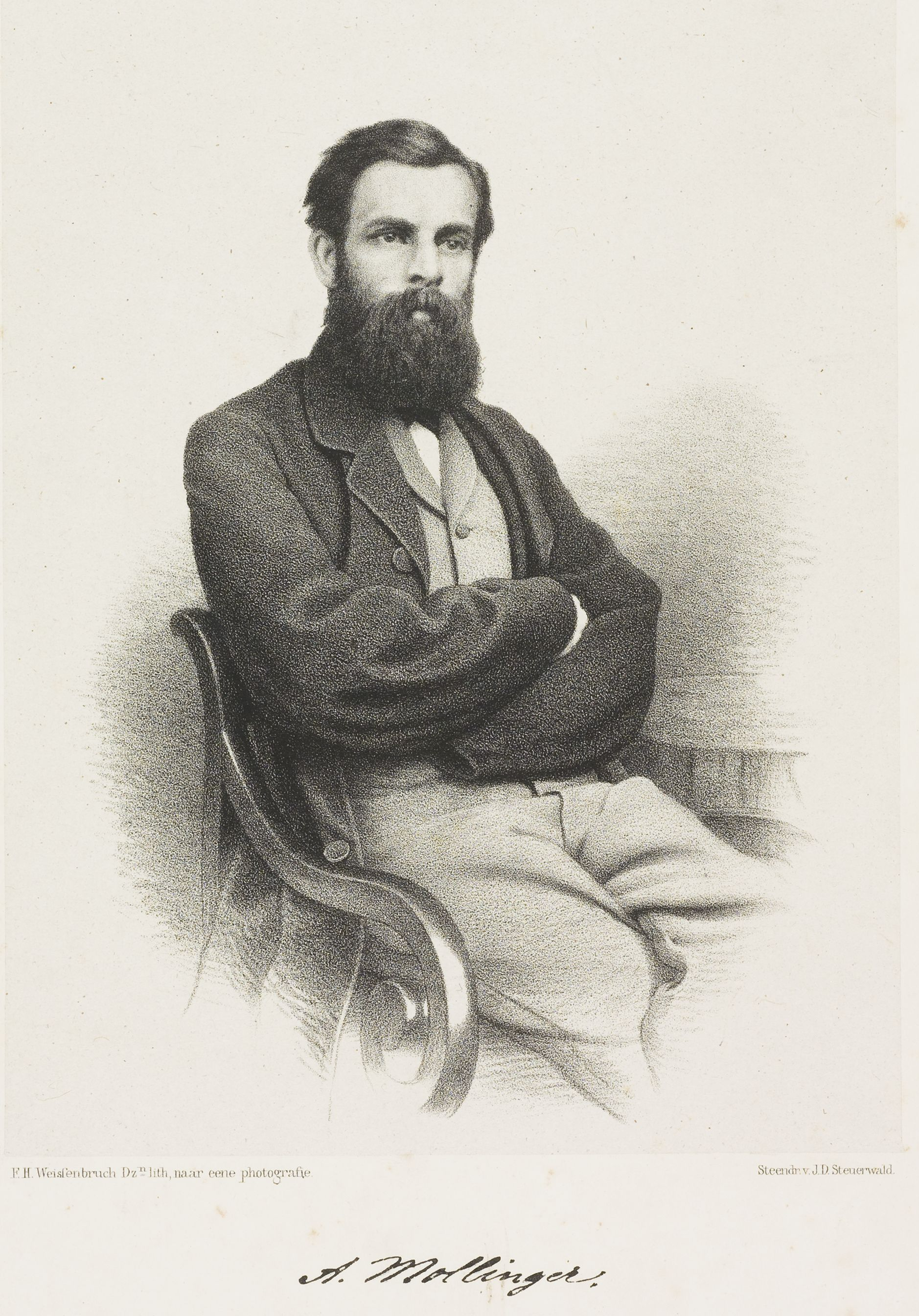
Alexander Mollinger (c.1860); portrait by Frederik Hendrik Weissenbruch (1828-1887)

Godard Alexander Gerrit Philip Mollinger (8 March 1836, Utrecht - 14 September 1867, Utrecht) was a Dutch landscape and genre painter. Although he signed his paintings "A. Mollinger", some sources refer to him as Gerrit Mollinger.

== Biography ==
His father was an infantry officer. He began his studies at the municipal art school and was apprenticed to Willem Benedictus Stoof (1816-1900), a local genre artist. Later, he worked with his brother Louis (1825-1860), who had already established himself as a portrait painter. For two years, beginning in 1856, he took lessons from Willem Roelofs in Brussels. In 1860, he became a member of Arti et Amicitiae.

He eventually decided to focus on landscapes with figures, in the style of the Barbizon school. His works were very successful in the British Isles; winning awards at the 1862 International Exhibition in London and the Edinburgh Exposition of 1866.

Shortly after the latter event, the Scottish painter Sir George Reid visited Utrecht to take lessons from him and introduced Dutch painting styles to Scotland. This, however, was met with disapproval from the Royal Scottish Academy.

By this time, Mollinger was beginning to display the advanced symptoms of tuberculosis, which had been diagnosed the year before. From 1866 to 1867, he lived in Menton, on the French Riviera, seeking a cure, but the disease continued to worsen and he returned to Utrecht, where he died at his home. Friends and relatives took up a collection to erect a monument on his grave.

== Selected paintings ==
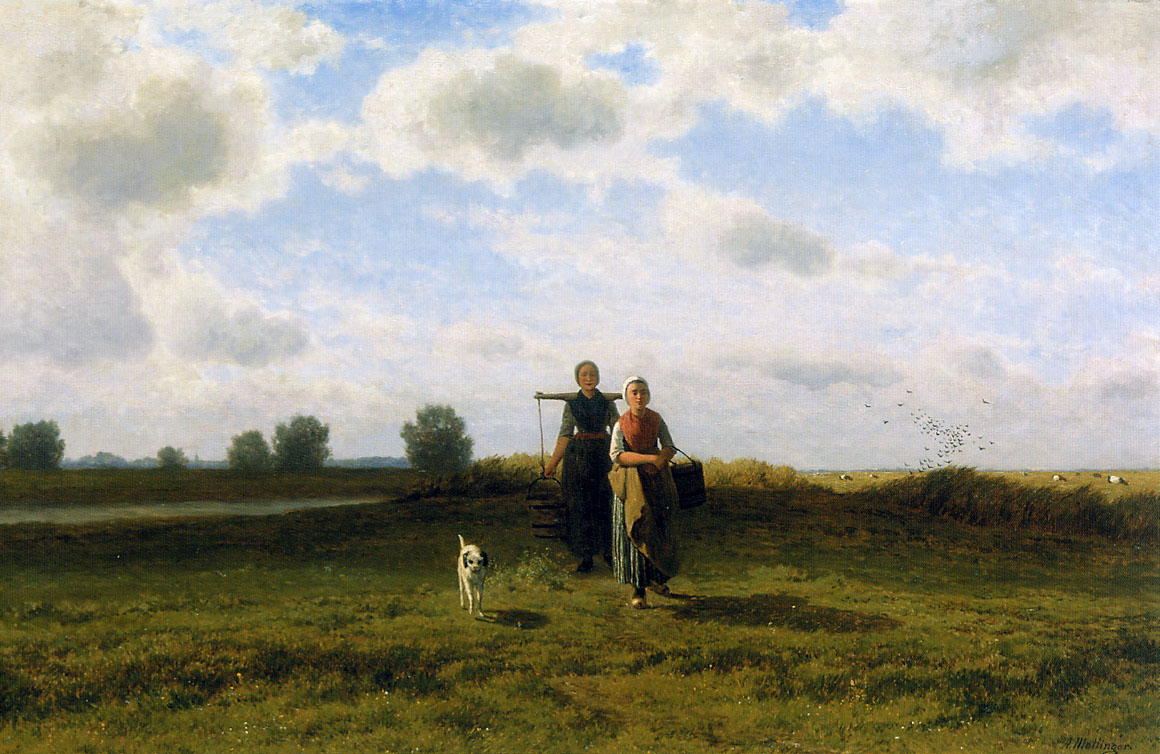
Carrying Milk

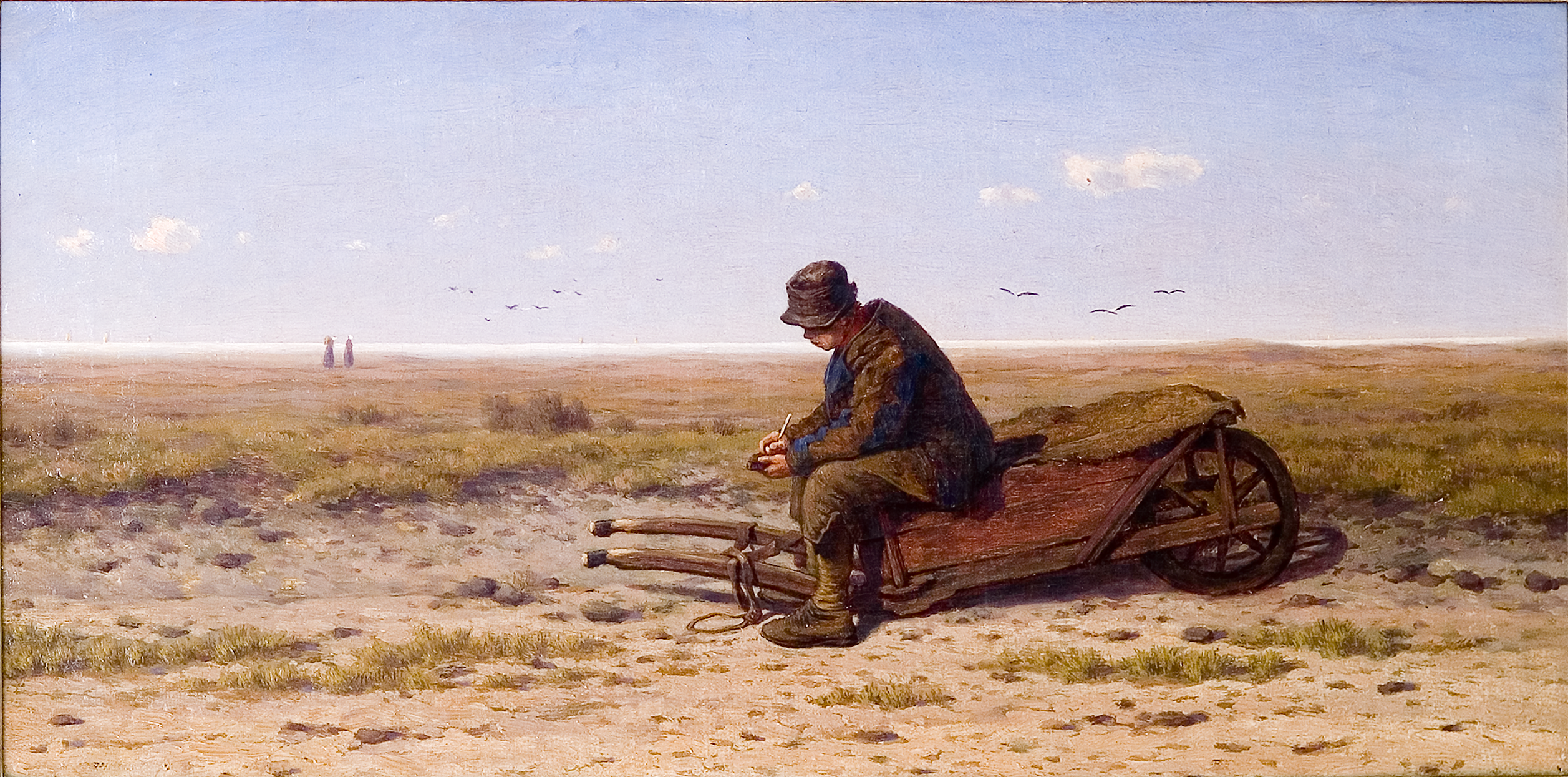
Filling a Pipe

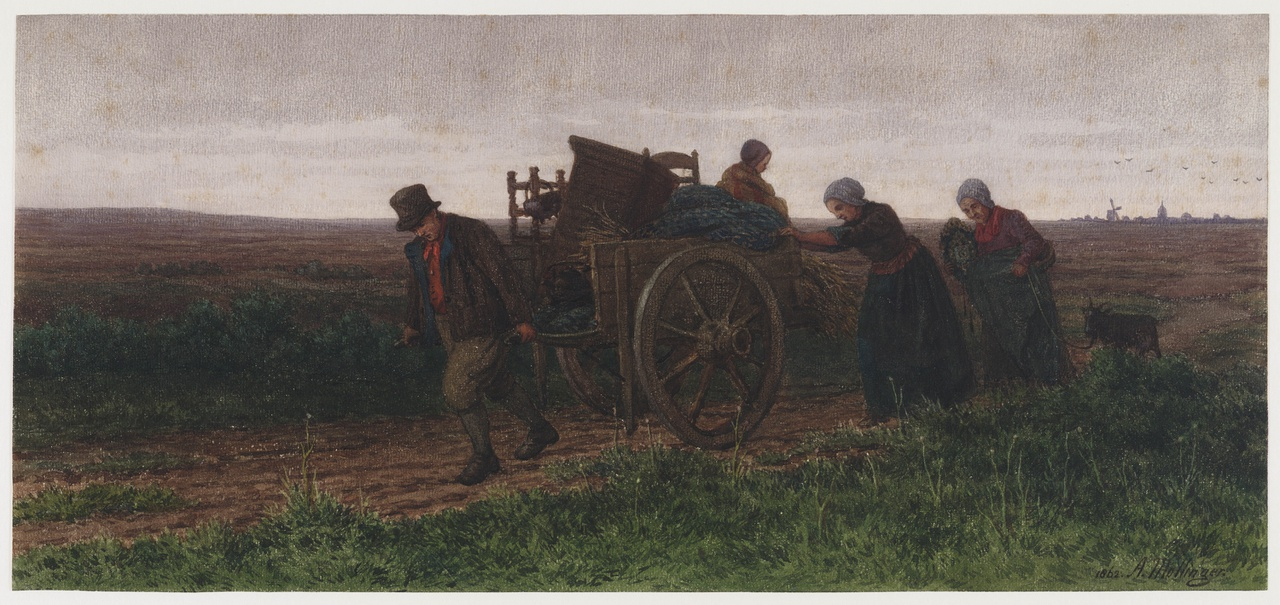
Moving at Night
