= Willem Roelofs =

Dutch painter and etcher (1822-1897)

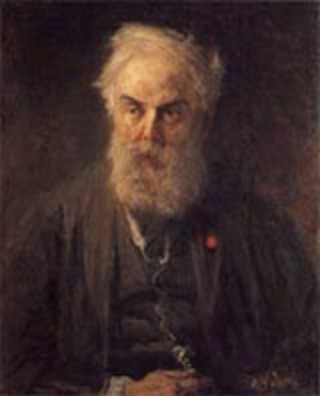
Willem Roelofs by Jozef Israëls, 1892

Willem Roelofs (10 March 1822 – 12 May 1897) was a Dutch painter, water-colourist, etcher, lithographer and draughtsman. Roelofs was one of the forerunners of the Dutch Revival art, after the Romantic Classicism of the beginning of the 19th century, which led to the formation of The Hague school. His landscapes, especially the early ones with their dominating cloudy skies, demure bodies of water and populated with cattle, are typical for the School of Barbizon.

== Biography ==
Willem Roelofs was born in Amsterdam, United Kingdom of the Netherlands on 10 March 1822. When he was a young man his family moved to Utrecht, where his father became an enlisted member of the Painters and Draughtsman Society in Utrecht, and received lessons from the artist Abraham Hendrik Winter. In June 1839, they moved to The Hague so that the young Willem could study in the Academy for Visual Arts in that city and train in the atelier of Hendrik van de Sande Bakhuyzen.

In 1847, he was involved in the establishment of the artists society “The Hague Pulchri Studio”. In 1847, he left The Hague rather suddenly and went to live in Brussels where he remained until 1887. From 1866 up to 1869, he trained Hendrik Willem Mesdag, who would develop into one of the masters of The Hague school. His other students were Paul Gabriël, Frans Smissaert, Willem de Famars Testas and Alexander Mollinger. In 1850, he was captivated by Barbizon in the Fontainebleau area of France. He returned there twice, in 1852 and 1855. He helped with the foundation of the Societé Belge Aquarellistes in Brussels in 1856.

He unmistakably provided the spiritual impulse for the painters of nature that would later dominate The Hague school. Beside painting, he also occupied himself with entomology, where he specialised in beetles. He published about them in scientific illustrated magazines and identified them for the museum of natural history in Leiden (the current Naturalis). In 1855, he founded the Belgian association for entomology, of which he became president in 1878. His extensive collection of Curculionidae became the basis of the entomological collection of beetles in the Natuurhistorisch Museum in Brussels. On his advice, Vincent van Gogh matriculated in autumn 1880 in Brussels.

Roelofs died in Berchem.

== Paintings ==
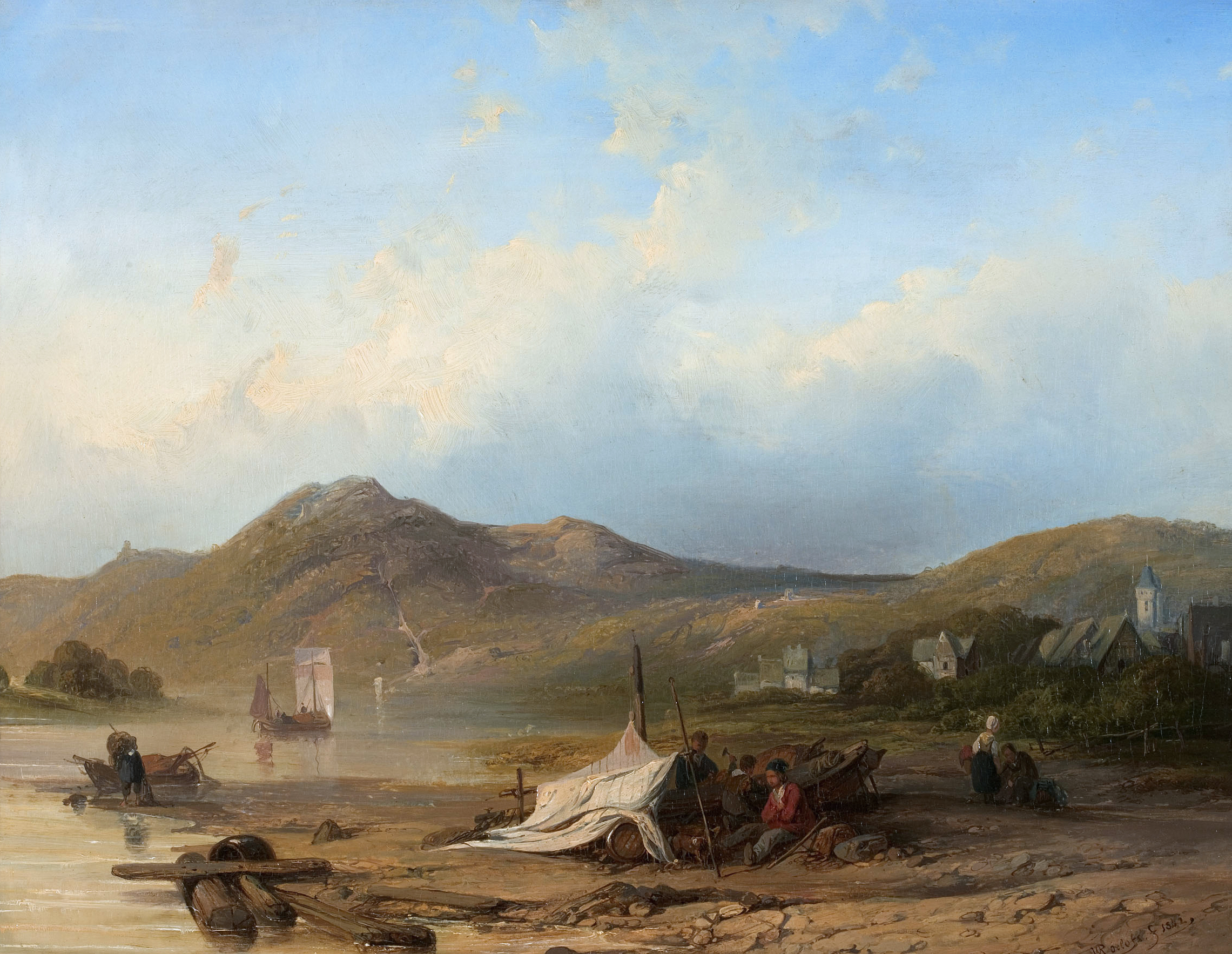
W. Roelofs, River landscape, 1842, oil on wooden panel, Gemeentemuseum Den Haag

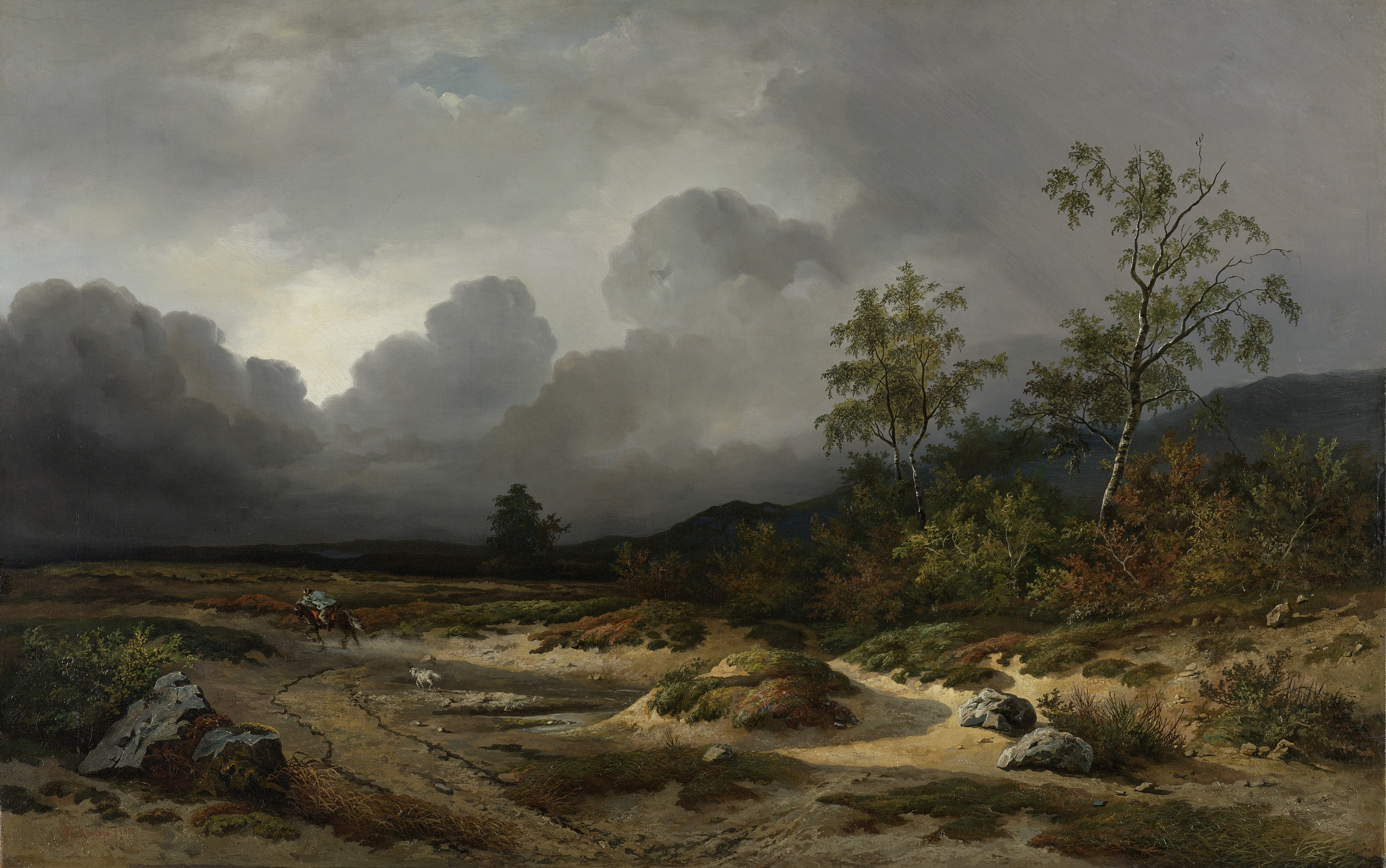
W. Roelofs, Landscape in an Approaching Storm, 1850, oil on canvas, Rijksmuseum

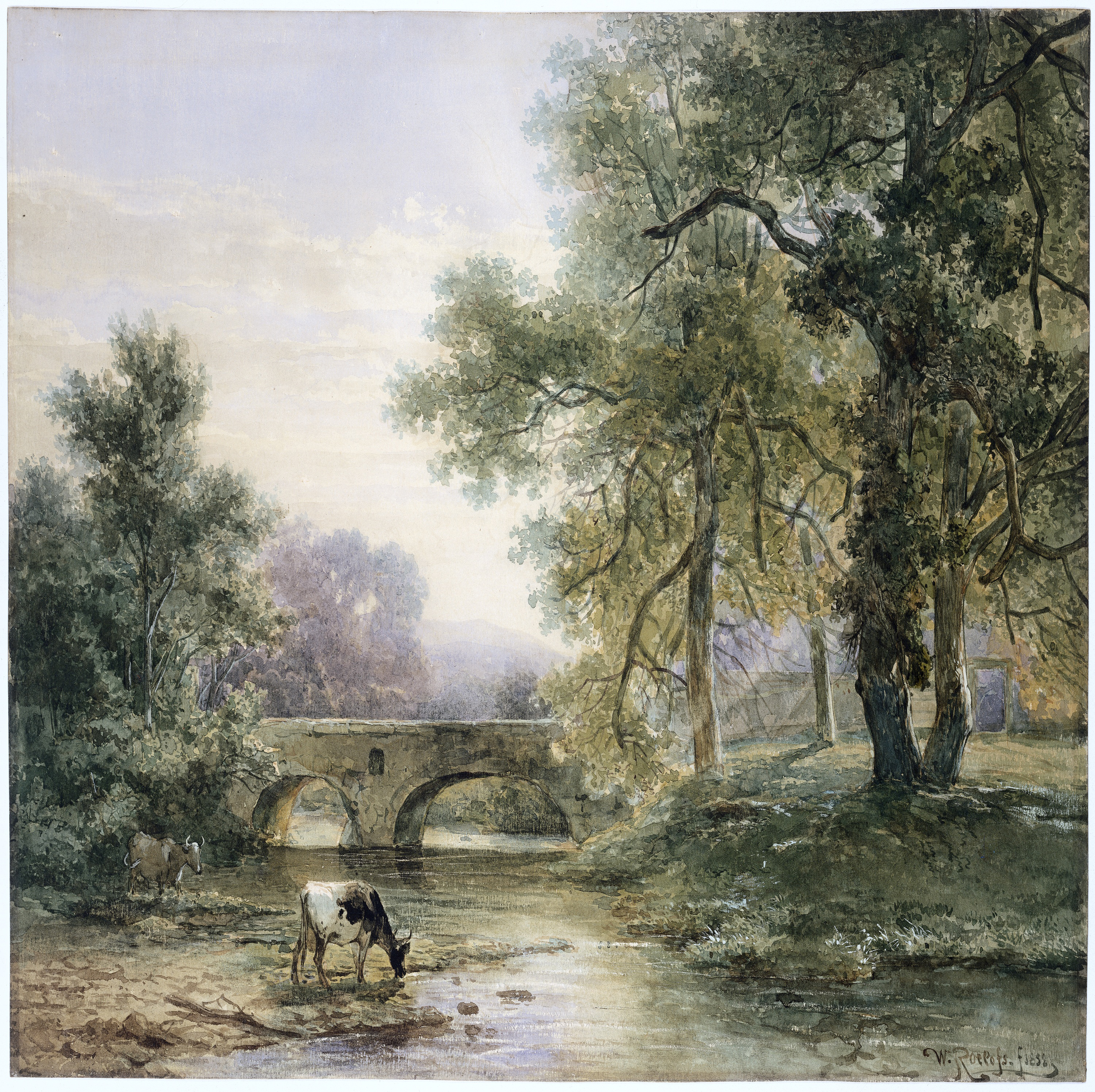
W. Roelofs, Wooded Landscape with Stone Bridge over a River, 1852, watercolor on paper

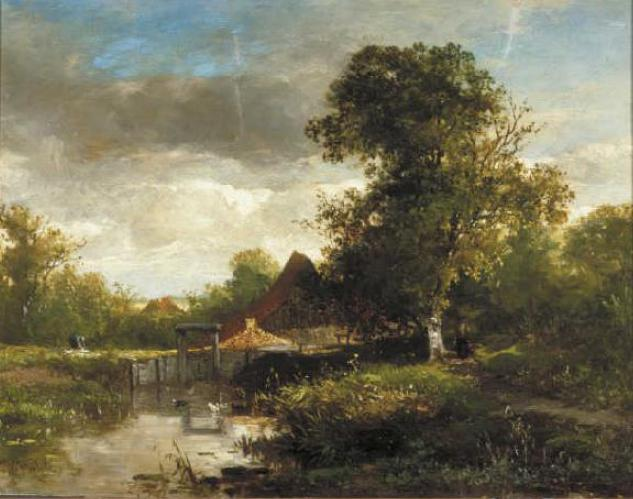
W. Roelofs, Landscape with Trees and Water, c. 1855, oil on wooden panel

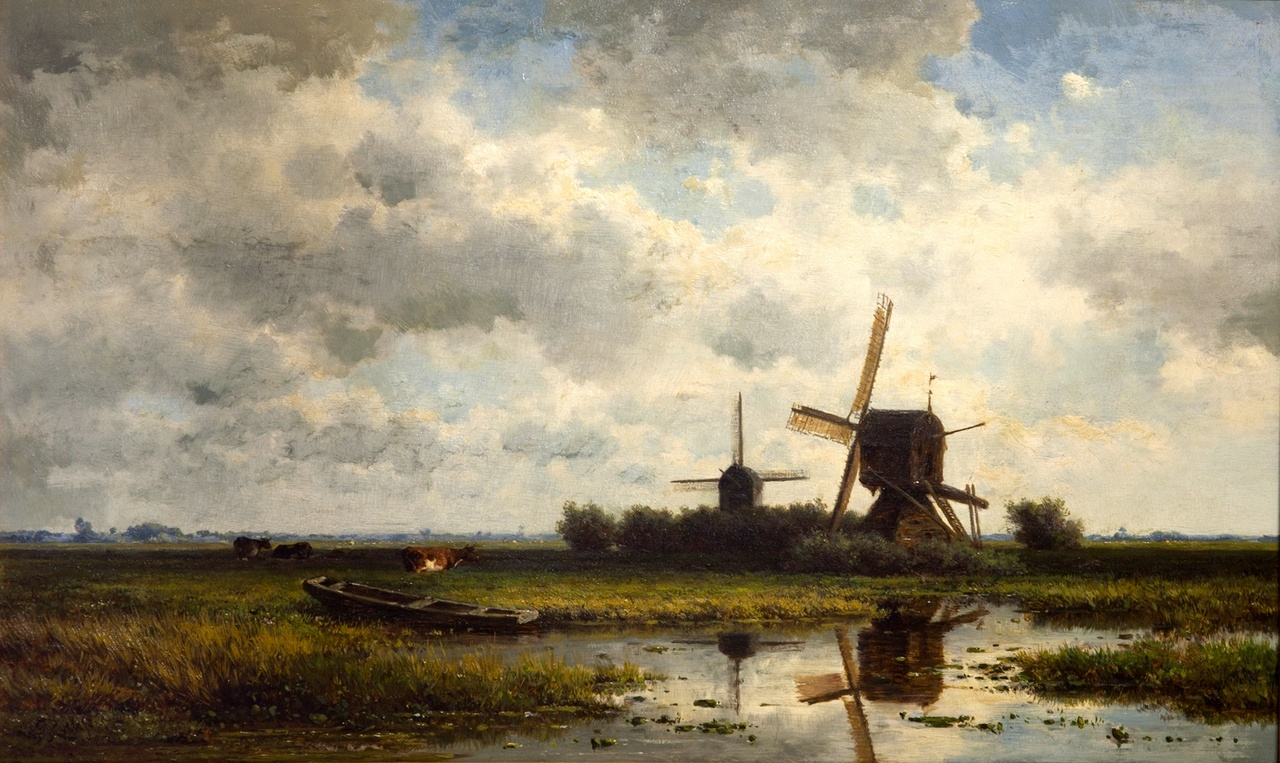
W. Roelofs, In 't Gein, c. 1860, oil-painting, in Teylers Museum

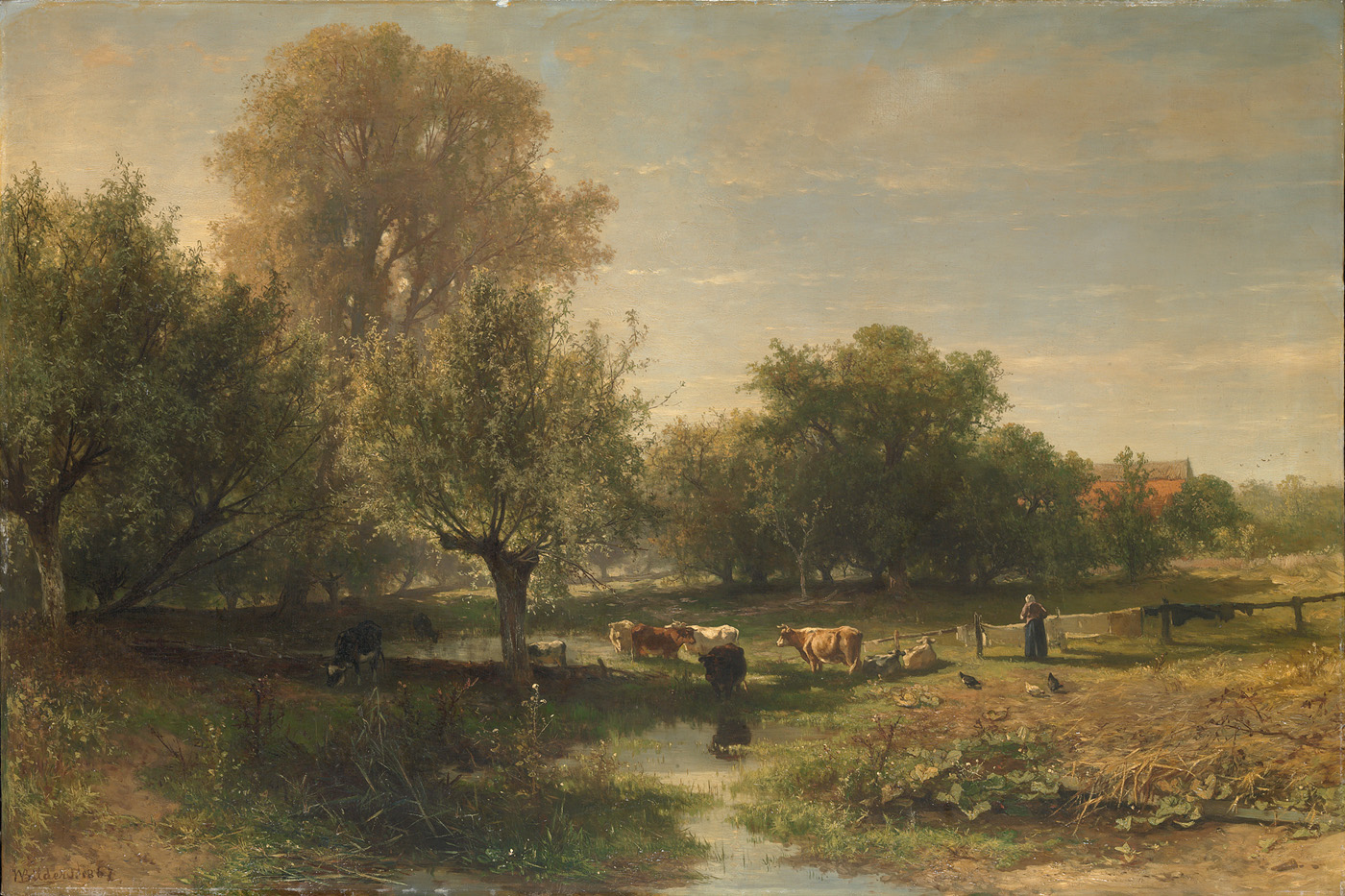
W. Roelofs, Landscape with cattle near Oosterbeek, 1867, oil on canvas, Amsterdam Museum

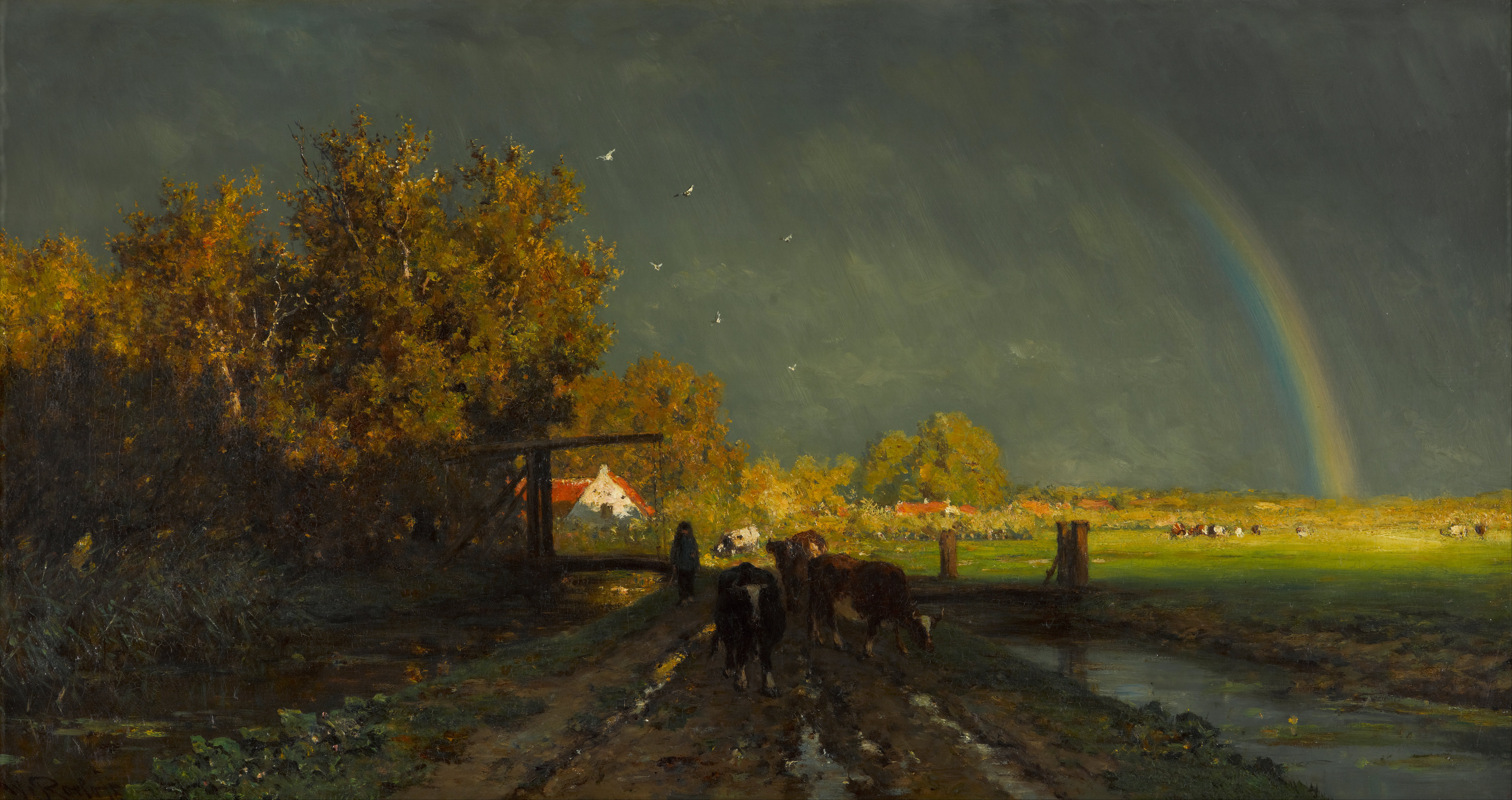
W. Roelofs, The Rainbow, 1875, oil on canvas, Gemeentemuseum Den Haag

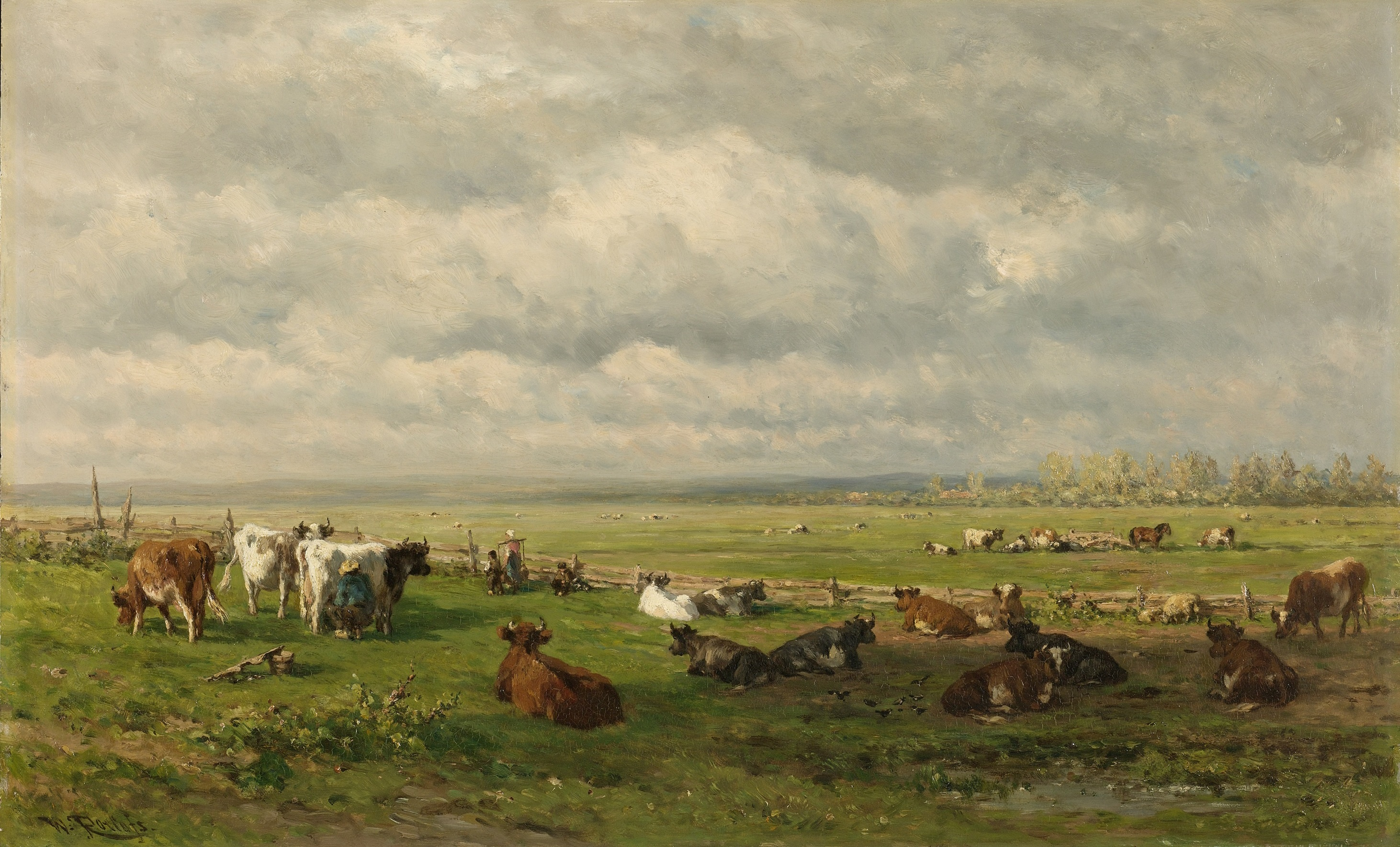
W. Roelofs, Pasture landscape with cattle, c. 1880, oil on canvas, Rijksmuseum

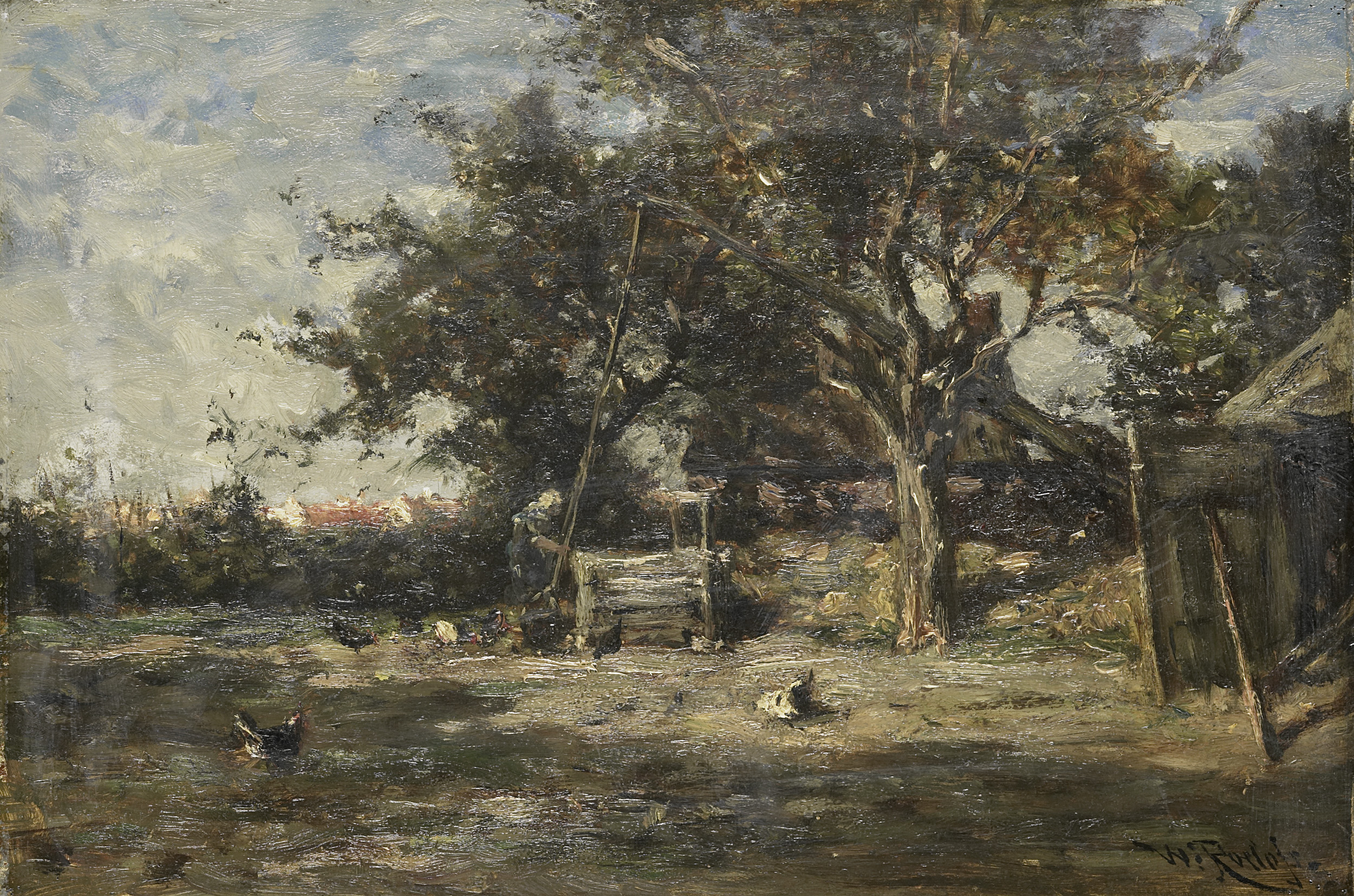
W. Roelofs, Farm near the village Noorden, c. 1880-85, oil on panel, Rijksmuseum

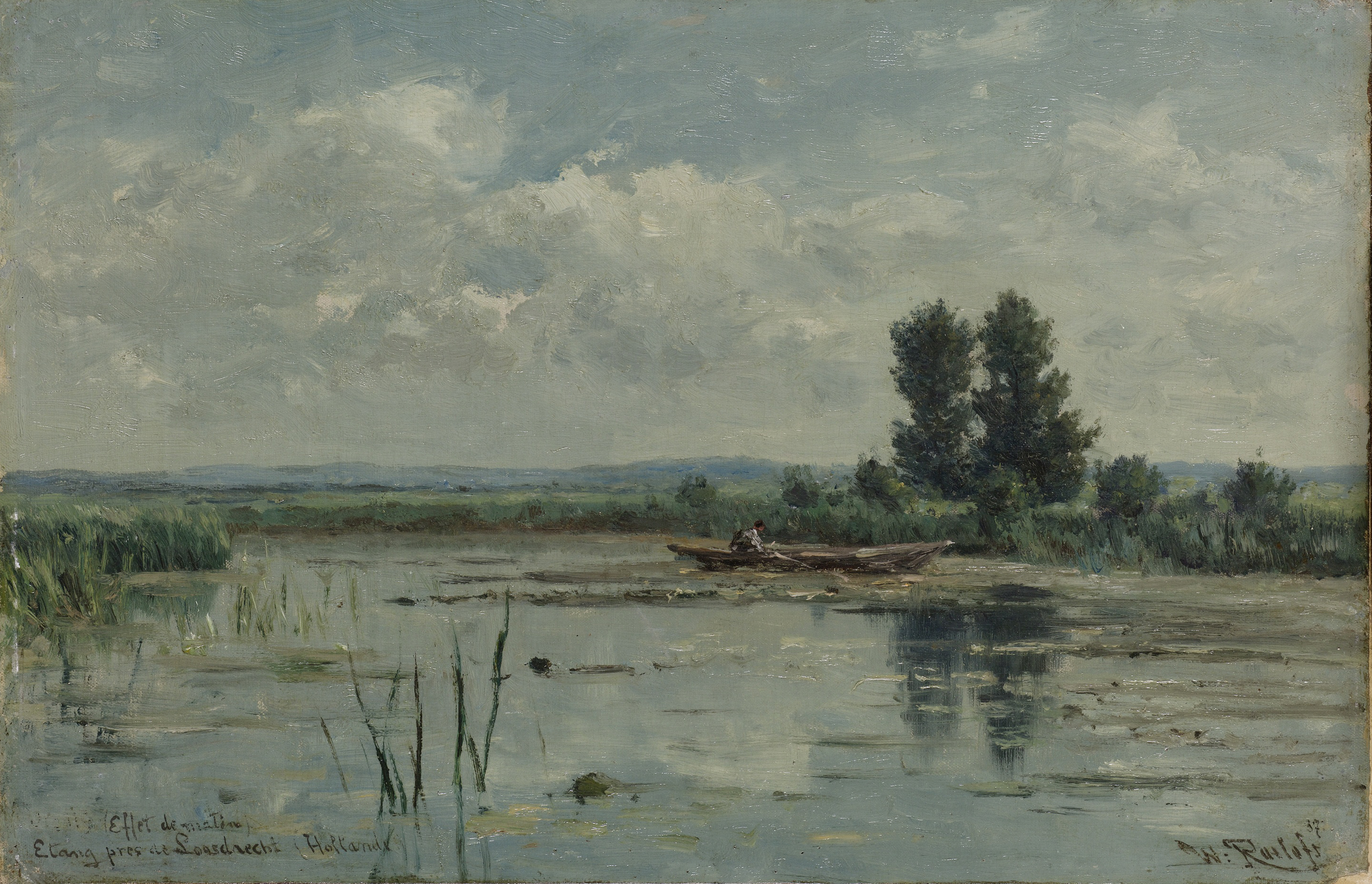
W. Roelofs, Morning atmosphere - Pond near Loosdrecht (early morning) 1887, oil on canvas, Rijksmuseum

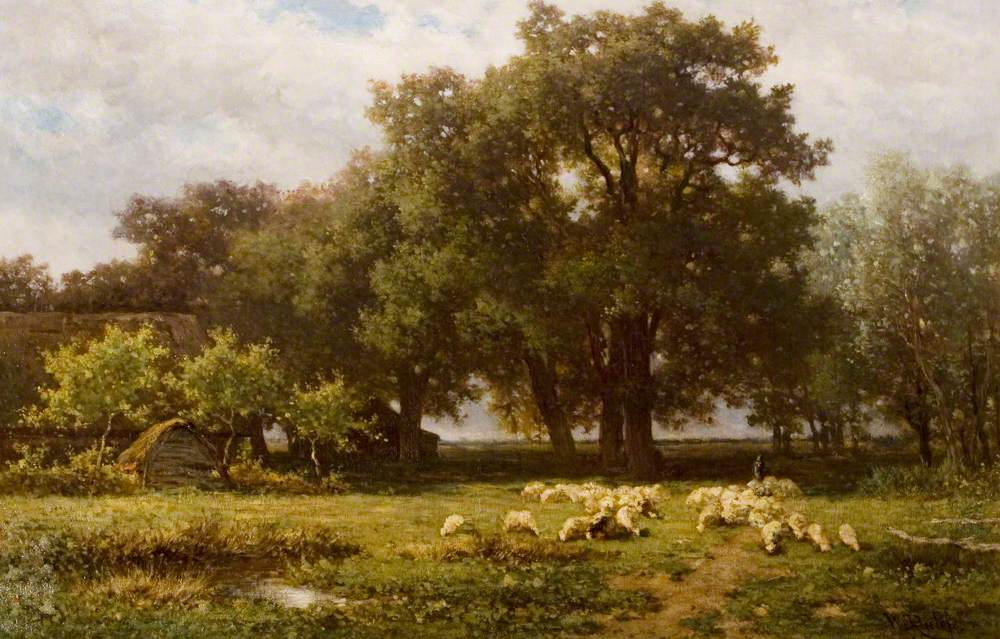
Landscape with Sheep and a Barn, oil on canvas, Herbert Art Gallery and Museum
