= List of artists in the collection of the Mauritshuis =

This is an incomplete list of artists in the collection of the Mauritshuis, with the number of artworks represented, and sorted by century of birth. The list also reflects artists whose works were formerly in the collection, or whose works were copied by other artists in the collection. For more information about the collection, see Mauritshuis. The collection includes over 800 paintings, 50 miniatures, 20 sculptures and a few drawings and prints. Of the over 300 artists in the collection, only five women are represented: Marie-Anne Collot, Judith Leyster, Maria van Oosterwijck, Clara Peeters, and Rachel Ruysch.

== Born in the 15th century ==
- Barbari, Jacopo de' (Venezia, ca. 1445 – Brussels, 1516), 1 work
- Bening, Alexander (Ghent, 1415 – Bruges, 1519), 1 work
- Benson, Ambrosius (Lombardy, 1484 – Bruges, 1550), 1 work
- Bouts, Aelbert (Leuven, 1451 – Leuven, 1549), 1 work
- Bouts, Dieric (Haarlem, 1415 – Leuven, 1475), 1 work
- Bruyn, Bartholomäus (Cologne, 1493 – Cologne, 1553), 1 work
- Cleve, Joos van (Kleef, 1485 – Antwerp, 1541), 2 works
- Cock, Jan Wellens de (Leiden, 1480 – Antwerp, 1527), 3 works
- Cornelisz. genaamd Kunst, Cornelis (Leiden, 1493 – Leiden, 1544), 3 works
- Antonio da Correggio (Correggio, 1489 – Correggio, 1534), 1 work
- Cranach, Lucas (Kronach, 1472 – Weimar, 1553), 2 works
- David, Gerard (Oudewater, 1460 – Bruges, 1523), 6 works
- Dürer, Albrecht (Nuremberg, 1471 – Nuremberg, 1528), 2 works
- Giorgione (Castelfranco, 1477 – Venice, 1510), 1 work
- Gossaert, Jan (Maubeuge, 1478 – Middelburg, 1532), 4 works
- Heemskerck, Maarten van (Heemskerk, 1498 – Haarlem, 1574), 4 works
- Holbein, Hans (Augsburg, 1497 – London, 1543), 3 works
- Isenbrant, Adriaen (Bruges, 1485 – Bruges, 1551), 1 work
- Kulmbach, Hans Süss von (Kulmbach, ca. 1480 – Nürnberg, 1522), 3 works
- Massijs, Quinten (Leuven, 1466 – Antwerp, 1530), 2 works
- Master of Alkmaar (Alkmaar, 1475 – Alkmaar, 1515), 6 works
- Master of Frankfurt (1460 – 1520), 4 works
- Master of the legend of St. Barbara (1470 – 1500), 1 work
- Memling, Hans (Seligenstadt, 1430 – Bruges, 1494), 1 work
- Patinir, Joachim (Antwerp, 1480 – Antwerp, 1524), 1 work
- Piero di Cosimo (Florence, 1462 – Florence, 1521), 2 works
- Provoost, Jan (Mons, 1462 – Bruges, 1529), 2 works
- Sittow, Michiel (Reval, 1469 – Tallinn, 1525), 1 work
- Swart van Groningen, Jan (Groningen, 1495 – Antwerp, 1560), 1 work
- Weyden, Rogier van der (Tournai, 1400 – Brussels, 1464), 1 work

== Born in the 16th century ==
- Aertsen, Pieter (Amsterdam, 1508 – Amsterdam, 1575), 1 work
- Amstel, Jan van (Amsterdam, 1500 – Antwerp, 1540), 1 work
- Anonymous Antwerp Mannerist (Antwerp, 1500 – Antwerp, 1530), 3 works
- Ast, Balthasar van der (Middelburg, 1593 – Delft, 1656), 4 works
- Avercamp, Hendrick (Amsterdam, 1585 – Kampen, 1634), 1 work
- Balen, Hendrick van (Antwerp, 1575 – Antwerp, 1632), 4 works
- Bassen, Bartholomeus van (Antwerp, 1590 – The Hague, 1652), 1 work
- Berghe, Christoffel van den (Middelburg, 1590 – Middelburg, 1638), 1 work
- Beuckelaer, Joachim (Antwerp, 1533 – Antwerp, 1574), 2 works
- Bles, Herri met de (Dinant, 1510 – Antwerp, 1510), 1 work
- Bloemaert, Abraham (Gorinchem, 1564 – Utrecht, 1651), 3 works
- Bosschaert, Ambrosius (Antwerp, 1573 – The Hague, 1621), 1 work
- Bray, Salomon de (Amsterdam, 1597 – Haarlem, 1664), 1 work
- Breenbergh, Bartholomeus (Deventer, 1598 – Amsterdam, 1657), 3 works
- Bril, Paul (Antwerp, 1554 – Rome, 1626), 1 work
- Brueghel, Jan (Brussels, 1568 – Antwerp, 1624), 9 works
- Terbrugghen, Hendrick (Deventer, 1588 – Utrecht, 1629), 1 work
- Bunel, Francois II (Blois, 1500 – Blois, 1550), 1 work
- Cambiaso, Luca (Genova, 1527 – Madrid, 1585), 2 works
- Campen, Jacob van (Haarlem, 1595 – Amersfoort, 1657), 2 works
- Carracci, Annibale (Bologna, 1560 – Rome, 1609), 1 work
- Claesz., Pieter (Berchem, 1597 – Haarlem, 1660), 4 works
- Codde, Pieter (Amsterdam, 1599 – Amsterdam, 1678), 3 works
- Cornelis, Albert (Bruges, 1500 – Bruges, 1532), 1 work
- Cornelisz. van Haarlem, Cornelis (Haarlem, 1562 – Haarlem, 1637), 6 works
- Droochsloot, Joost Cornelisz. (Utrecht, 1630 – Utrecht, 1673), 1 work
- Duyster, Willem Cornelisz. (Amsterdam, 1599 – Amsterdam, 1635), 1 work
- Dyck, Anthony van (Antwerp, 1599 – London, 1641), 9 works
- Eertvelt, Andries van (Antwerp, 1590 – Antwerp, 1652), 1 work
- Elsheimer, Adam (Frankfurt, 1578 – Rome, 1610), 2 works
- Fogolino, Marcello (Vicenza, ca. 1485 – Vicenza, after 1548), 1 work
- Francken, Frans (Antwerp, 1581 – Antwerp, 1642), 2 works
- Gheyn, Jacob de (Antwerp, 1565 – The Hague, 1629), 1 work
- Goltzius, Hendrick (Venlo, 1558 – Haarlem, 1617), 3 works
- Govaerts, Abraham (Antwerp, 1589 – Antwerp, 1626), 1 work
- Goyen, Jan Josefsz. van (Leiden, 1596 – The Hague, 1656), 10 works
- Haecht, Willem van (Antwerp, 1593 – Antwerp, 1637), 1 work
- Hals, Dirck (Haarlem, 1591 – Haarlem, 1656), 6 works
- Hals, Frans (Antwerp, 1582 – Haarlem, 1666), 5 works
- Heda, Willem Claesz. (Haarlem, 1594 – Haarlem, 1680), 2 works
- Hemessen, Jan van (Hemiksem, 1500 – Haarlem, 1575), 2 works
- Hillegaert, Paulus van (Amsterdam, 1596 – Amsterdam, 1640), 1 work
- Honthorst, Gerard van (Utrecht, 1592 – Utrecht, 1656), 7 works
- Jonson van Ceulen, Cornelis (London, 1593 – Utrecht, 1661), 1 work
- Jordaens, Jacob (Antwerp, 1593 – Antwerp, 1678), 3 works
- Key, Adriaen Thomasz. (Antwerp, 1544 – Antwerp, 1589), 1 work
- Keyser, Hendrik de (Utrecht, 1565 – Amsterdam, 1621), 2 works
- Keyser, Thomas de (Amsterdam, 1596 – Amsterdam, 1667), 5 works
- Laer, Pieter van (Haarlem, 1592 – Haarlem, 1642), 1 work
- Lapp, Jan Willemsz. (The Hague, 1585 – Amsterdam, 1663), 3 works
- Lastman, Pieter (Amsterdam, 1583 – Amsterdam, 1633), 1 work
- Lisse, Dirck van der (The Hague, 1607 – The Hague, 1669), 1 work
- Master of the Brandon Portrait (1500 – 1530), 1 work
- Master of the Female Half-Lengths (Antwerp, 1500 – Antwerp, 1540), 2 works
- Mierevelt, Michiel Jansz. van (Delft, 1567 – Delft, 1641), 10 works
- Moeyaert, Nicolaes (Durgerdam, 1592 – Amsterdam, 1655), 3 works
- Mol, Peter van (1599 – 1650), 1 work
- Momper, Joos de (Antwerp, 1564 – Antwerp, 1635), 1 work
- Amstel, Jan van (Amsterdam, 1500 – Antwerp, 1540), 1 work
- Moreelse, Paulus (Utrecht, 1571 – Utrecht, 1638), 3 works
- Moro, Antonio (Utrecht, 1520 – Antwerp, 1576), 2 works
- Peeters, Clara (Antwerp, 1580 – Antwerp, 1641), 3 works
- Pietersz., Pieter (Antwerp, 1540 – Amsterdam, 1603), 5 works
- Poelenburch, Cornelis van (Utrecht, 1595 – Utrecht, 1667), 3 works
- Porcellis, Jan (Ghent, 1584 – Zoeterwoude, 1632), 1 work
- Pot, Hendrik Cornelisz (Amsterdam, 1585 – Amsterdam, 1657), 5 works
- Pourbus, Pieter (Gouda, 1523 – Bruges, 1584), 1 work
- Ravesteyn, Jan Antonisz. van (The Hague, 1572 – The Hague, 1657), 9 works
- Rottenhammer, Hans (Munich, 1564 – Augsburg, 1625), 2 works
- Rubens, Peter Paul (Antwerp, 1577 – Antwerp, 1640), 15 works
- Saenredam, Pieter Jansz. (Assendelft, 1597 – Haarlem, 1665), 1 work
- Savery, Jacob (Kortrijk, 1565 – Amsterdam, 1603), 1 work
- Savery, Roelant (Kortrijk, 1576 – Utrecht, 1639), 3 works
- Seghers, Daniël (Antwerp, 1590 – Antwerp, 1661), 2 works
- Snijders, Frans (Antwerp, 1579 – Antwerp, 1657), 2 works
- Soutman, Pieter Claesz. (Haarlem, 1580 – Haarlem, 1657), 1 work
- Velde, Esaias van de (Amsterdam, 1587 – The Hague, 1630), 2 works
- Velázquez, Diego Rodriguez de Silva y (Sevilla, 1599 – Madrid, 1660), 1 work
- Venne, Adriaen Pietersz. van de (Delft, 1589 – The Hague, 1662), 1 work
- Verspronck, Johannes Cornelisz. (Haarlem, 1600 – Haarlem, 1662), 3 works
- Verstraelen, Anthonie (Gorinchem, 1593 – Amsterdam, 1641), 1 work
- Vinckboons, David (Mechelen, 1576 – Amsterdam, 1629), 2 works
- Vos, Cornelis de (Hulst, 1584 – Antwerp, 1651), 1 work
- Vos, Maerten de (Antwerp, 1532 – Antwerp, 1603), 1 work
- Vos, Paul de (Hulst, 1593 – Antwerp, 1678), 2 works
- Voskuijl, Huijgh Pietersz. (1591 – 1665), 1 work
- Vredeman de Vries, Paul (Antwerp, 1567 – Amsterdam, 1617), 1 work
- Wildens, Jan (Antwerp, 1595 – Antwerp, 1653), 1 work
- Willaerts, Adam (London, 1577 – Utrecht, 1664), 1 work

== Born in the 17th century ==
- Aelst, Willem van (Delft, 1627 – Amsterdam, 1683), 2 works
- Anraedt, Pieter van (Utrecht, 1635 – Deventer, 1678), 1 work
- Asselijn, Jan (Diemen or Dieppe, 1615 – Amsterdam, 1652), 1 work
- Backer, Jacob Adriaensz. (Harlingen, 1608 – Amsterdam, 1651), 4 works
- Baen, Jan de (Haarlem, 1633 – The Hague, 1702), 2 works
- Bakhuizen, Ludolf (Emden, 1631 – Amsterdam, 1708), 3 works
- Beest, Sybrand van (c.1610 – 1674), 1 work
- Beijeren, Leendert van (Amsterdam, 1619 – Amsterdam, 1649), 6 works
- Bellevois, Jacob Adriaensz. (Rotterdam, 1621 – Rotterdam, 1676), 1 work
- Berchem, Nicolaes Pietersz. (Haarlem, 1620 – Amsterdam, 1683), 4 works
- Berckheyde, Gerrit Adriaensz. (Haarlem, 1638 – Haarlem, 1698), 2 works
- Berckheyde, Job Adriaensz. (Haarlem, 1630 – Haarlem, 1692), 1 work
- Berckman, Hendrick (Klundert, 1629 – Middelburg, 1678), 1 work
- Bol, Ferdinand (Dordrecht, 1616 – Amsterdam, 1680), 10 works
- Bor, Paulus (Amersfoort, 1601 – Amersfoort, 1669), 1 work
- Borch, Gerard ter (Zwolle, 1617 – Deventer, 1681), 6 works
- Borssom, Anthonie van (Amsterdam, 1631 – Amsterdam, 1677), 1 work
- Both, Jan (Utrecht, 1618 – Utrecht, 1652), 1 work
- Brakenburgh, Richard (Haarlem, 1650 – Haarlem, 1702), 1 work
- Bray, Dirck de (Haarlem, 1635 – Haarlem, 1694), 1 work
- Bray, Jan de (Haarlem, 1627 – Haarlem, 1697), 2 works
- Brekelenkam, Quiringh Gerritsz. van (Zwammerdam, 1622 – Leiden, 1670), 1 work
- Brouwer, Adriaen (Oudenaarde, 1605 – Antwerp, 1638), 4 works
- Calraet, Abraham van (Dordrecht, 1642 – Dordrecht, 1722), 1 work
- Cappelle, Jan van de (Amsterdam, 1626 – Amsterdam, 1679), 3 works
- Cerezo, Mateo the Younger (Burgos, 1637 – Madrid, 1666), 1 work
- Collier, Edwaert (Breda, 1642 – London, 1708), 1 work
- Cooghen, Leendert van der (Haarlem, 1632 – Haarlem, 1681), 1 work
- Cooper, Samuel (London, 1609 – London, 1672), 1 work
- Coorte, Adriaen (Middelburg, 1660 – Middelburg, 1707), 6 works
- Coques, Gonzales (Antwerp, 1614 – Antwerp, 1683), 1 work
- Cuylenborch, Abraham van (Utrecht, ca. 1610 – Utrecht, 1658), 1 work
- Cuyp, Aelbert (Dordrecht, 1620 – Dordrecht, 1691), 6 works
- Delen, Dirck van (Heusden, 1605 – Arnemuiden, 1671), 2 works
- Dijk, Philip van (Oud-Beijerland, 1683 – The Hague, 1753), 6 works
- Does, Simon van der (The Hague, 1653 – Antwerp, 1717), 1 work
- Dou, Gerard (Leiden, 1613 – Leiden, 1675), 7 works
- Drost, Willem (Amsterdam, 1633 – Amsterdam, 1659), 1 work
- Dubois, Guillam (Haarlem, 1623 – Haarlem, 1661), 2 works
- Dujardin, Karel (Amsterdam, 1626 – Venice, 1678), 3 works
- Dusart, Cornelis (Haarlem, 1660 – Haarlem, 1704), 1 work
- Eckhout, Albert (Groningen, 1610 – Groningen, 1665), 1 work
- Eeckhout, Gerbrand van den (Amsterdam, 1621 – Amsterdam, 1674), 2 works
- Ehrenberg, Wilhelm Schubert van (1630 – 1687), 1 work
- Everdingen, Allaert van (Alkmaar, 1621 – Amsterdam, 1675), 1 work
- Everdingen, Cesar Boetius van (Alkmaar, 1617 – Alkmaar, 1678), 3 works
- Fabritius, Barent (Middenbeemster, 1624 – Amsterdam, 1673), 1 work
- Fabritius, Carel (Middenbeemster, 1622 – Delft, 1654), 4 works
- Fijt, Joannes (Antwerp, 1611 – Antwerp, 1661), 3 works
- Flinck, Govert (Cleves, 1615 – Amsterdam, 1660), 6 works
- Gelder, Aert de (Dordrecht, 1645 – Dordrecht, 1727), 4 works
- Glauber, Johannes (Utrecht, 1646 – Schoonhoven, 1726), 5 works
- Haagen, Joris van der (Arnhem, 1615 – The Hague, 1669), 2 works
- Hackaert, Jan (Amsterdam, 1628 – Amsterdam, 1685), 1 work
- Haensbergen, Jan van (Gorinchem, 1642 – The Hague, 1705), 3 works
- Hals, Nicolaes (Haarlem, 1628 – Haarlem, 1686), 1 work
- Hanneman, Adriaen (The Hague, 1603 – The Hague, 1671), 5 works
- Heda, Gerret Willemsz. (Haarlem, 1622 – Haarlem, 1649), 1 work
- Heem, Cornelis de (Leiden, 1631 – Antwerp, 1695), 1 work
- Heem, Jan Davidsz. de (Utrecht, 1606 – Antwerp, 1683), 3 works
- Heerschop, Hendrick (Haarlem, 1626 – Haarlem, 1690), 1 work
- Helst, Bartholomeus van der (Haarlem, 1613 – Amsterdam, 1670), 3 works
- Heusch, Willem de (Utrecht, 1625 – Utrecht, 1692), 2 works
- Heyden, Jan van der (Gorinchem, 1637 – Amsterdam, 1712), 2 works
- Hobbema, Meindert (Amsterdam, 1638 – Amsterdam, 1709), 3 works
- Hondecoeter, Gijsbert Gillisz. de (Utrecht, 1604 – Utrecht, 1653), 1 work
- Hondecoeter, Melchior d' (Utrecht, 1636 – Amsterdam, 1695), 4 works
- Hooch, Pieter de (Rotterdam, 1629 – Amsterdam, 1683), 2 works
- Huchtenburg, Jacob van (Haarlem, 1644 – Amsterdam, 1675), 3 works
- Huysum, Jan van (Amsterdam, 1682 – Amsterdam, 1749), 5 works
- Kalf, Willem (Rotterdam, 1619 – Amsterdam, 1693), 6 works
- Keirincx, Alexander (Antwerp, 1600 – Amsterdam, 1652), 1 work
- Kessel, Jan (Amsterdam, 1641 – Amsterdam, 1680), 1 work
- Koninck, Philips (Amsterdam, 1619 – Amsterdam, 1688), 1 work
- Koninck, Salomon (Amsterdam, 1609 – Amsterdam, 1656), 1 work
- Lairesse, Gerard de (Liège, 1640 – Amsterdam, 1711), 2 works
- Leyster, Judith (Haarlem, 1609 – Heemstede, 1660), 1 work
- Lievens, Jan (Leiden, 1607 – Amsterdam, 1674), 2 works
- Lingelbach, Johannes (Frankfurt am Main, 1622 – Amsterdam, 1674), 4 works
- Logteren, Ignatius van (Amsterdam, 1685 – Amsterdam, 1732), 1 work
- Loo, Jacob van (Sluis, 1614 – Paris, 1670), 2 works
- Luttichuys, Isaack (London, 1616 – Amsterdam, 1673), 1 work
- Maes, Nicolaes (Dordrecht, 1634 – Amsterdam, 1693), 6 works
- Man, Cornelis de (Delft, 1621 – Delft, 1706), 1 work
- Mancadan, Jacob Sibrandi (Minnertsga, 1602 – Tjerkgaast, 1680), 2 works
- Marseus van Schrieck, Otto (Nijmegen, 1619 – Amsterdam, 1678), 1 work
- Mazo, Juan Bautista Martinez del (Cuenza, 1610/15 – Madrid, 1667), 1 work
- Metsu, Gabriël (Leiden, 1629 – Amsterdam, 1667), 3 works
- Mieris, Frans van (Leiden, 1635 – Leiden, 1681), 5 works
- Mieris, Willem van (Leiden, 1662 – Leiden, 1747), 2 works
- Mignon, Abraham (Frankfurt am Main, 1640 – Utrecht, 1679), 3 works
- Mijtens, Johannes (The Hague, 1614 – The Hague, 1670), 5 works
- Molenaer, Jan Miense (Haarlem, 1610 – Haarlem, 1688), 7 works
- Moni, Louis de (Breda, 1698 – Leiden, 1771), 2 works
- Moreelse, Johan (1612 – 1634), 1 work
- Morel, Jean Baptiste (Antwerp, 1662 – Brussels, 1732), 2 works
- Moucheron, Frederik de (Emden, 1633 – Amsterdam, 1686), 2 works
- Mulier, Pieter (Haarlem, 1600 – Haarlem, 1659), 1 work
- Murillo, Bartolomé Esteban (Sevilla, 1617 – Sevilla, 1682), 1 work
- Musscher, Michiel van (Rotterdam, 1645 – Amsterdam, 1705), 2 works
- Nason, Pieter (1612 – 1690), 2 works
- Neer, Aert van der (Amsterdam, 1603 – Amsterdam, 1677), 3 works
- Neer, Eglon van der (Amsterdam, 1634 – Düsseldorf, 1703), 2 works
- Netscher, Caspar (Heidelberg, 1639 – The Hague, 1684), 4 works
- Netscher, Constantijn (The Hague, 1668 – The Hague, 1723), 2 works
- Nickelen, Jan van (Haarlem, 1655 – Kassel, 1721), 1 work
- Noort, Pieter van (1622 – 1672), 1 work
- Ochtervelt, Jacob (Rotterdam, 1634 – Amsterdam, 1682), 1 work
- Oever, Hendrick ten (Zwolle, 1639 – Zwolle, 1716), 1 work
- Olis, Jan (Gorinchem, 1610 – Heusden, 1676), 1 work
- Oliver, Peter (London, 1594 – London, 1647), 2 works
- Oost, Jacob van (Bruges, 1603 – Bruges, 1671), 1 work
- Oosterwijck, Maria van (Nootdorp, 1630 – Uitdam, 1693), 2 works
- Ostade, Adriaen van (Haarlem, 1610 – Haarlem, 1685), 4 works
- Ostade, Isaac van (Haarlem, 1621 – Haarlem, 1649), 3 works
- Palamedesz., Anthonie (Delft, 1601 – Amsterdam, 1673), 2 works
- Pellegrini GA, Giovanni Antonio (Venezia, 1675 – Venezia, 1741), 1 work
- Pierson, Christoffel (The Hague, 1631 – Gouda, 1714), 1 work
- Pijnacker, Adam (Schiedam, 1622 – Amsterdam, 1673), 1 work
- Pluym, Karel van der (Leiden, 1625 – Leiden, 1672), 1 work
- Poel, Egbert Lievensz. van der (Delft, 1621 – Rotterdam, 1664), 1 work
- Poorter, Willem de (Haarlem, 1608 – Heusden, 1649), 1 work
- Post, Frans Jansz. (Leiden, 1612 – Haarlem, 1680), 2 works
- Post, Pieter Jansz. (Haarlem, 1608 – The Hague, 1669), 2 works
- Potter, Paulus (Enkhuizen, 1625 – Amsterdam, 1654), 4 works
- Quast, Pieter Jansz. (Amsterdam, 1606 – Amsterdam, 1647), 2 works
- Ragueneau, Abraham (London, 1623 – London, 1690), 1 work
- Ravesteyn, Arnold van (The Hague, 1605 – The Hague, 1690), 1 work
- Rembrandt, Rembrandt (Leiden, 1606 – Amsterdam, 1669), 21 works
- Renesse, Constantijn à (Maarssen, 1626 – Eindhoven, 1680), 1 work
- Rousseaux, Jacques des (Tourcoing, 1600 – Leiden, 1638), 1 work
- Ruisdael, Jacob Isaacksz. van (Haarlem, 1628 – Haarlem, 1682), 6 works
- Ruysch, Rachel (The Hague, 1664 – Amsterdam, 1750), 2 works
- Ruysdael, Salomon van (Naarden, 1602 – Haarlem, 1670), 3 works
- Saftleven, Cornelis (Gorinchem, 1607 – Rotterdam, 1681), 1 work
- Schalcken, Godfried (Made, 1643 – The Hague, 1706), 5 works
- Steen, Jan Havicksz. (Leiden, 1626 – Leiden, 1679), 13 works
- Steenwijck, Harmen (Delft, 1612 – Leiden, 1656), 1 work
- Stoop, Dirk (Utrecht, 1615 – Utrecht, 1686), 1 work
- Storck, Abraham (Amsterdam, 1644 – Amsterdam, 1708), 2 works
- Sweerts, Michael (Brussels, 1618 – Goa, 1664), 3 works
- Tempel, Abraham van den (Leeuwarden, 1622 – Amsterdam, 1672), 3 works
- Teniers, David (Antwerp, 1610 – Brussels, 1690), 4 works
- Terwesten, Augustinus (The Hague, 1649 – Berlin, 1711), 1 work
- Thopas, Jan (1620 – 1690), 1 work
- Tilborgh, Gillis van (1615 – 1675), 1 work
- Tol, Domenicus van (Bodegraven, 1635 – Leiden, 1676), 1 work
- Troost, Cornelis (Amsterdam, 1697 – Amsterdam, 1750), 1 work
- Ulft, Jacob van der (Gorinchem, 1627 – Noordwijk, 1690), 1 work
- Velde, Adriaen van de (Amsterdam, 1636 – Amsterdam, 1672), 3 works
- Velde, Willem van de (Leiden, 1633 – London, 1707), 5 works
- Verhulst, Rombout (Mechelen, 1624 – The Hague, 1698), 5 works
- Verkolje, Jan (Amsterdam, 1650 – Delft, 1693), 1 work
- Vermeer van Haarlem, Jan (Haarlem, 1628 – Haarlem, 1691), 1 work
- Vermeer, Johannes (Delft, 1632 – Delft, 1675), 4 works
- Verschuring, Hendrick (Gorinchem, 1627 – Dordrecht, 1690), 1 work
- Vlieger, Simon de (Rotterdam, 1600 – Weesp, 1653), 1 work
- Vliet, Jan Gillisz. van (Leiden, 1605 – Leiden, 1668), 1 work
- Vois, Ary de (Utrecht, 1641 – Leiden, 1680), 1 work
- Vonck, Elias (Amsterdam, 1605 – Amsterdam, 1652), 1 work
- Weenix, Jan (Amsterdam, 1640 – Amsterdam, 1719), 3 works
- Weenix, Jan Baptist (Amsterdam, 1621 – Utrecht, 1661), 3 works
- Werff, Adriaen van der (Kralingen, 1659 – Rotterdam, 1722), 2 works
- Wijck, Thomas (Beverwijk, 1616 – Haarlem, 1677), 1 work
- Wijnants, Jan (Haarlem, 1632 – Amsterdam, 1684), 1 work
- Willeboirts Bosschaert, Thomas (Bergen op Zoom, 1613 – Antwerp, 1654), 3 works
- Wouwerman, Philips (Haarlem, 1619 – Haarlem, 1668), 11 works
- Wtenbrouck, Moyses van (The Hague, 1590 – The Hague, 1648), 2 works
- Zijl, Gerard Pietersz. van (Haarlem, 1609 – Amsterdam, 1665), 1 work

== Born in the 18th century ==
- Aved, Jacques André Joseph Camellot (Douai, 1702 – Paris, 1766), 1 work
- Baur, Nicolaas (1767 – 1820), 1 work
- Collot, Marie-Anne (Paris, 1748 – Nancy, 1821), 1 work
- Croix, Pierre Frédéric de la (1709 – 1782), 1 work
- Defrance, Léonard (1735 – 1805), 1 work
- Geeraerts, Martinus Josephus (1707 – 1791), 1 work
- Haag, Tethart Philipp Christian (Kassel, 1737 – The Hague, 1812), 1 work
- Hendriks, Wybrand (Amsterdam, 1744 – Haarlem, 1831), 2 works
- Kobell, Hendrik (Rotterdam, 1751 – Rotterdam, 1779), 1 work
- Mijn, Frans van der (Dusseldorp, 1719 – London, 1783), 1 work
- Mijn, George van der (London, 1723 – Amsterdam, 1763), 2 works
- Schweickhardt, Hendrik Willem (1747 – 1797), 1 work
- Tischbein, Anton Wilhelm (1734 – 1804), 1 work
- Tischbein, Johann Friedrich August (Maastricht, 1750 – Heidelberg, 1812), 3 works

== Born in the 19th century ==
- Bakker Korff, Alexander Hugo (The Hague, 1824 – Leiden, 1882), 1 work
- Keller, Johann Heinrich (Zurich, 1692 – The Hague, 1765), 1 work
- Koekkoek, Barend Cornelis (Middelburg, 1803 – Cleve, 1862), 2 works
