= Van Beest =

Van Beest is a Dutch surname. Notable people with the surname include:

- Hidde Van Beest (born 1979), Australian volleyball player
- Sybrand van Beest (c. 1610 – 1674), Dutch painter

== See also ==
- Jacob Eduard van Heemskerck van Beest (1828–1894), Dutch painter
