= Hendrik Wagenvoort =

Dutch classical scholar

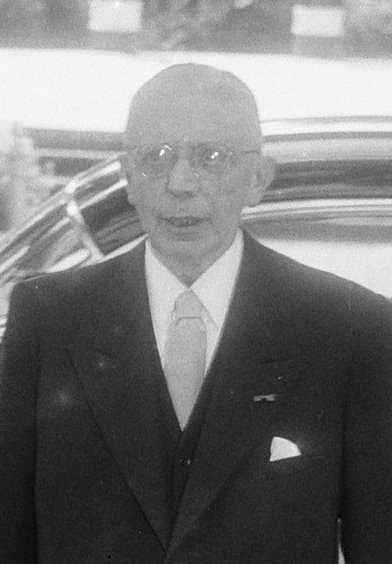
- Born: 23 August 1886; Minnertsga, Netherlands
- Died: 15 January 1976 (aged 89); Utrecht, Netherlands

Academic background
- Education: Utrecht University

Academic work
- Discipline: Classics
- Sub-discipline: Latin Language; Roman Religion
- Institutions: Utrecht University

Hendrik Wagenvoort (23 August 1886 – 15 January 1976) was a Dutch classical scholar. He was professor of Latin at the University of Groningen and Utrecht University and published extensively on subjects relating to the Latin language and Roman religion.

== Biography ==
Wagenvoort was born in Minnertsga on 23 August 1886. He began studying classics at Utrecht University in 1904 and took his doctoral degree in 1911. His dissertation was called De Horatii quae dicuntur Odis Romanis and dealt with Horace's so called Roman Odes. After a year of further studies in Göttingen and Rome he began teaching Latin at gymnasiums, from 1912 to 1919 in Arnhem and from 1919 to 1924 in The Hague. In 1924 he became professor of Latin language and literature at the University of Groningen and during the following years he directed his efforts at examining religion in the late Roman Republic and the early Imperial Rome. He moved to Utrecht in 1930 to succeed Pieter Helbert Damsté (who directed Wagenvoort's doctoral dissertation) as professor of Latin. His inaugural lecture was called Pax Augusta, in line with his earlier research, but gradually his interest shifted to the religion of the earliest Rome and "primitive survivals" in later Roman religious life. In 1956, at age 70, Wagenvoort officially retired but he continued to work at the university and in other contexts.

Wagenvoort was a deacon in the Reformed Church and a member of the Commission of the Unemployed during the economic crisis of the 1930s. He also served as the president of a number of institutions, including the Provincial Society of Utrecht (Provinciaal Utrechts Genootschap) and the Extra-mural University of Utrecht (Utrechtse Volksuniversiteit). Additionally, he served as judge of Hoeufftianum, an annual competition in Latin poetry.

In 1942 Wagenvoort became member of the Royal Netherlands Academy of Arts and Sciences.

== Works and influence ==
Wagenvoort was influential both as a writer and as a teacher. He published a great number of articles but also directed 38 doctoral dissertations (2 in Groningen and 36 in Utrecht), an unusually high amount in the field of classical studies.

=== Publications in English ===
- 1947 Roman dynamism: studies in ancient Roman thought, language and custom
- 1956 Studies in Roman literature, culture, and religion (a collection of some of Wagenvoorts own papers, presented to him on his 70th birthday)
- 1980 Pietas: selected studies in Roman religion (posthumously)
