= Maerten Boelema de Stomme =

Dutch painter

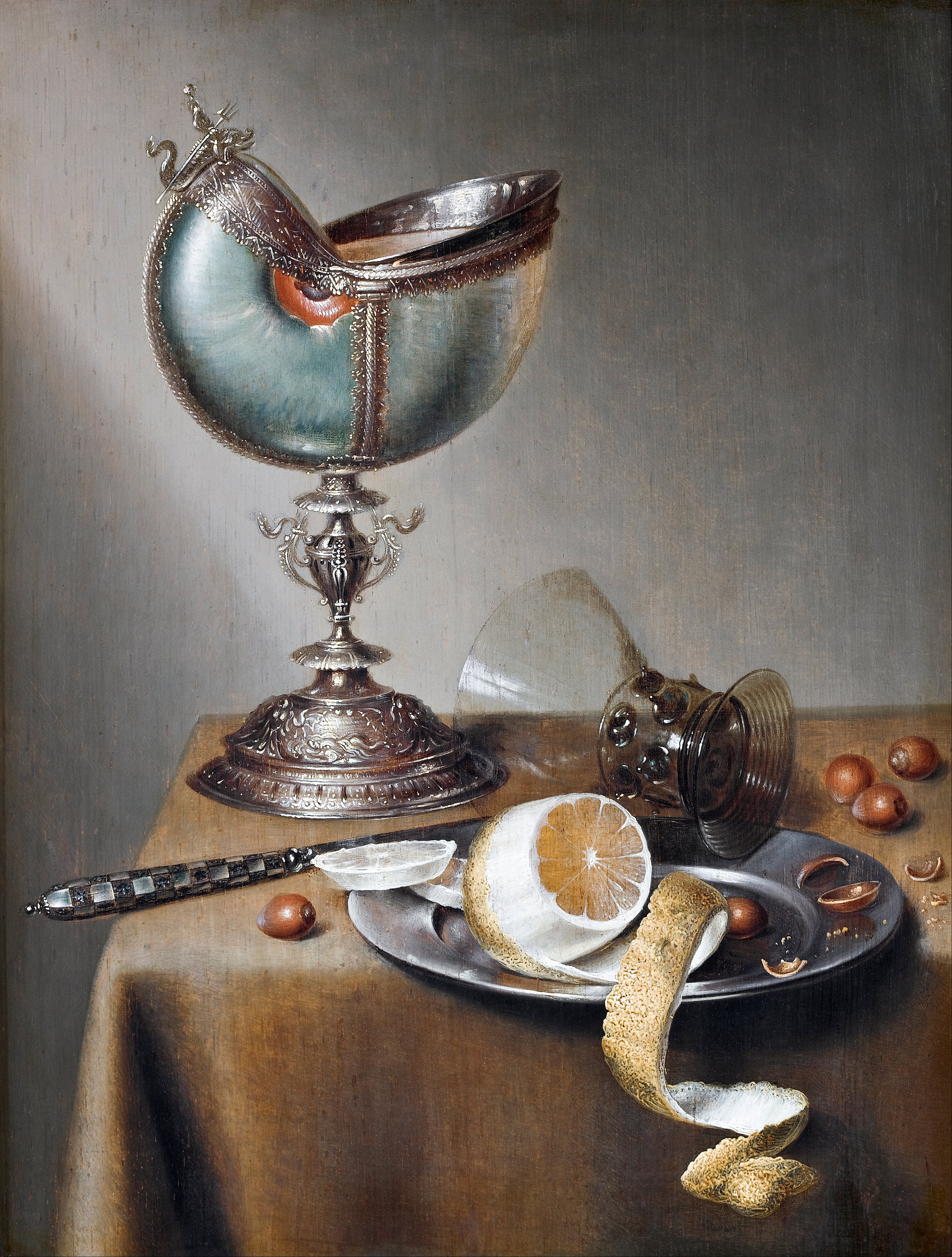
Still-Life with Nautilus Cup. Hallwyl Museum, Stockholm.

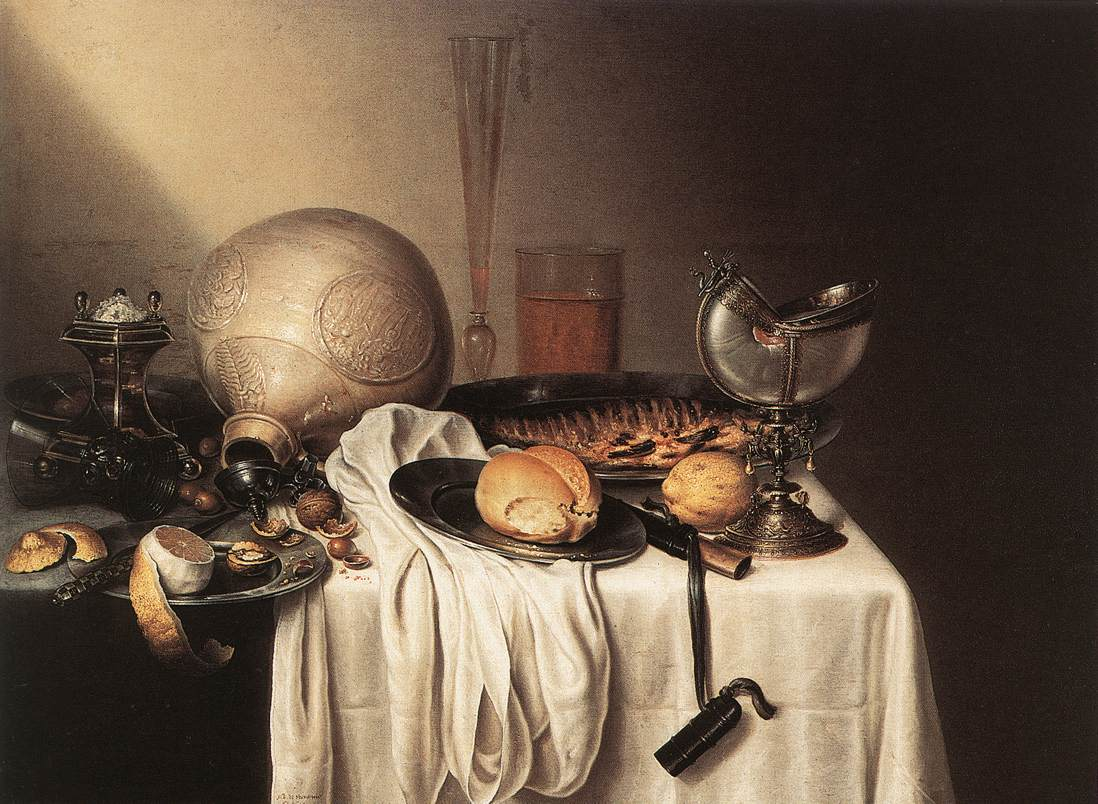
Still life with a "Bearded Man" crock and a nautilus shell cup

Maerten Boelema de Stomme (1611 in Leeuwarden – after 1644 in Haarlem), was a Dutch Golden Age painter.

== Biography ==
According to the RKD he was a pupil of Willem Claesz Heda in 1642 and signed his works 'M.B. de Stomme'. Dated works are known from the short period 1642-1644. Boelema called himself "de Stomme" as he was mute. He specialized in stilllifes with so called Roemer glasses filled with white wine, nuts, knives decorated with mother of pearl, half peeled lemons, wine leaves and silver plates. These often stand directly on a stone board or on a heavy green or rosa tablecloth decorated with gold fringes.
