= Master of the Brandon Portrait =

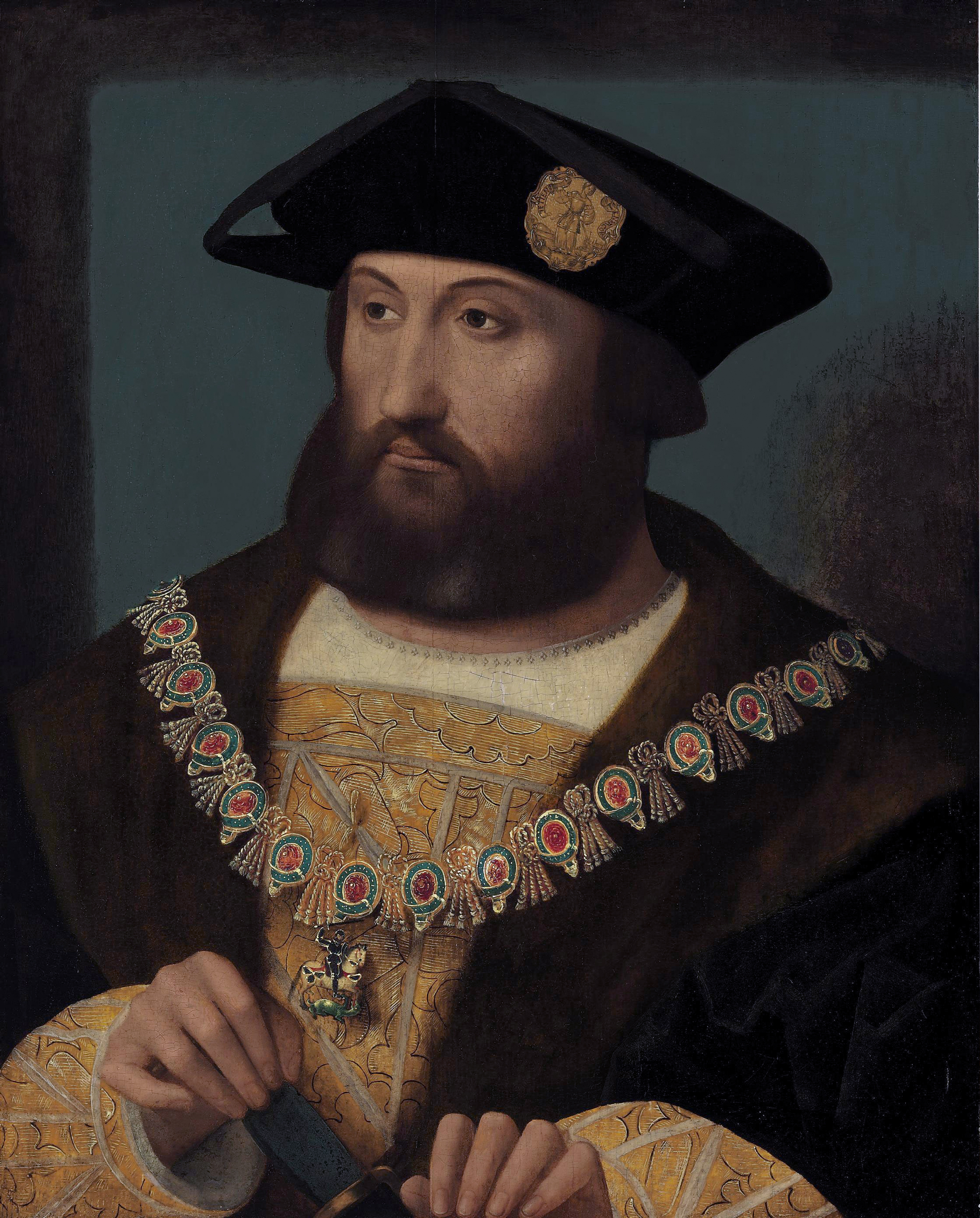
Portrait of Charles Brandon, circa 1510–1530 (private collection)

The Master of the Brandon Portrait or Portraits was an Early Netherlandish painter active about 1510–1530 in Bruges and at the court of Henry VIII in England. His notname is based on the Portrait of Charles Brandon, Earl of Suffolk now in a private collection. He may be the same person as Joannes Corvus.

Probably a follower of Gerard David, his style is reminiscent of that of Adriaen Isenbrandt.

== Brandon portrait ==
Long thought to be a depiction of Edward Stafford, 3rd Duke of Buckingham by Hans Holbein the Younger and exhibited as such several times in the Victorian times, in the 1930s the painting was finally identified as a portrait of Charles Brandon, 1st Duke of Suffolk, a Tudor politician and Henry VIII's personal friend.

== Other works ==
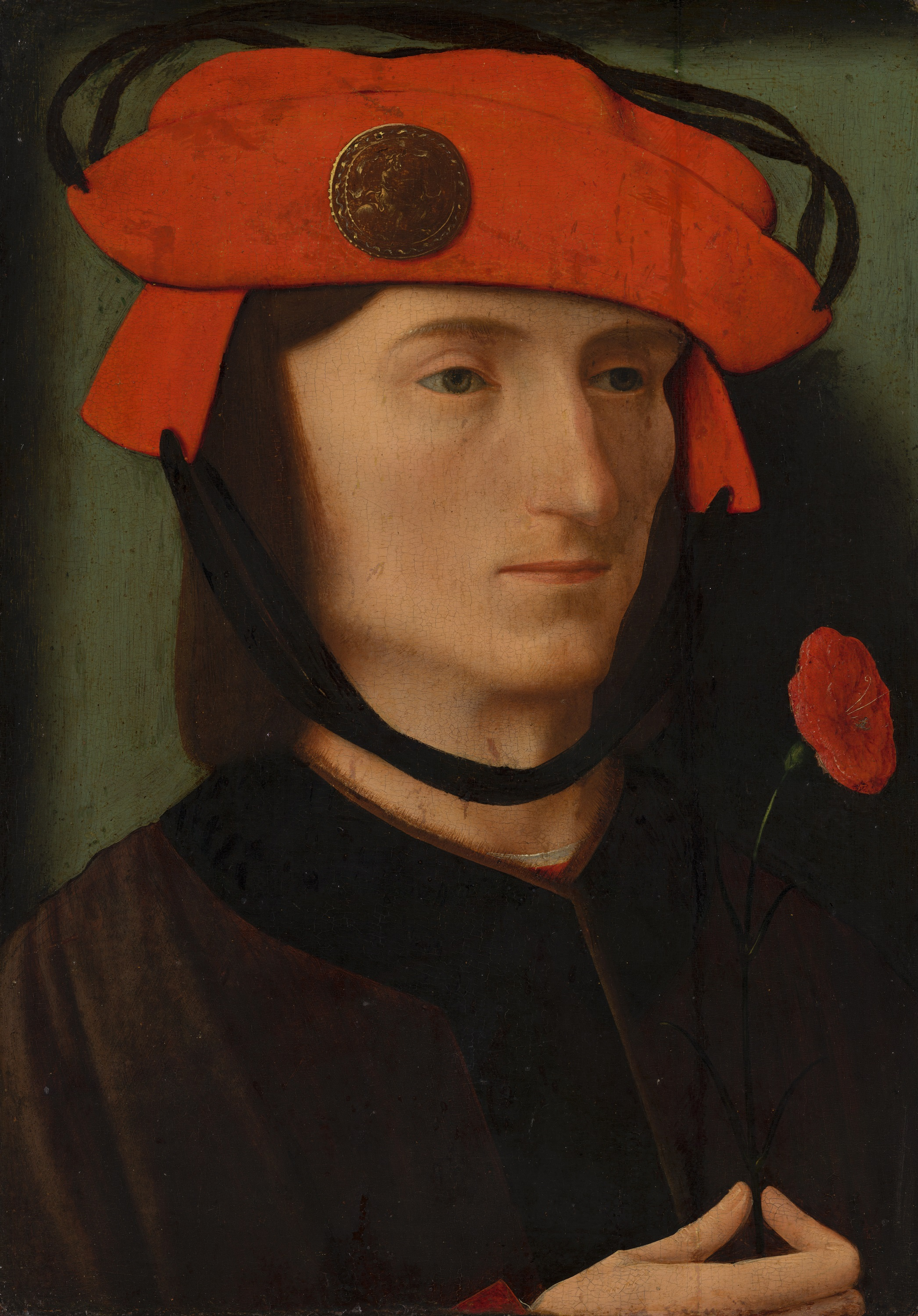
Portrait of a Man with a Samson Medal, or Portrait of a Man with a Pink, Mauritshuis, The Hague, inv. 752
(attribution disputed)
