= Jan Olis =

Dutch painter (1610–1676)

- Born: Gorinchem, Netherlands
- Died: Heusden, Netherlands
- Occupation: Painter

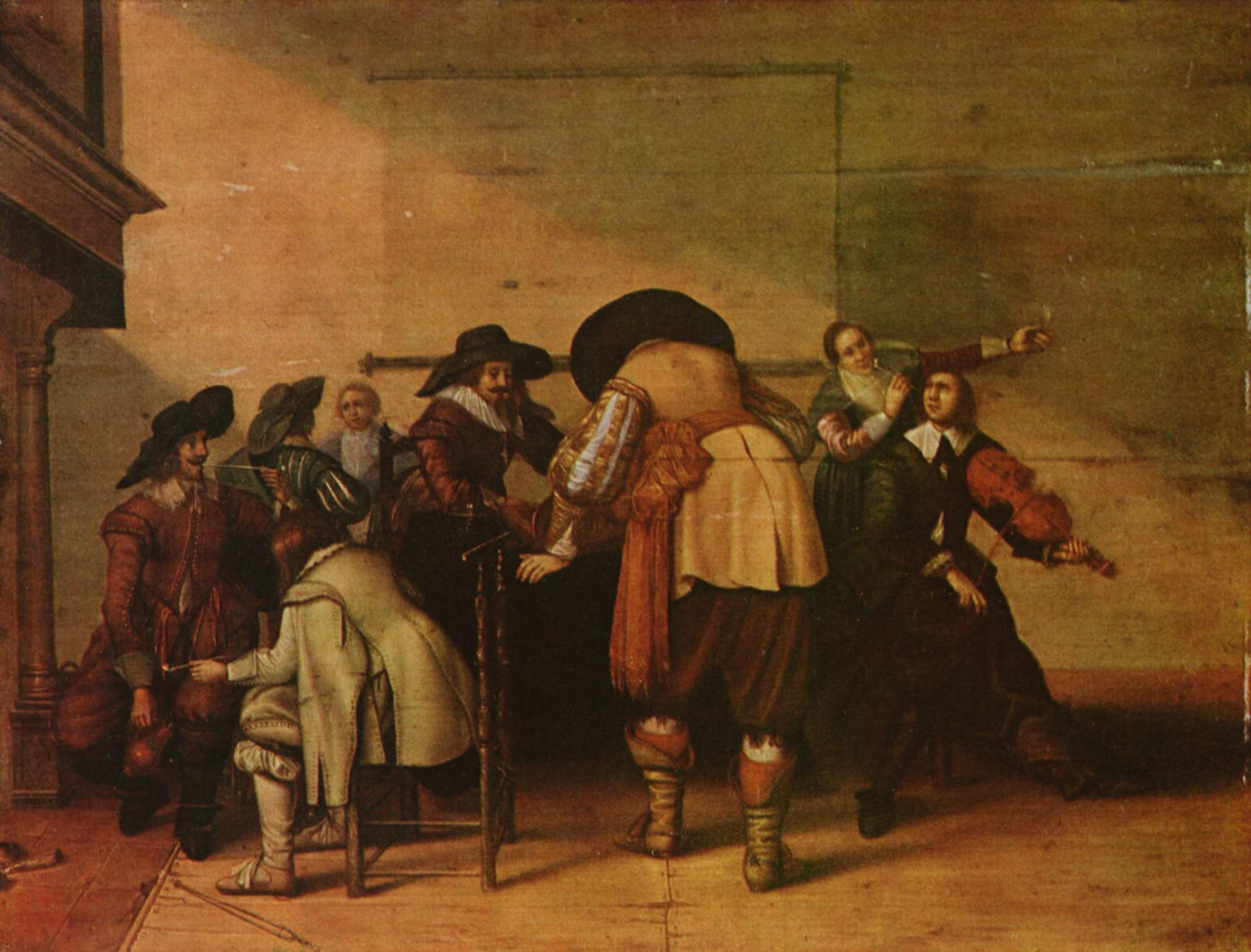
A merry company

Jan Olis (1610–1676) was a Dutch Golden Age painter.

Olis was born in Gorinchem, Netherlands. According to the RKD in 1632, he became a member of the Dordrecht Guild of St. Luke. In 1637, he got married, and during the years 1632–43, he is registered both as a wine seller and a teacher in the guild. He is possibly the same person as Jan Olofsen, who became a member of the Confrerie Pictura in The Hague in 1643. He then moved to Heusden in 1651, where he had various positions in the council until he became a mayor there in 1657 and was tax collector in 1670. He is known for farm scenes, genre works, and merry companies and influenced the painter Mathieu Lenain. He died in Heusden.
