= Gerret Willemsz. Heda =

Dutch Golden Age painter

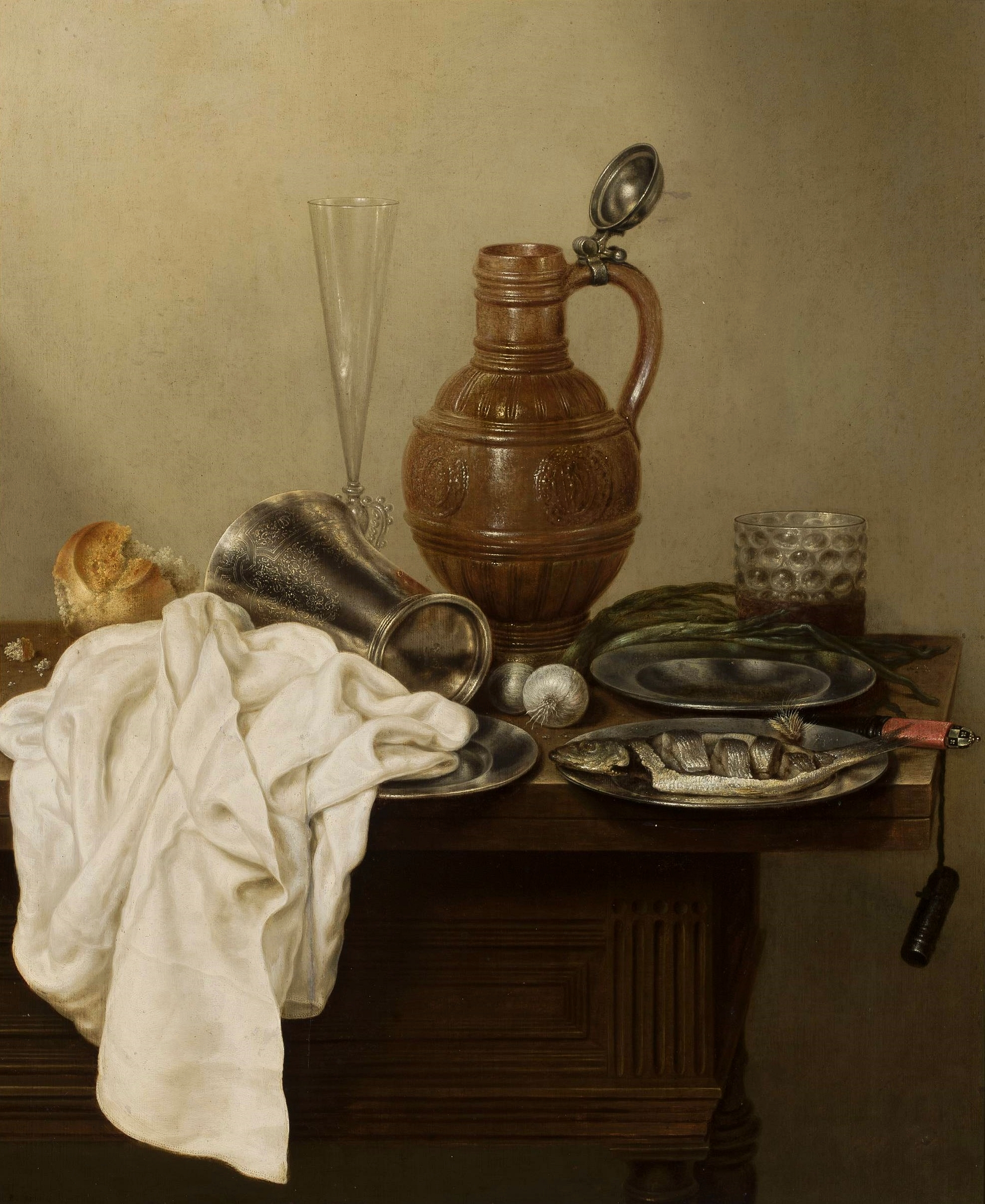
Still life with jug

Gerret Willemsz. Heda (1620/25, in Haarlem – 1647/59, in Haarlem), was a Dutch Golden Age painter; known for fruit still lifes and vanitas paintings.

He was the son and pupil of Willem Claesz. Heda, and influenced the still life painter Jan Jansz. Treck.
