= Jacobus Mancadan =

Dutch Golden Age painter

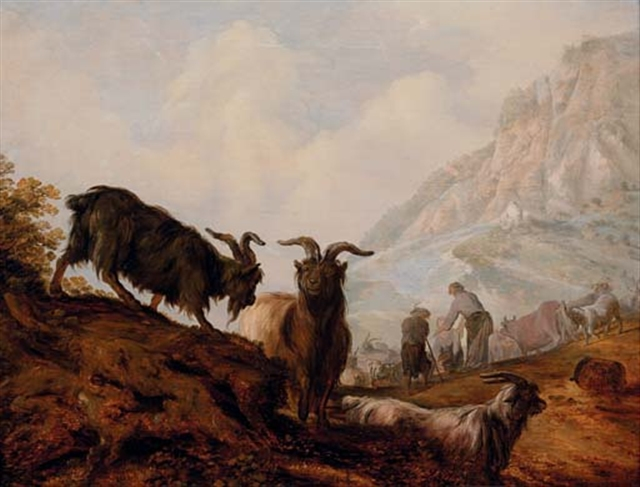
Peasants and goats in a mountainous landscape. Oil on panel, 15.6 x 20.7 in. / 39.6 x 52.6 cm. Undated

Jacobus Sibrandi Mancadan (c. 1602 – 4 October 1680) was a Dutch Golden Age painter mostly known for his pastoral landscapes.

== Biography ==
Mancadan was born in Minnertsga and is considered one of the most important Frisian landscape painters of the Dutch Golden Age. His landscapes were either idealized in the Italian manner or more naturalistic and depicting recognizable features of his native Friesland region. The Italianate landscapes seem to be influenced by the work of Salvator Rosa but also by Haarlem painters, such as Jan van Goyen and Salomon van Ruysdael.

Mancadan also served as a government official and apparently did not begin painting until midway through his life. According to the RKD, he lived in Franeker from 1634 to 1644, where he also served as mayor. In 1658, he became involved in peatwinning in the southeast of Friesland and was one of initiators of the canal dug to Bakkeveen. He settled down in Siegerswoude. After his wife died, he moved to Beetsterzwaag, where his daughter lived. He died in Tjerkgaast, where his son, who had a bad reputation, was a minister.
