= Willem Claesz. Heda =

Dutch Golden Age painter of still-lifes

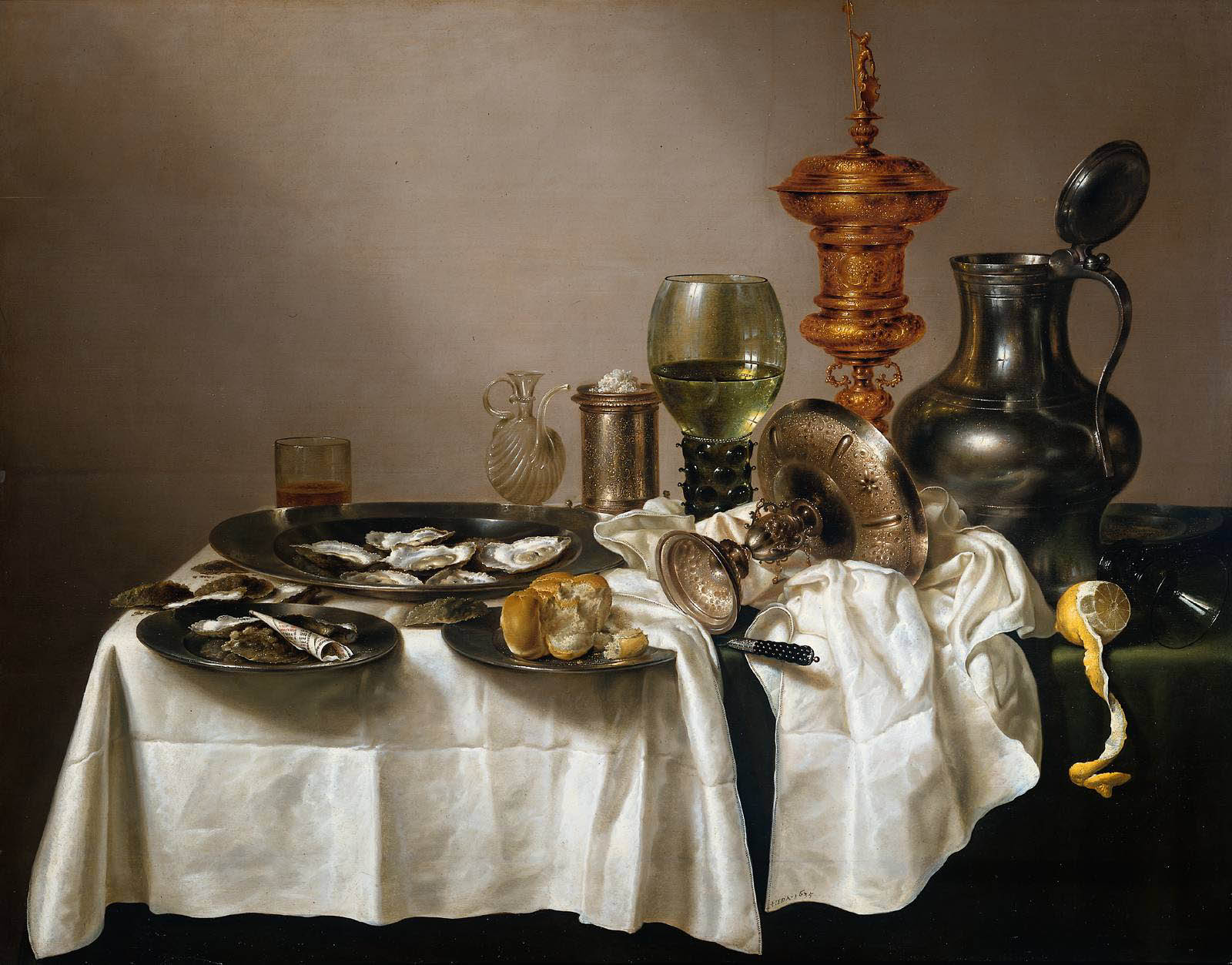
Still-life with a gilt cup, 1635, Rijksmuseum, Amsterdam

Willem Claeszoon Heda (December 14, 1593/1594 – c. 1680/1682) was a Dutch Golden Age painter from the city of Haarlem devoted exclusively to the painting of still life. He is known for his innovation of the late breakfast genre of still life painting.

== Early life ==
Heda was born in Haarlem, Netherlands, the son of the Haarlem city architect Claes Pietersz. His mother Anna Claesdr was a member of the Heda family. His uncle was the painter Cornelis Claesz Heda. Heda's early life is all but unknown, with no surviving pieces dated to that period. Judging from his date of birth, scholars have speculated that Heda began painting around 1615.

His earliest known work was a Vanitas which fit the monochromatic and skillful texturing of his later pieces, but portrayed a subject matter distinct from the depictions of more sumptuous objects in his later years. This Vanitas, and the two other breakfast pieces by Heda in the 1620s were known for their clear deviation from earlier breakfast-pieces. The objects in these works demonstrate greater special effect and maintain a sense of balance for the viewer despite the uneven and diagonal grouping of objects. Additionally, these works adopted the monochromatic style contrary to early breakfast-pieces.

Heda's skill was recognized early on in his career by other notable figures in Haarlem, such as Samuel Ampzing, a Dutch minister and poet from Haarlem, who captured the city in poetry. Heda won enough local fame in his own day for Ampzing to praise him in the same breath with Salomon de Bray and Pieter Claesz in his 1628 Beschryvinge ende lof der stad Haerlem in Holland. "[I] ha[ve] to praise Heda with the banquet pieces of Solomon de bray and Pieter Claesz, their skill deserves to be mentioned in his poem."

Following his support from Samuel Ampzing, Heda became a member of the Haarlem Guild of St. Luke. As evidenced by his signing of a new charter to regularize the affairs of the guild on May 22, 1631, Heda was an active member of the Haarlem Guild of St. Luke.

== Maturity ==
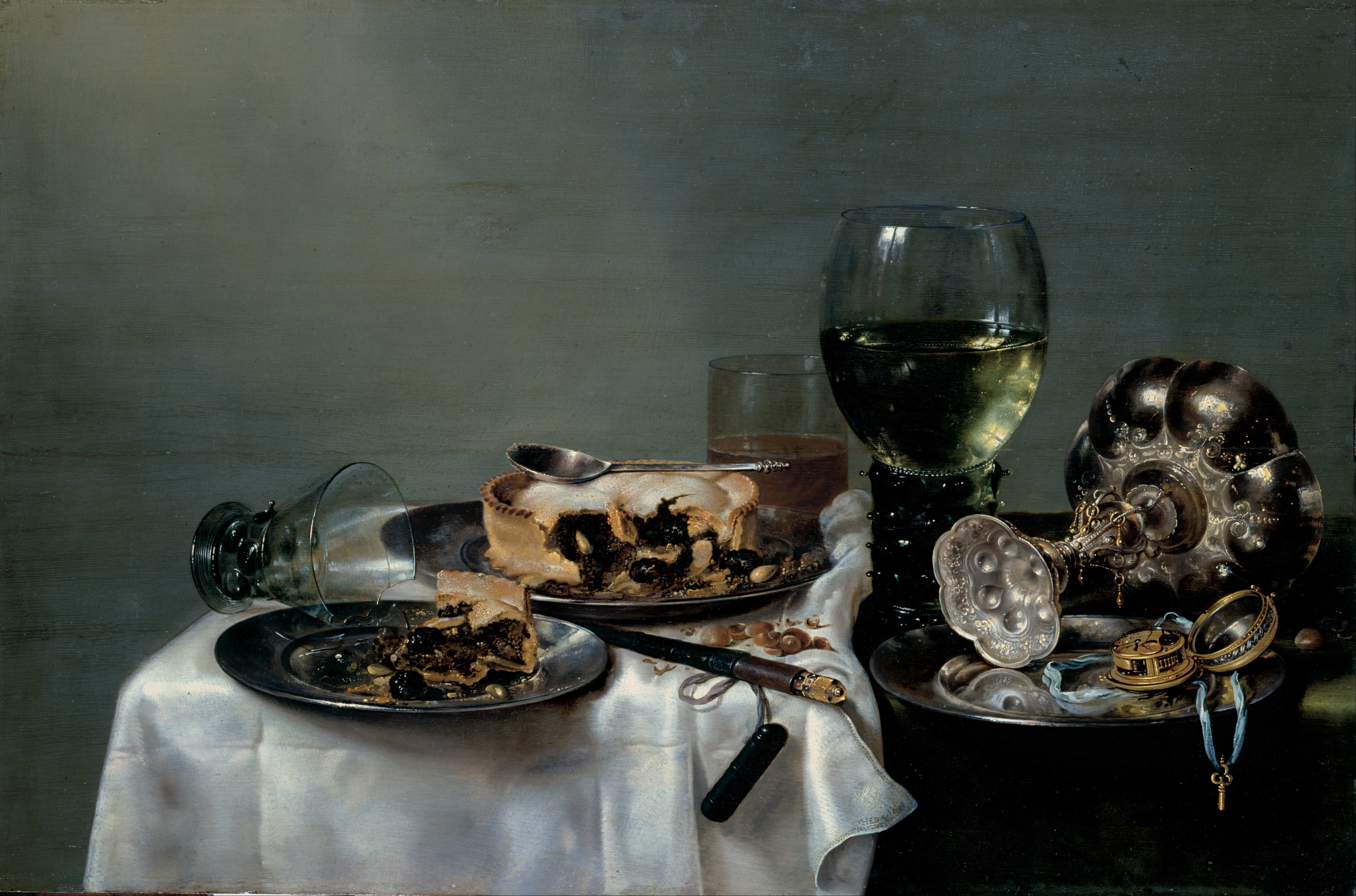
Breakfast table with blackberry pie, 1631, Gemäldegalerie Alte Meister, Dresden

Following his formative pieces of the 1620s, Heda reached his artistic maturity in the 1630s with pieces such as his 1631 still-life Breakfast table with blackberry pie and those of the "1639 group" sold to Vienna in the 1930s. These pieces contain perfectly draped fabric and assortments of fine glass and metal wares in addition to orderly-presented foodstuffs. This set of paintings is characterized by a sublime simplicity and order that few artists of his genre ever obtained. His coloration and illustration of light in the pieces, combined with fine additive brush strokes, results in an almost unbelievable level of realism.

Heda's style continued to progress with his pieces of the 1640s developing a great simplicity founded upon a "firm construction built up on broad lines." In this time, he also began to incorporate the crinkled napkin and knocked-over vases to his set of objects. This new set of objects presented a challenge to the artist to maintain cohesion and order in a clearly disordered environment. Though remnants of his more intimate pieces remained in this period, Heda began to add more objects to his works, experimenting with modified compositional styles.

The 1650s saw the introduction of a wider color-scheme. This change brought more fruit and curled leaves to his works, which combined with the crinkled napkins of the previous decade, resulted in a less firm character (in contrast to the glass and metal textures that he was previously known for).

== Final years ==
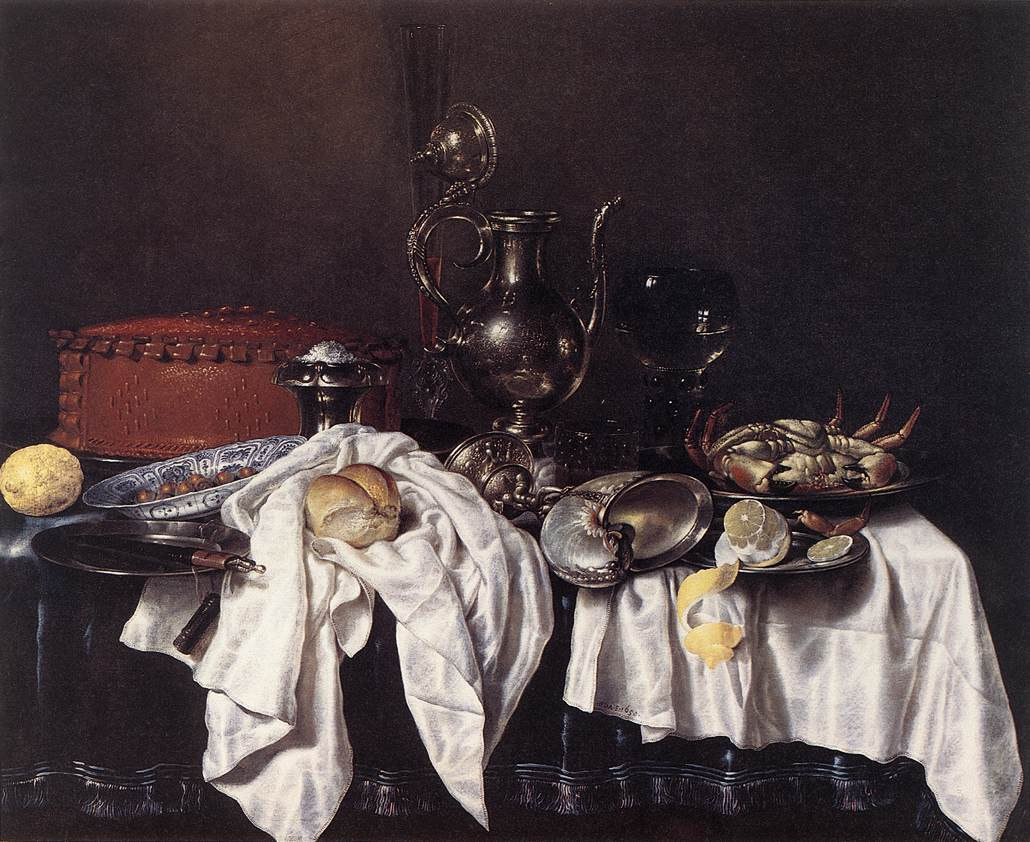
Still Life with Pie, Silver Ewer and Crab, 1658, Frans Halsmuseum, Haarlem

Heda's final years saw the artist begin the transition from the late breakfast still-life paintings he helped create, to the pronk, or display, still-life pieces of Willem Kalf in Amsterdam. His last known works were painted in 1664 (Private collection, The Hague) and 1665 (Museum del Monte, Brussels), and contained the warmer pallette of browns associated with Kalf's pieces.

Though he lived until the 1680s, Heda's last known paintings were created in the 1660s. Heda died in Haarlem in 1680 or 1682.

== Works ==
Willem was a contemporary and comrade of Dirck Hals, akin to him in pictorial touch and technical execution. But Heda was more careful and finished than Hals, showing considerable skill and taste in the arrangement and colouring of his chased cups, beakers and tankards of both precious and inferior metals. Heda was also associated with the Haarlem artist and fellow still life painter, Floris van Dyck. In his work, Harlemias, the Dutch poet Theodorus Schrevelius acknowledged exceptional skill at his genre of painting. Heda and his contemporary and fellow still life painter, Floris van Dyck, were "held in high esteem by the community as the best at painting their genre."

As a painter of "ontbijt" or breakfast pieces, he is often compared to his contemporary Pieter Claesz.

== Popularity ==
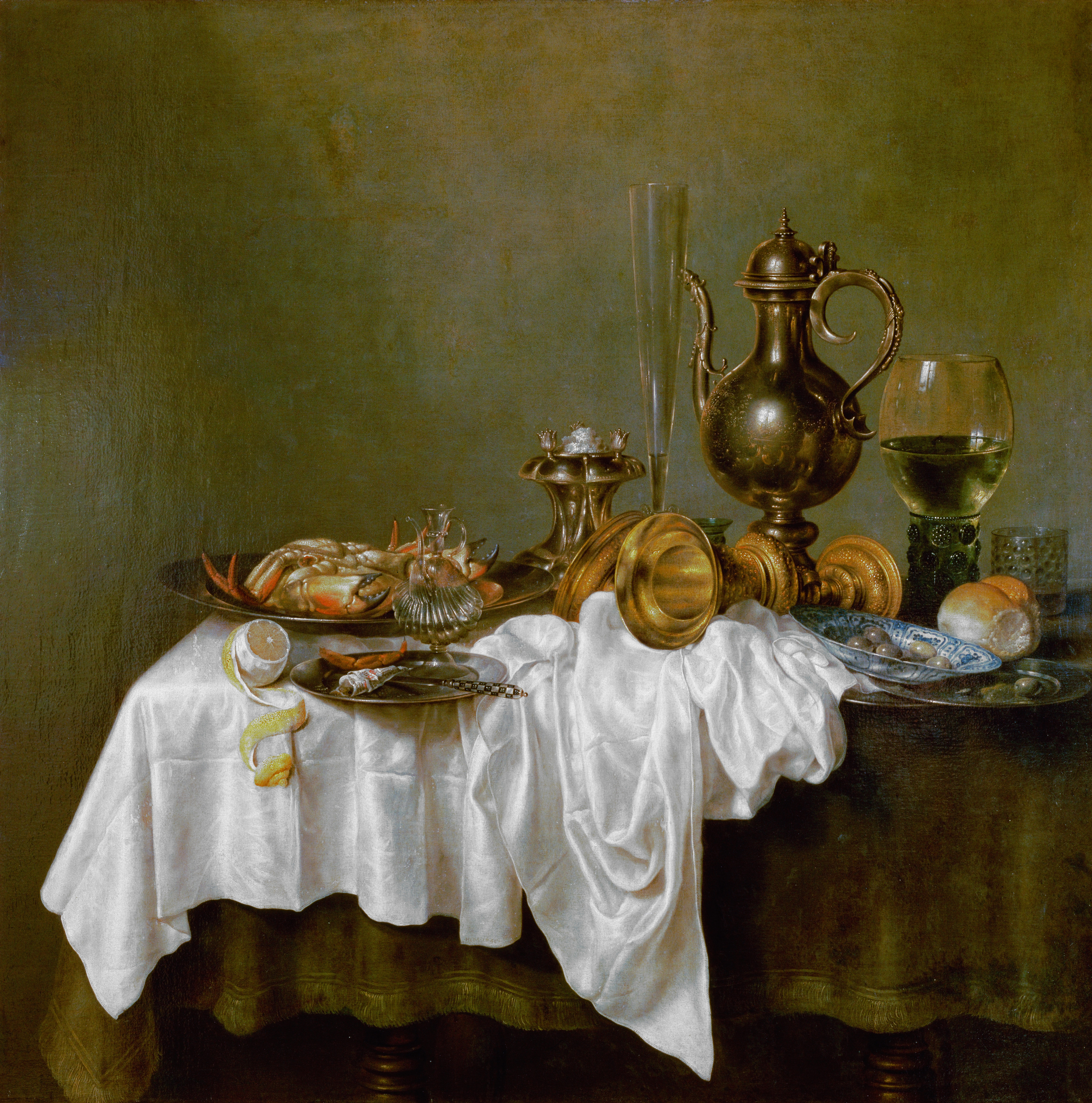
Breakfast, Hermitage Museum, 1648, Saint Petersburg.

Willem Claesz Heda's skill was recognized in his own time by Samuel Ampzing, the Haarlem Guild of St. Luke, and Theodorus Schrevelius. Though Heda would clearly not be included in Het schilder-boeck of Karel van Mander, as its 1604 publishing fell before his rise to prominence, it would be expected that he would be included in the work of the next great Dutch art biographer Arnold Houbraken. Houbraken briefly mentioned Heda in the third volume of his work based on the biography by Schrevelius. Houbraken's paltry inclusion of Heda in his Groote Schouburgh was probably due to nothing more than the lack of information about the artist. Houbraken's antiquarian approach to artists' biographies meant that he published all of the information he had on each individual, and had he seen one of Heda's pieces, he would have likely written more.

Houbraken's scant mention of Heda was reflected in the works of his followers, Johan van Gool and Jacob Campo Weyerman. Neither of these individuals included Heda in their respective books.

As a result of the decline of Dutch art after the Dutch Golden Age, many countries began to ignore Dutch artworks. Jean-Baptiste Descamps a French artist who briefly studied in Antwerp became the first among modern art writers outside of the Netherlands to acknowledge the nation's artistic importance. Although Descamps' writings included many inaccuracies, he described the Dutch masters, the van Eyck brothers among others, with personal observations that set him apart from many who ignored this genre. Following Descamps, Antoine-Nicolas Dezallier d'Argenville, a French writer and art connoisseur, cemented the shift in attitudes about the Dutch low genres. D'Argenville support for their unique style of genre painting. D'Argenville was in favor of treating all styles equally and believed that the preeminent artists of all fields should be valued for their skill over their subject matter. After attitudes towards genre paintings were changed, and Dutch art was once again in vogue, Willem Claesz Heda returned to prominence in the art world.

Heda was rediscovered by the French art critic Théophile Thoré in the 1860s. After seeing an example of his work at the Boijmans Museum in Rotterdam, Thoré praised Heda's ability to make "petite nature into a splendid celebration of life."

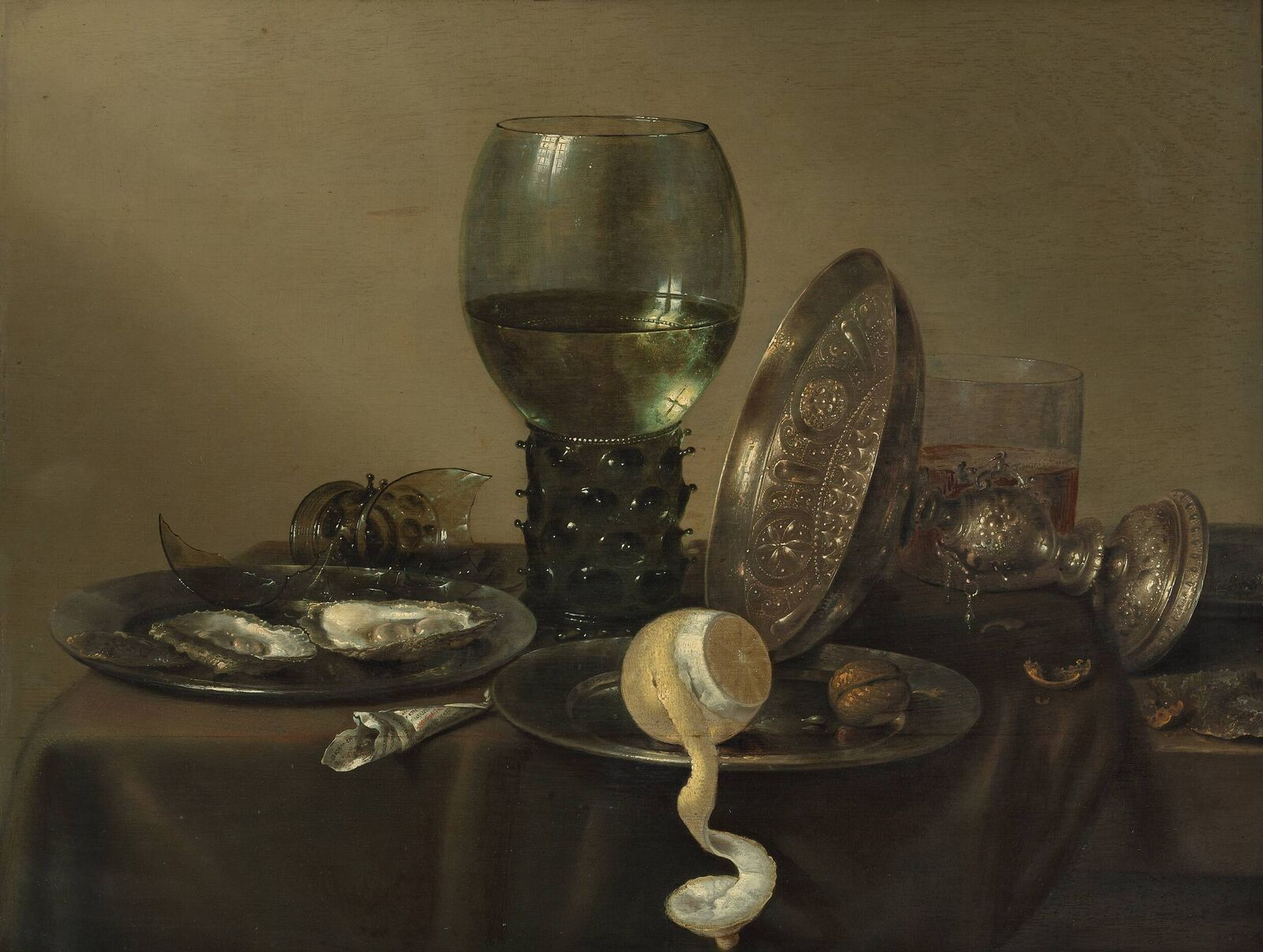
Still Life with Gilt Goblet, 1635, Museum Boijmans Van Beuningen, Rotterdam

== Legacy ==
Heda died in his native city of Haarlem in 1680 or 1682. Heda's renewed popularity in the latter half of the 19th century resulted in the dissemination of his pieces throughout the world. His works can now be found on display in some of the world's most famous museums: the Rijksmuseum, Amsterdam; the Metropolitan Museum of Art, New York; the Louvre, Paris; the National Gallery, London; the National Gallery of Art, Washington, D.C.; the Kunsthistorisches Museum, Vienna; the Hermitage Museum, Saint Petersburg; the Prado Museum and the Thyssen-Bornemisza Museum, Madrid.

As one of the most recognized Dutch masters and one of the signature artists of the still life genre, his paintings feature in general surveys of art history as some of the highlights of Dutch seventeenth-century painting. His pupils include Maerten Boelema de Stomme, Gerret Willemsz Heda, Hendrik Heerschop, and Arnold van Beresteijn.
