= Hendrik Heerschop =

Dutch Golden Age painter (1626–1690)

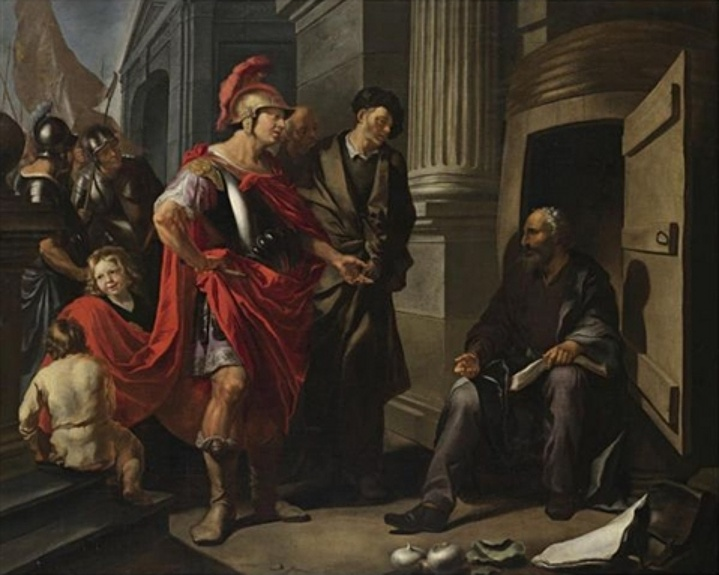
Diogenes and Alexander, 1661

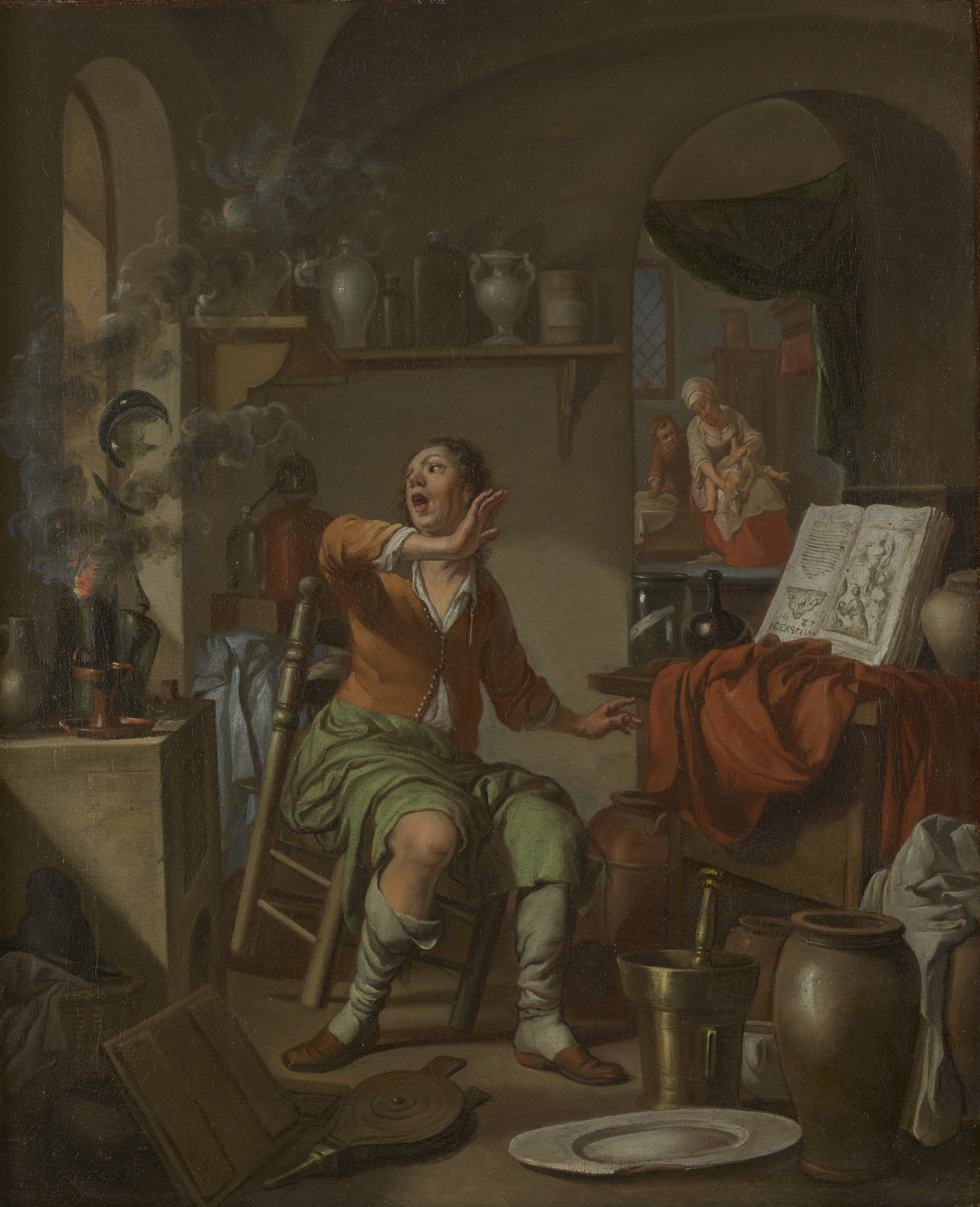
The Alchemist's Experiment Takes Fire, 1687, Chemical Heritage Foundation

Hendrik Heerschop (1626, Haarlem – 1690, Haarlem), was a Dutch Golden Age painter.

== Biography ==
Hendrick was a son of the Haarlem tailor, Harmen Jansz. and his second wife, Jopje Jansdr. van Kuyndert (from Kuinre, Overijssel). The family was possibly Mennonist; Hendrick married to Janneke Jansdr. van Kuyndert on November 20, 1650.

According to Houbraken, he was a painter of conversation pieces.

According to the RKD, he was a pupil of Willem Claesz Heda. And he was most likely also a pupil of Rembrandt.
