= Minnertsga =

Minnertsga Minnertsgea (West Frisian)
- Village
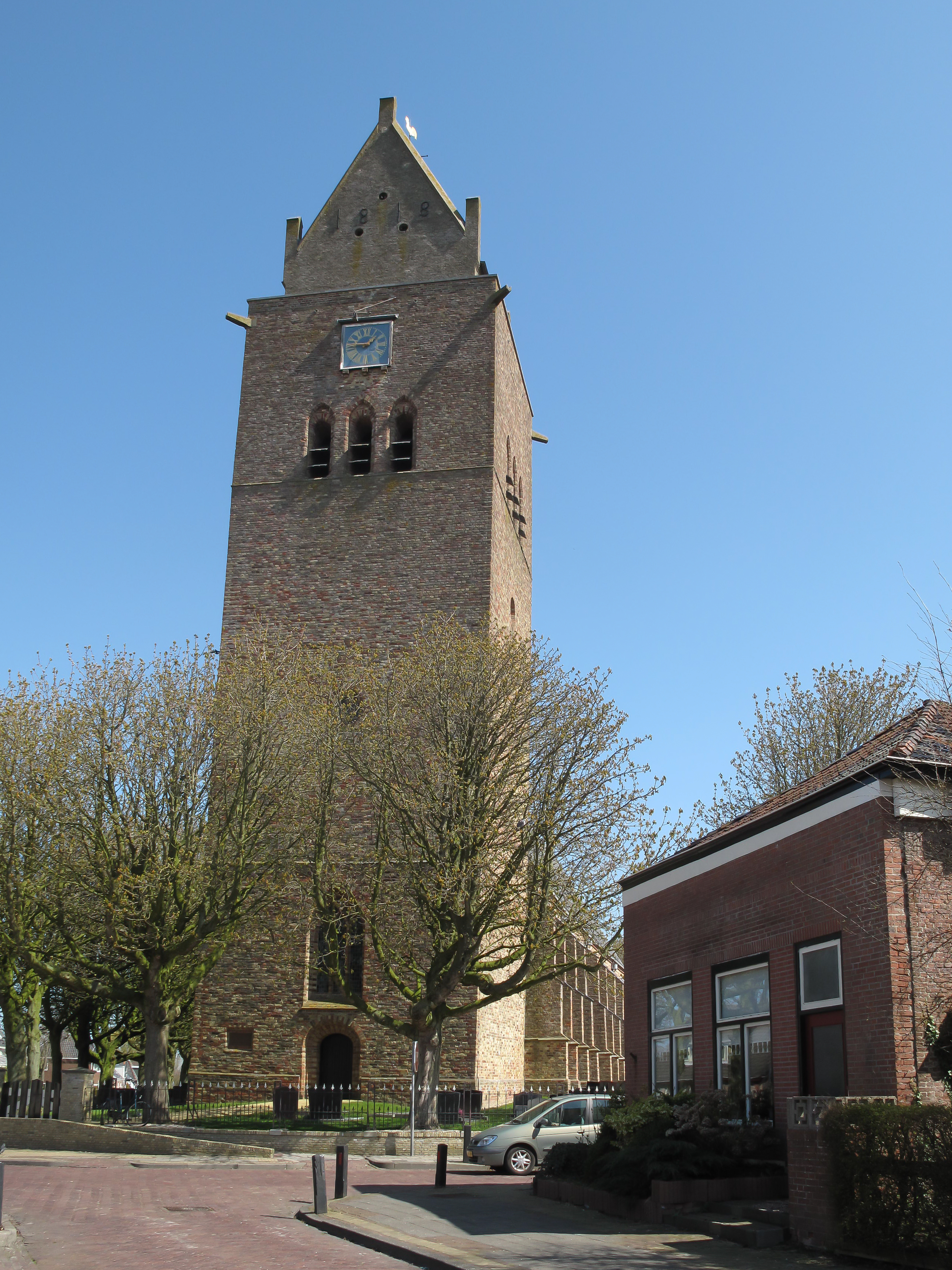
- The church in Minnertsga

- Flag Coat of arms

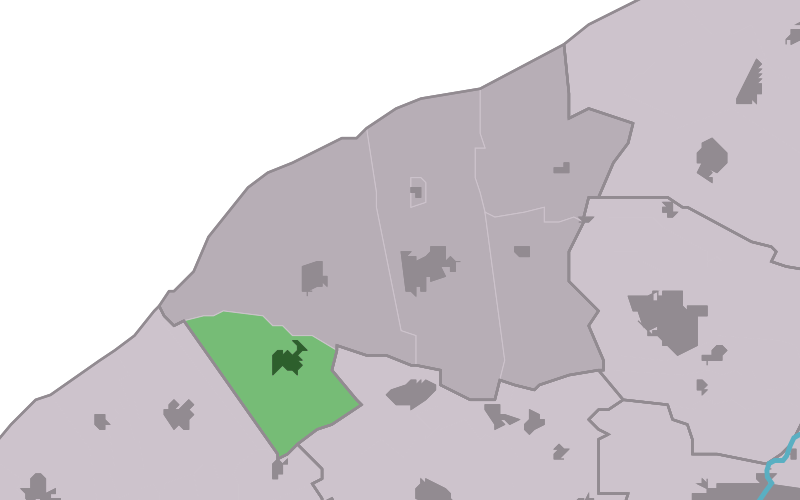
- Location in het Bildt municipality

- Location in the Netherlands Minnertsga (Netherlands)
- Country: Netherlands
- Province: Friesland
- Municipality: Waadhoeke

Area
  - Total: 12.03 km^{2} (4.64 sq mi)
- Elevation: 0.9 m (3.0 ft)

Population (2021)
  - Total: 1,740
  - Density: 145/km^{2} (375/sq mi)
- Time zone: UTC+1 (CET)
  - Summer (DST): UTC+2 (CEST)
- Postal code: 9047
- Dialing code: 0518

Minnertsga (Dutch: [ˈmɪnərtsxaː]; West Frisian: Minnertsgea [ˈmɪnətsˌɡɪə]) is a village in Waadhoeke municipality in the province of Friesland, the Netherlands. It had a population of around 1,750 in January 2017. Before 2018, the village was part of het Bildt municipality.

== History ==
The village was first mentioned in the 13th century as Menerdkerke. It means "settlement of Meinard (person)". The name changed from kerk (church) to -ga (settlement) in the late-14th century. Minnertsga is a terp (artificial living hill) village from the 8th century.

The Dutch Reformed church, built in the 16th century, features 13th-century elements. The tower dates from 1505 and was given a new roof in 1818. The church was damaged by fire in 1947 and subsequently restored between 1951 and 1955. In 1940, the Galileërkerk in Leeuwarden was demolished, and some of the headstones have been moved to Minnertsga.

In 1840, Minnersga was home to 1,140 people. A railway station existed in Minnersga between 1902 and 1940. 85% of Minnersga's residents are members of the local interest group.

== Notable people ==
- Jacobus Mancadan (c. 1602–1680), painter and former grietman (mayor/judge)
- Hendrik Wagenvoort (1886–1976), professor in Latin language and Roman religion

== Gallery ==
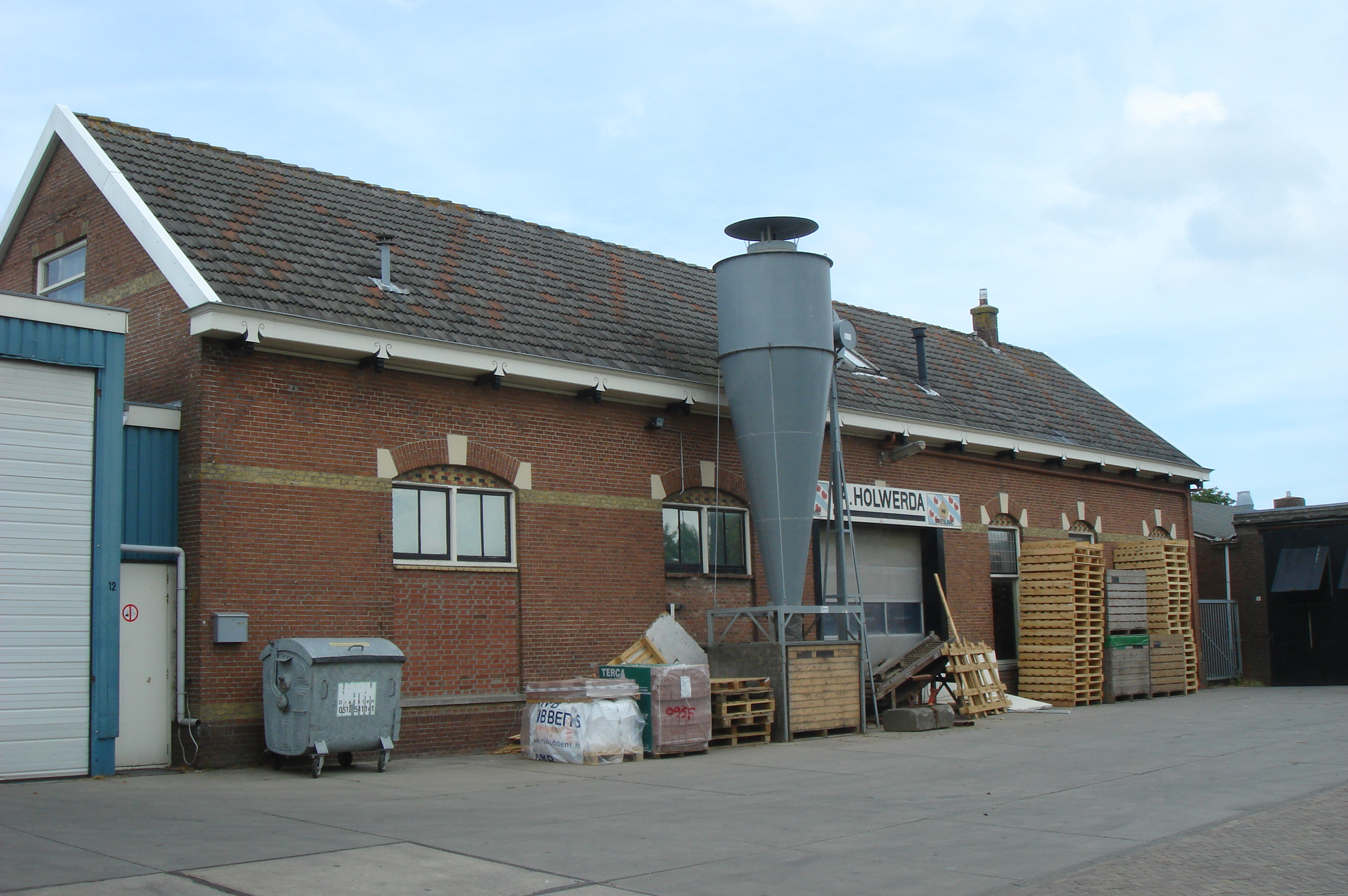
Former train station

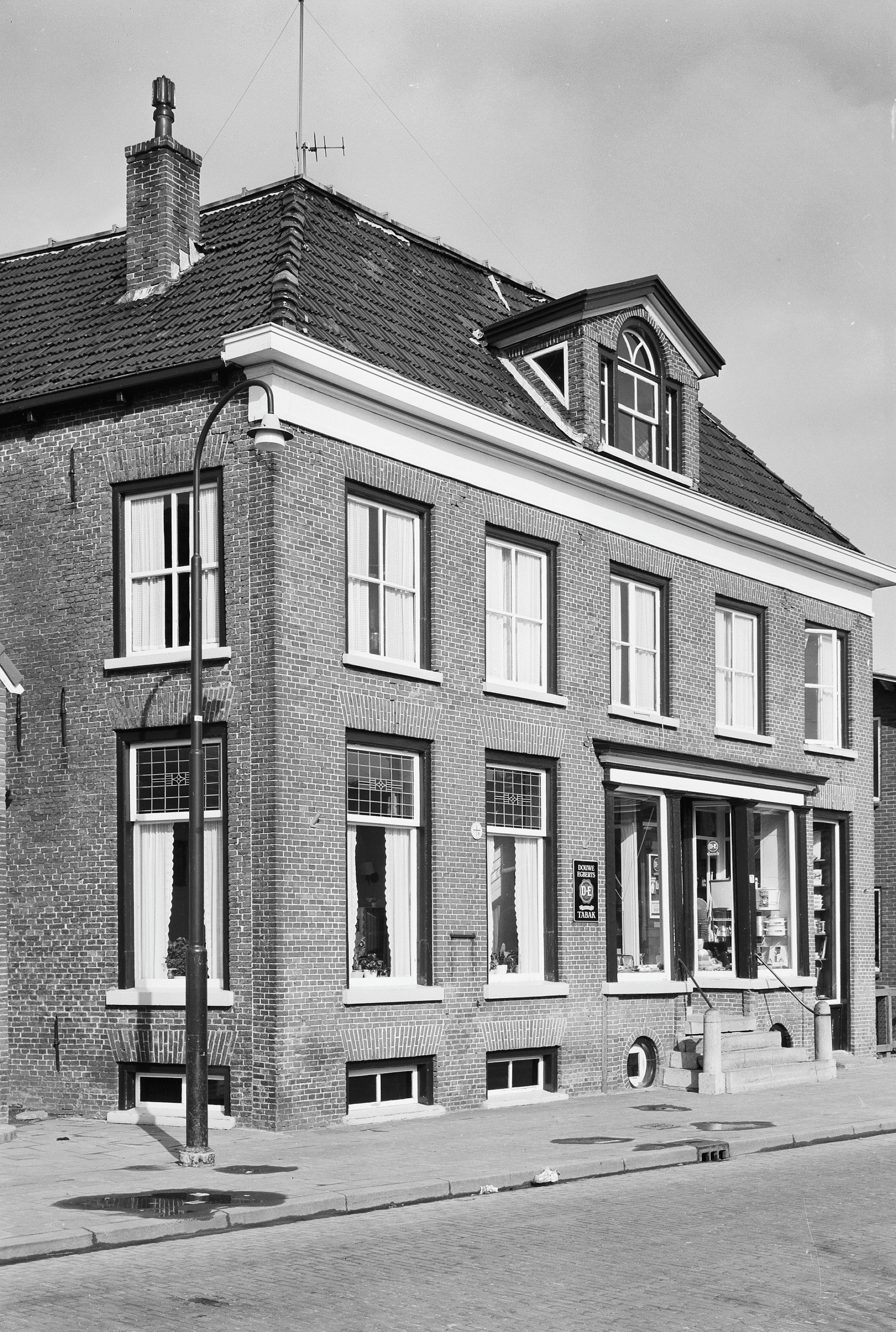
House in Minnertsga (1968)

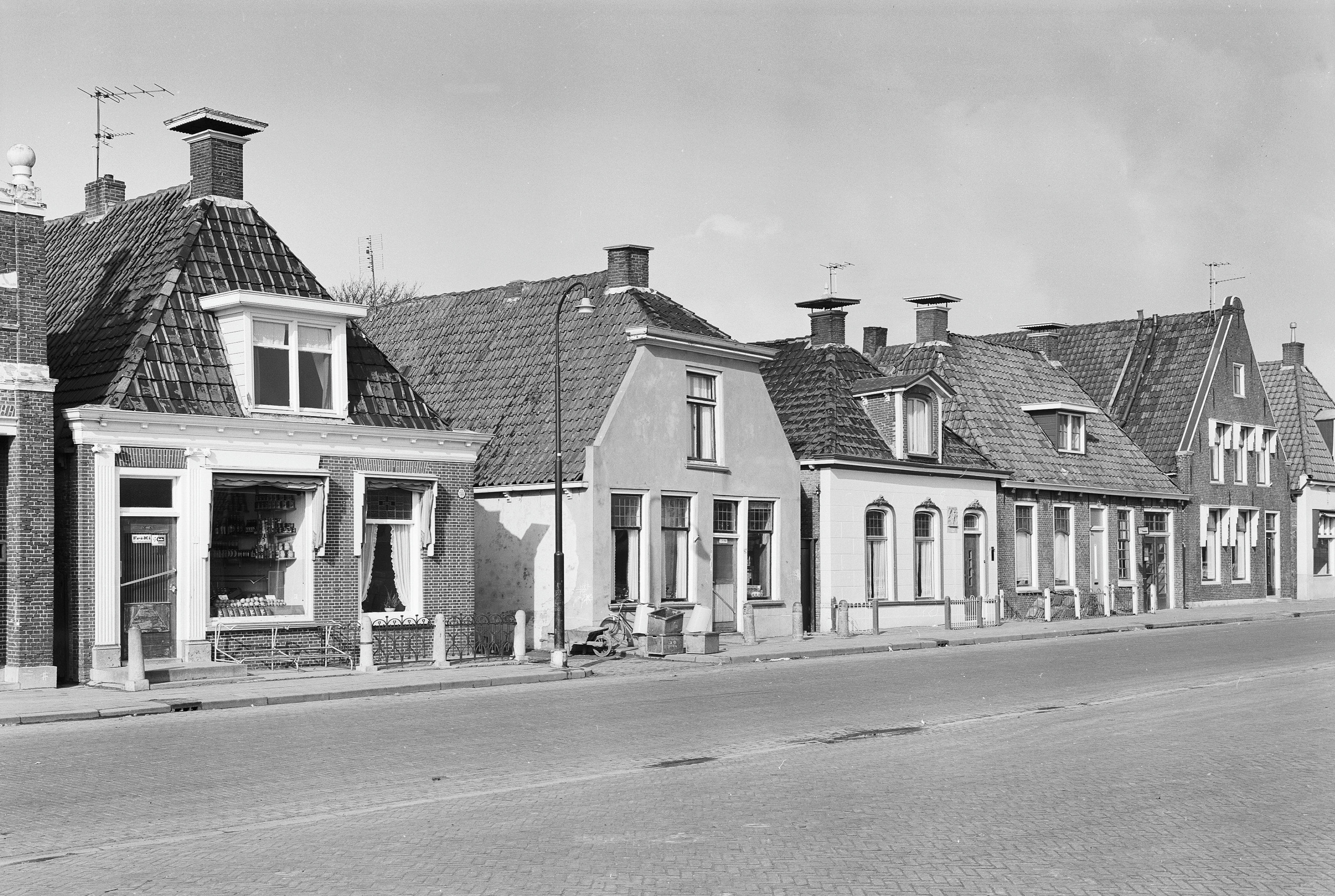
Street view (1968)
