= Adriaen Isenbrandt =

Early Netherlandish painter (c. 1485 – 1551)

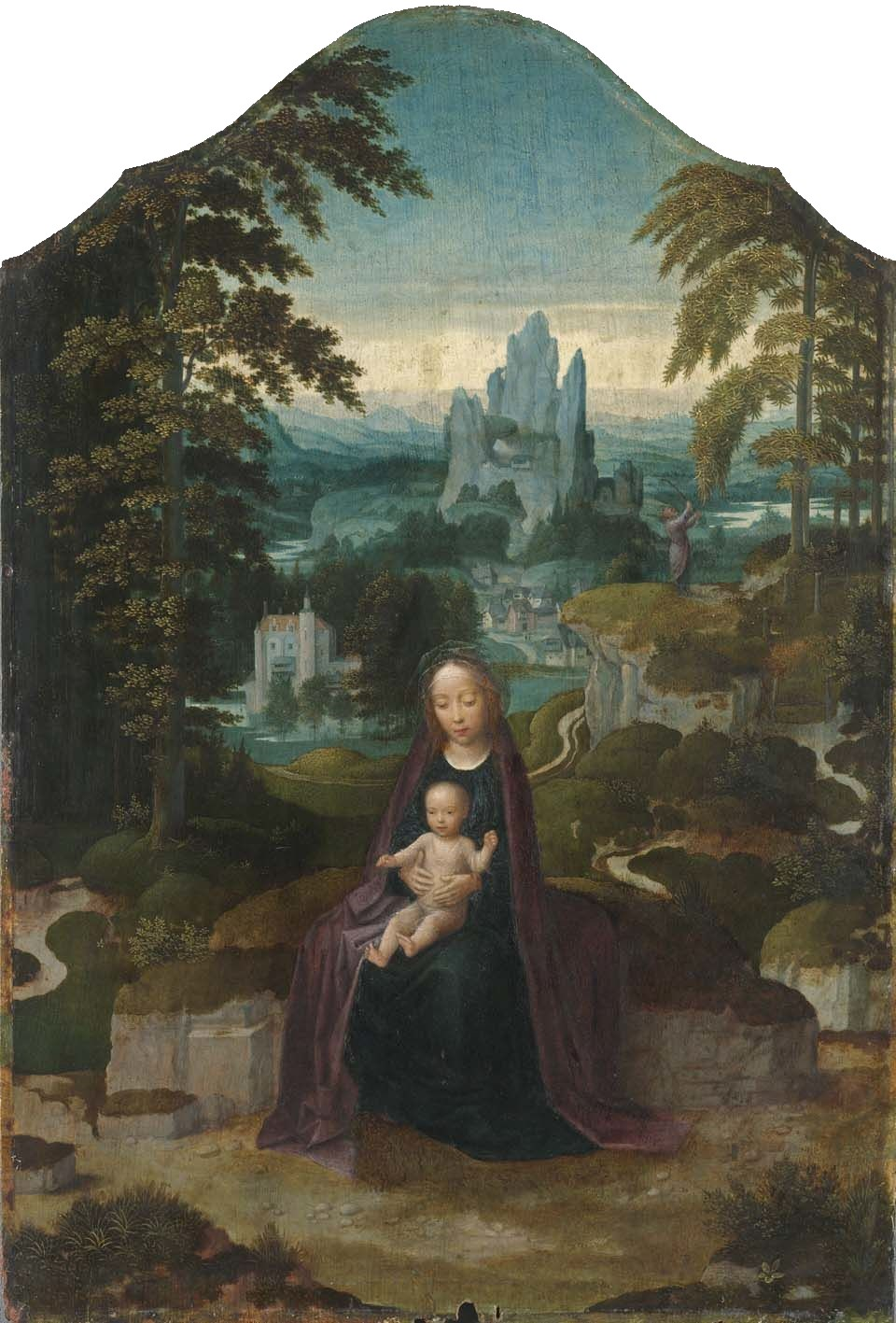
One of many versions of the Rest on the Flight into Egypt attributed to Isenbrandt or his workshop. Alte Pinakothek, Munich; Wood, 49,4 × 34 cm

Adriaen Isenbrandt or Adriaen Ysenbrandt (between 1480 and 1490 – July 1551) was a painter in Bruges, in the final years of Early Netherlandish painting, and the first of the Dutch and Flemish Renaissance painting of the Northern Renaissance. Documentary evidence suggests he was a significant and successful artist of his period, even though no specific works by his hand are clearly documented. Art historians have conjectured that he operated a large workshop specializing in religious subjects and devotional paintings, which were executed in a conservative style in the tradition of the Early Netherlandish painting of the previous century. By his time, the new booming economy of Antwerp had made this the centre of painting in the Low Countries, but the previous centre of Bruges retained considerable prestige.

He was believed by Georges Hulin de Loo to be the same person as the anonymous Master of the Seven Sorrows of the Virgin or Pseudo-Mostaert. Other art historians doubt that any works can be reliably attributed to him, and the number of paintings attributed to him by major museums has been in decline for many decades.

== Personal life ==
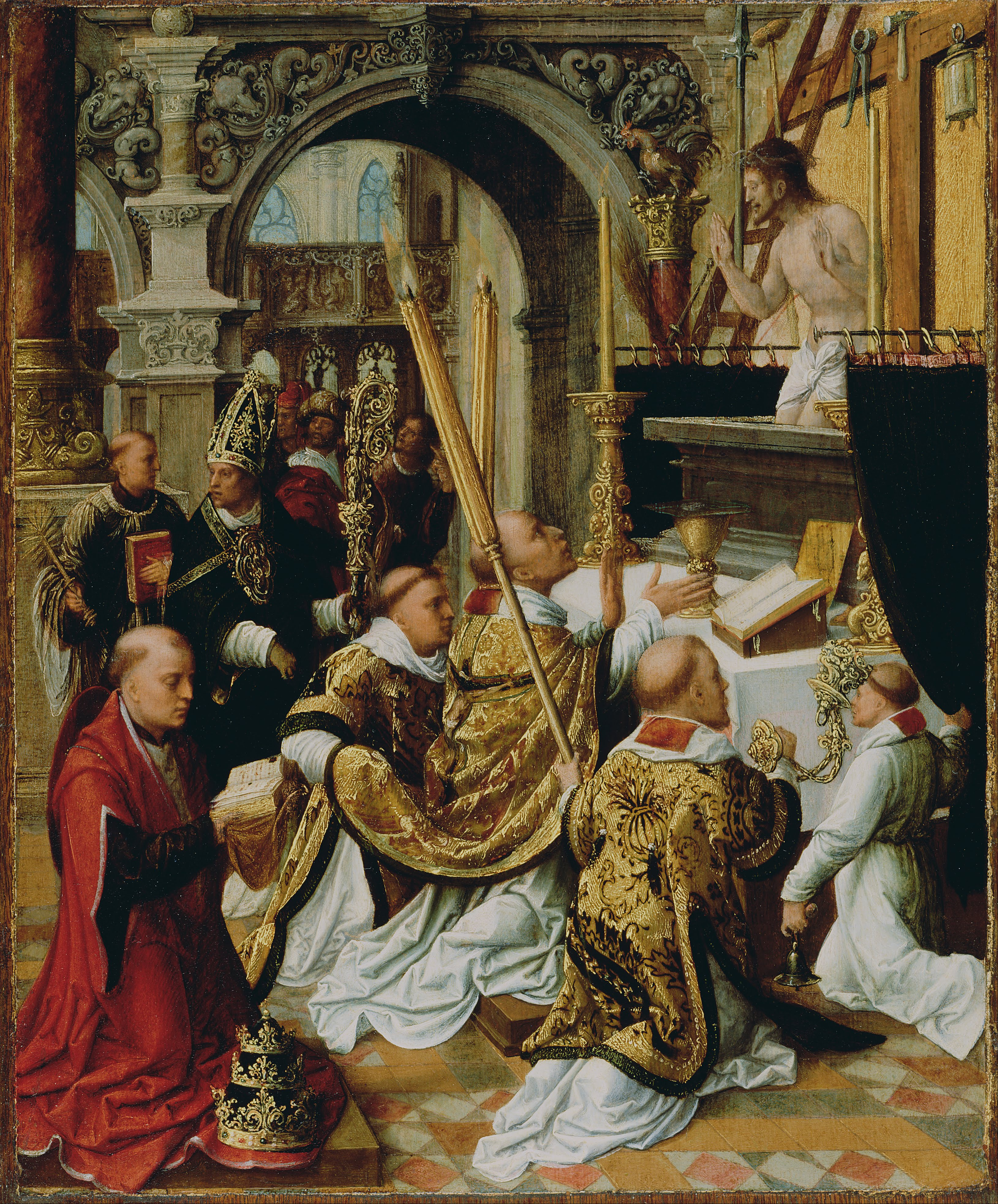
The Mass of Saint Gregory the Great (about 1510–1550), oil on panel, 362 mm × 292 mm (14.3 in × 11.5 in), J. Paul Getty Museum

There are only a few documentary records of his life, and some mentions in literature from the artist's lifetime or soon after. Even so, there are no documents which link him as the creator of any surviving works. It is possible that he was born in Haarlem or Antwerp around 1490. It is not known where or with which painter he served his apprenticeship.

He is named for the first time in 1510, when he came to Bruges and bought his burghership. In November of the same year he became master in the Bruges Guild of St. Luke and the goldsmiths' guild of St. Elooi. He was later elected nine times as a "deacon" (in Old Dutch : vinder) and twice as the governor (in Old Dutch : gouverneur = treasurer) of the guild.

He quickly established an important workshop, probably in the Korte Vlaminckstraat in Bruges. This was close to the workshop of Gerard David, at the Vlamijncbrugghe and the former workshop of Hans Memling. Bruges, at that time, was one of the richest towns in Europe. Rich traders and merchants ordered diptychs and portraits for personal use. Isenbrandt painted mainly for private clients. However, there were some paintings that were created without any particular commission. He had enough work to even put out work to other painters in Bruges, as a legal suit from 1534 by Isenbrandt against Jan van Eyck (not the famous one) for non-delivery of paintings he had ordered, demonstrates. He was also appointed the agent in Bruges of the painter Adriaan Provoost (son of Jan Provoost), who had moved to Antwerp in 1530. Contemporary sources therefore mention Isenbrandt as a famous and well-to-do painter.

He married twice, the first time with Maria Grandeel, daughter of the painter Peter Grandeel. They had one child. After her death in 1537, he married again with Clementine de Haerne with whom he was married by 1543. This second marriage resulted in two daughters and a son. He also had an extramarital daughter with the innkeeper Katelijne van Brandenburch (who was at the same the mistress of the painter Ambrosius Benson).

When he died, at Bruges, in 1551, he was buried alongside his first wife at the cemetery of the St. Jacob church there; his children inherited no less than four houses with surrounding property.

== Professional life ==
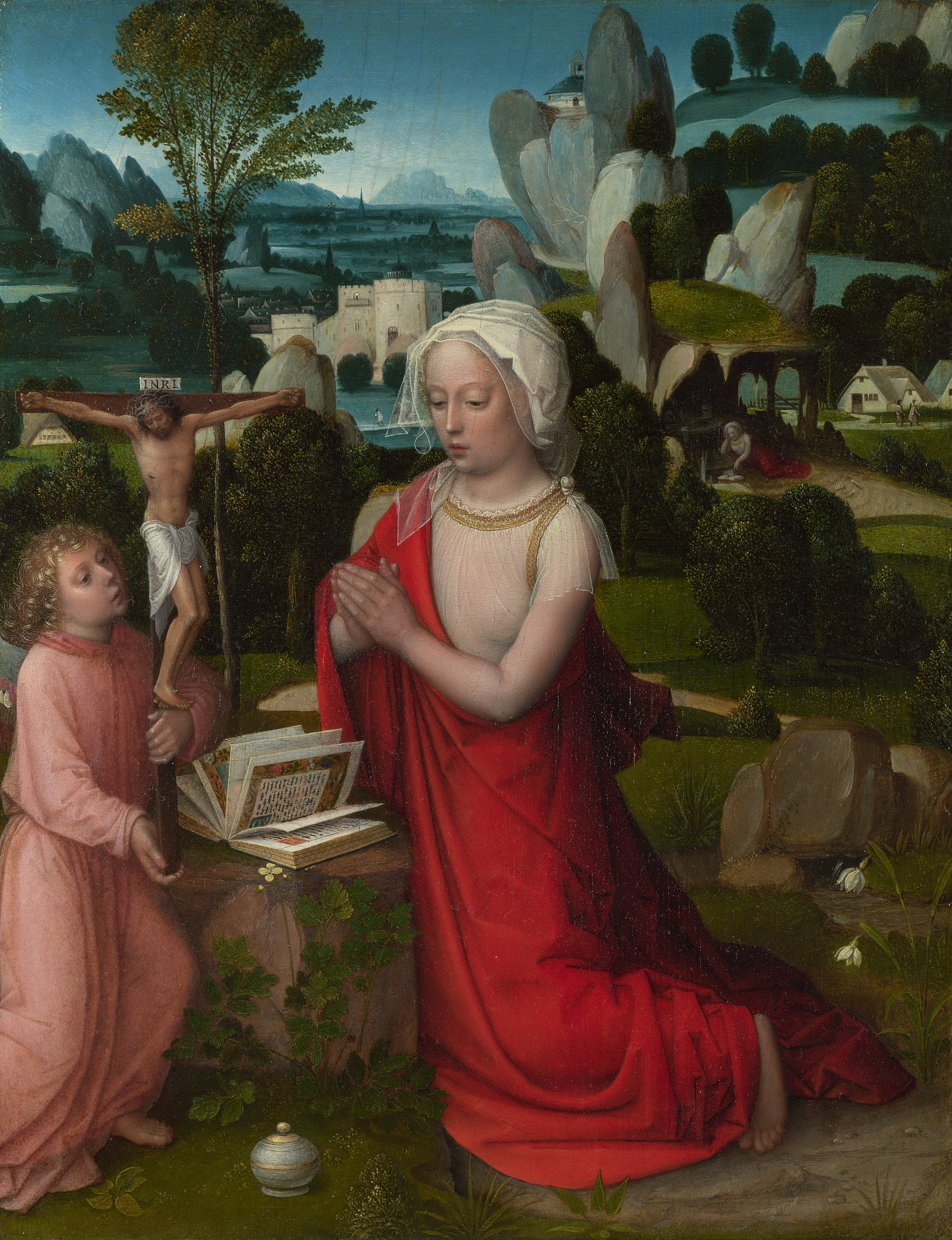
The Magdalen in a Landscape, c. 1510–1525.

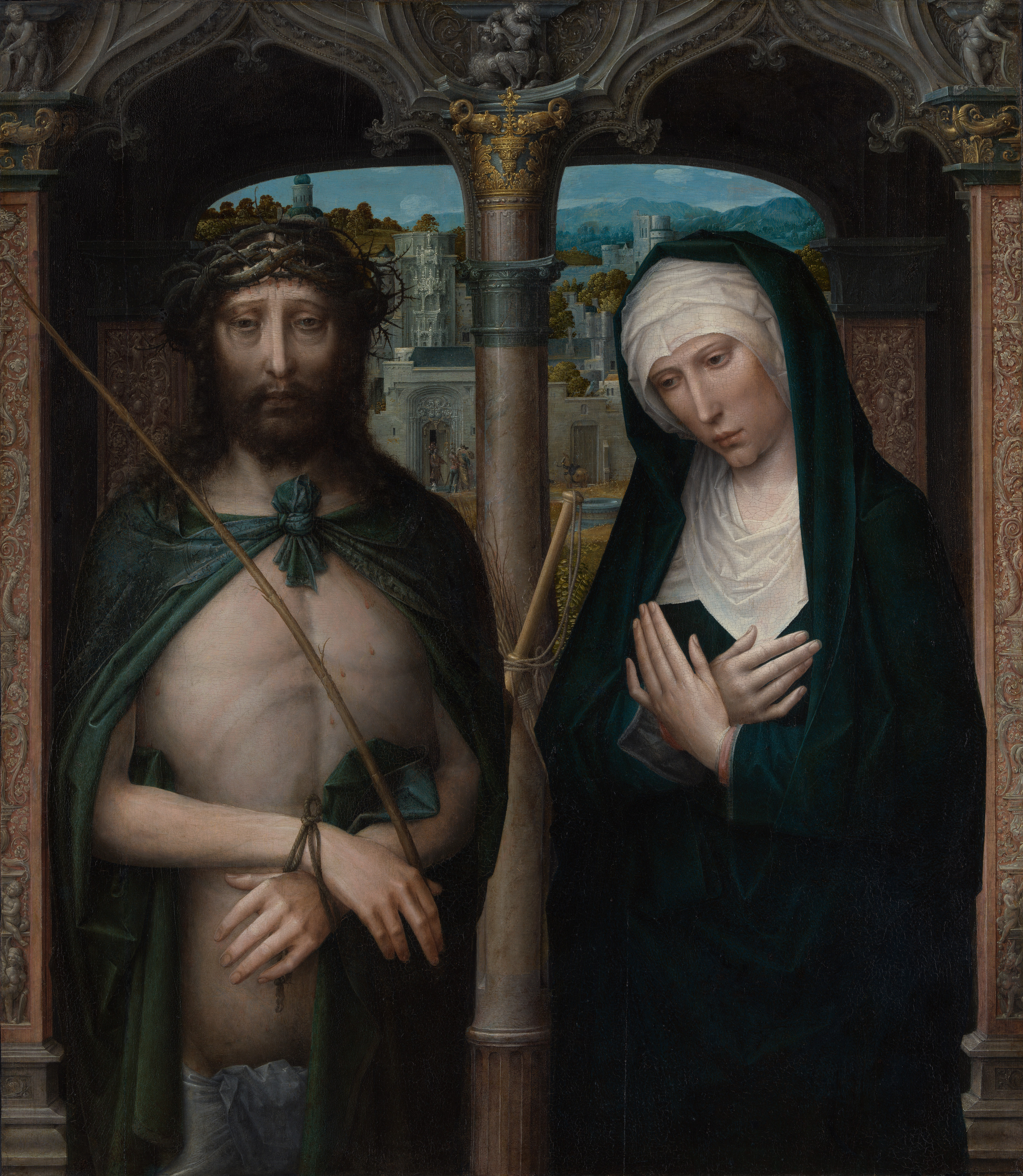
Christ Crowned with Thorns (Ecce Homo), and the Mourning Virgin,1530s, The Metropolitan Museum of Art

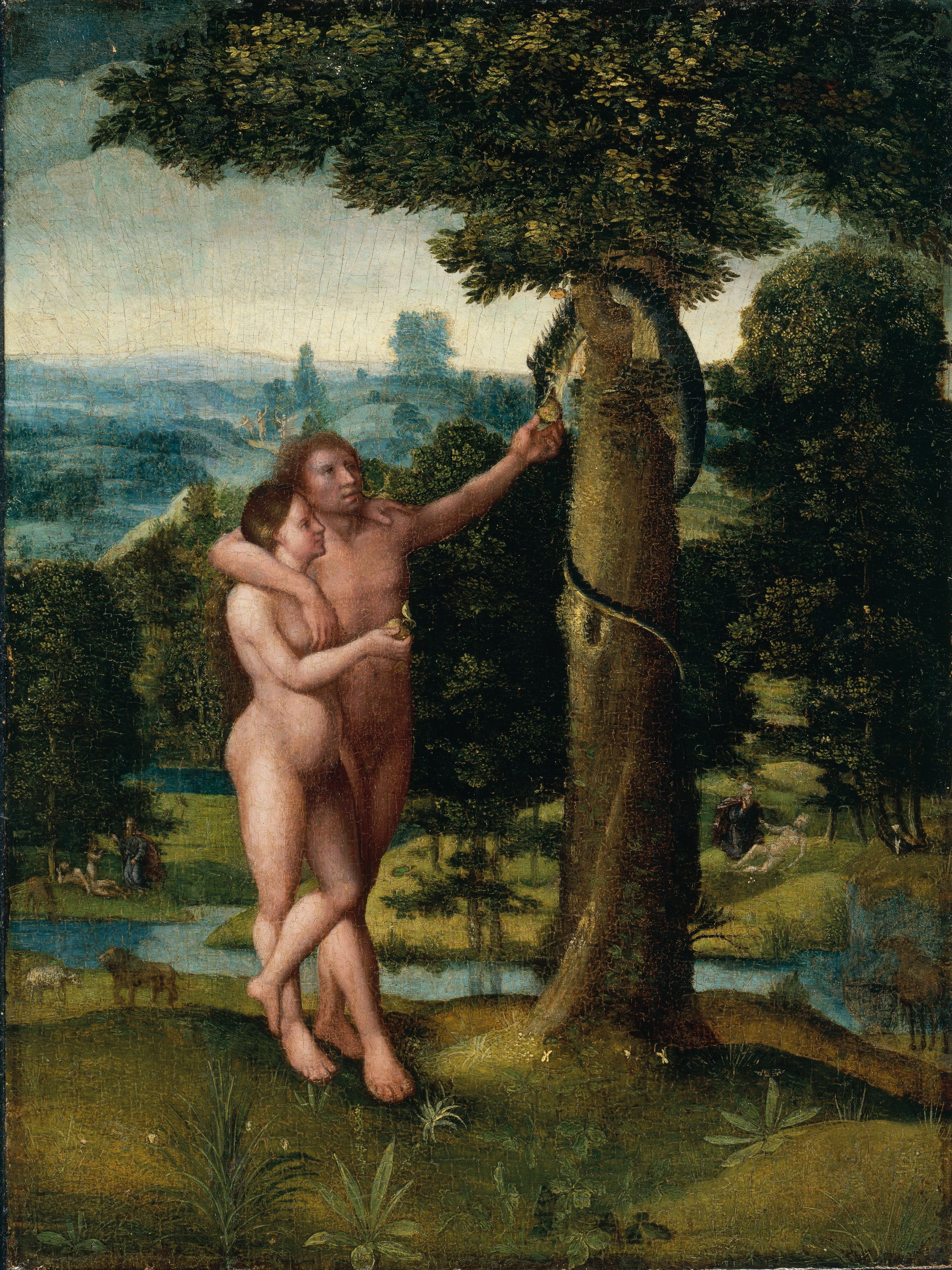
Adam and Eve, c. 1520

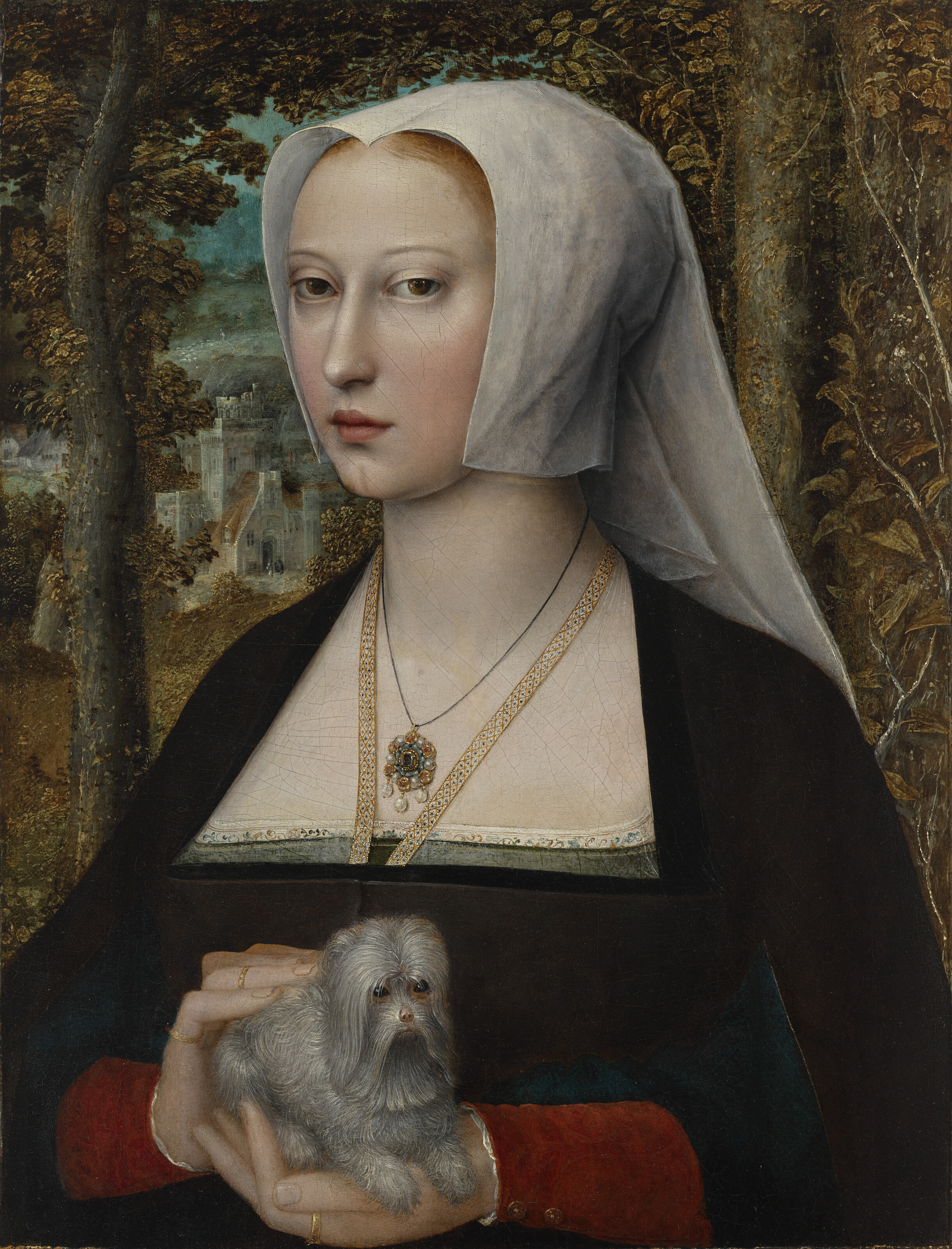
Portrait of a lady, half-length, holding a lapdog, c. 1520-1530

Along with Albert Cornelis (before 1513–1531) and Ambrosius Benson (before 1518–1550), a painter from Lombardy, he worked in the workshop of Bruges' leading painter Gerard David, while he was already a master at that time. Isenbrandt is mentioned in the book De Gandavensibus et Brugensibus eruditionis laude claris libri duo by the priest Antonius Sanderus, published in Amsterdam in 1624. This writer refers to texts of the Florentine Lodovico Guicciardini, the Schilderboeck of Karel van Mander and the (lost) notes of the Ghent jurist Dionysius Hardwijn (or Harduinus, 1530–1604). The latter, who had spent several years in Bruges about 1550, mentions Isenbrandt as a disciple of the old Gerard David, who excelled "in nudes and in portraits". He may have travelled to Genoa in 1511 together with Joachim Patinir and Gerard David. The influence of Gerard David shows clearly in the composition and the landscape background of the works attributed to Isenbrandt.

In his critical exhibition catalogue of Early Flemish Masters in Bruges in 1902, the Ghent great connoisseur of early Flemish Art and art historian Georges Hulin de Loo, came to the conclusion that Isenbrandt was actually the anonymous Master of the Seven Sorrows of the Virgin and the author of a large body of paintings previously attributed to Gerard David and Jan Mostaert by the German art historian Gustav Friedrich Waagen. He is therefore sometimes called the Pseudo-Mostaert. Even if this attribution to Isenbrandt cannot be proven without doubt, it is now generally accepted by some art historians, although many others regard Isenbrandt as a convenient label for a body of work by many different artists.

No surviving painting can be firmly documented as by Isenbrandt. A document stating that he sent some paintings from Antwerp to Spain shows that worked for export as well as the local market, and suggests his international reputation. Two paintings usually associated with him are dated, both in 1518 :

- Portrait of Paulus de Nigro (Groeninge Museum, Bruges) (1518)
- The Bröhmse triptych with the Adoration by the Magi. This was his most monumental work, but it was destroyed in 1942 when the Marienkirche in Lübeck was bombed. For Max J. Friedländer, this was the key work to be used in establishing his style.

One of his first paintings (c. 1518–1521) was the "Our Lady of the Seven Sorrows, adored by the family Van de Velde", a diptych that can be seen in the Church of Our Lady in Bruges and its left panel in the Royal Museums of Fine Arts of Belgium, Brussels.

It was common practice for major artists, such as Isenbrandt, to paint only the major parts of his paintings, such as faces and the flesh parts of his figures. His faces and flesh areas are set apart by brown pigment. The background was then filled in by assistants. The end quality of a work depended largely on the quality of the execution and the competency of the assistants, leading to an uneven quality of his works. These assistants also painted, as this was common practice in those times, many versions of the "Madonna and Child", that were then attributed to Isenbrandt, giving him the reputation of having had an enormous body of work. The exhibition in Bruges of Early Netherlandish painting in 1902 showed therefore a large collection of his works. Unlike many contemporary colleagues, he is only documented with one assistant, Cornelis van Callenberghe, who joined his workshop in 1520.

In 1520 he worked, together with Albert Cornelis and Lanceloot Blondeel, on the decorations for the Triumphal Entry of Emperor Charles V into Bruges.

His paintings are executed meticulously and with great refinement. His figures are painted in warmer tones and more lively colours, than the works of Gerard David. Especially the flaming red or the dark blue set against an idyllic background of a lush, hilly landscape with castles situated on top of a vertical rock (typical for Isenbrandt), sinuous rivers and thick-leaved trees (showing the influence of Gerard David). He not only copied the compositions of Gerard David, but also from older painters such as Jan van Eyck, Hugo van der Goes and Hans Memling. He borrowed compositions from Jan Gossaert (leading to the confusion with this painter) and drawings from Albrecht Dürer and Martin Schongauer. Such borrowing from older compositions was the order of the day and common practice. Nevertheless, the paintings of Adriaen Isenbrandt retain their individuality.

He also painted some portraits, such as the portrait of Paulus de Nigro (Groeninge Museum, Bruges ), "Man weighing gold" (1515–1520) (Metropolitan Museum, New York ) and "Young Man with a Rosary" (Norton Simon Museum, Pasadena, California ). These portraits, even if they are stereotypical and lifeless, are executed with a soft touch and sfumato effect in the contours.

The influence of the Italian Renaissance can be seen in the detailed addition of fashionable scenery elements such as volutes, antique pillars and ram's heads, such as in his painting of the "Mass of Saint Gregory the Great" ( J. Paul Getty Museum, Los Angeles ). and "Mary and Child" (1520–1530) (Rijksmuseum, Amsterdam ). Through these elements he may be regarded as a precursor of the Renaissance painter Lanceloot Blondeel.

He is often compared with Ambrosius Benson (c. 1495–1550), a painter from Lombardy who emigrated to Bruges. He may have introduced the sfumato technique to Isenbrandt.

Together with Benson, Isenbrandt belongs to a generation overlapping and succeeding the generation of Gerard David and Jan Provoost.

== Selected works ==
Many works are now in the collections of the major museums of the world, such as:

- Virgin and Child (Museu Nacional Machado de Castro, Coimbra, 1505–1510)
- Virgin and Child Enthroned (Private collection) (1510s)
- Triptych of the Presentation of Jesus at the Temple (Sint-Salvator Cathedral, Bruges)
- Triptych with St. Jerome, St. Catherine and the Magdalen (Kunsthalle, Hamburg) (1510–1520)
- Madonna and Child with a member of the Hillensberger family (Lowe Art Museum, University of Miami, Coral Gables, Florida)
- Our Lady of the Seven Sorrows (Church of Our Lady, Bruges) (c. 1518) (Currently in Royal Museum of Fine Arts, Brussels)
- The Magdalen in a landscape (National Gallery, London) (1515–1520)
- Portrait of Paulus de Nigro (Groeningemuseum, Bruges) (1518)
- Virgin and Child (Museum of Fine Arts (Budapest) ) (1520s)
- Rest during the Flight into Egypt (Alte Pinakothek, Munich)
- Rest during the Flight into Egypt (Museum voor Schone Kunsten, Ghent) (1520–1530)
- Rest during the Flight into Egypt (Kunsthistorisches Museum, Vienna) (1520–1530)
- Rest during the Flight into Egypt (National Gallery of Ireland, Dublin) (1520–1530)
- Rest during the Flight into Egypt (Koninklijke Museum voor Schone Kunsten, Antwerp) (1520–1530/40)
- Crucifixion (Los Angeles County Museum of Art) (c. 1525)
- Crucifixion church of Noddebo, Fredensborg, Seeland (Copenhague) (1515–1521) (follower of Isenbrandt)
- The Madonna Nursing the Infant Christ (Utah Museum of Fine Arts, Salt Lake City) (ca. 1530–1535)
- Madonna and Child with cherub musicians (San Diego Museum of Art, California) (1540)
- Gethsemane (Museum für Kunst und Kulturgeschichte, Dortmund) (1530–1540)
- Archangel St Michael, St Andrew and St Francis of Assisi (Museum of Fine Arts (Budapest) )
- Mass of St Gregory (Museo del Prado, Madrid)
- The Magdalen (Museo del Prado, Madrid)
- Triptych (Groeningemuseum, Bruges)
- The Deposition (Ashmolean Museum at the University of Oxford,)
- Virgin and Child (Fondation Bemberg Museum, Toulouse, France)
- Saints and donors (diptych) (Museo Nacional de Bellas Artes, Buenos Aires, Argentina)
- St Peter and donor (Staatliche Museen zu Berlin)
- Image of a woman (Galleria Doria Pamphili, Rome)
- Mary and Child (Staatliche Museen zu Berlin)
- Adoration by the Magi (Alte Pinakothek, Munich)
- Beata Virgo inter Virgines (Alte Pinakothek, Munich) (copy after Gerard David)
- Triptych with the Assumption of Mary (Musée de Cluny, Paris) (1520–1530 ?)
- Donor with the saints Peter and Paul (Private collection, London)
- Birth of Christ (Öffentliche Kunstsammlung, Kunstmuseum, Basel) (1520–1530)
- Birth of Christ (Museum Mayer van den Bergh, Antwerp) (1530–1550)
- Our Lady enthroned in a niche (Rijksmuseum, Amsterdam)
- St Jerome (Private collection, London) (1560–1570) (by follower of Adriaen Isenbrandt or Ambrosius Benson)

No longer attributed to him by the owners:

- Rest during the Flight to Egypt (Staatliche Museen zu Berlin) (1520)
- The Entombment (National Gallery, London) (about 1550)
