= Pieter Helbert Damsté =

Dutch classical scholar (1860–1943)

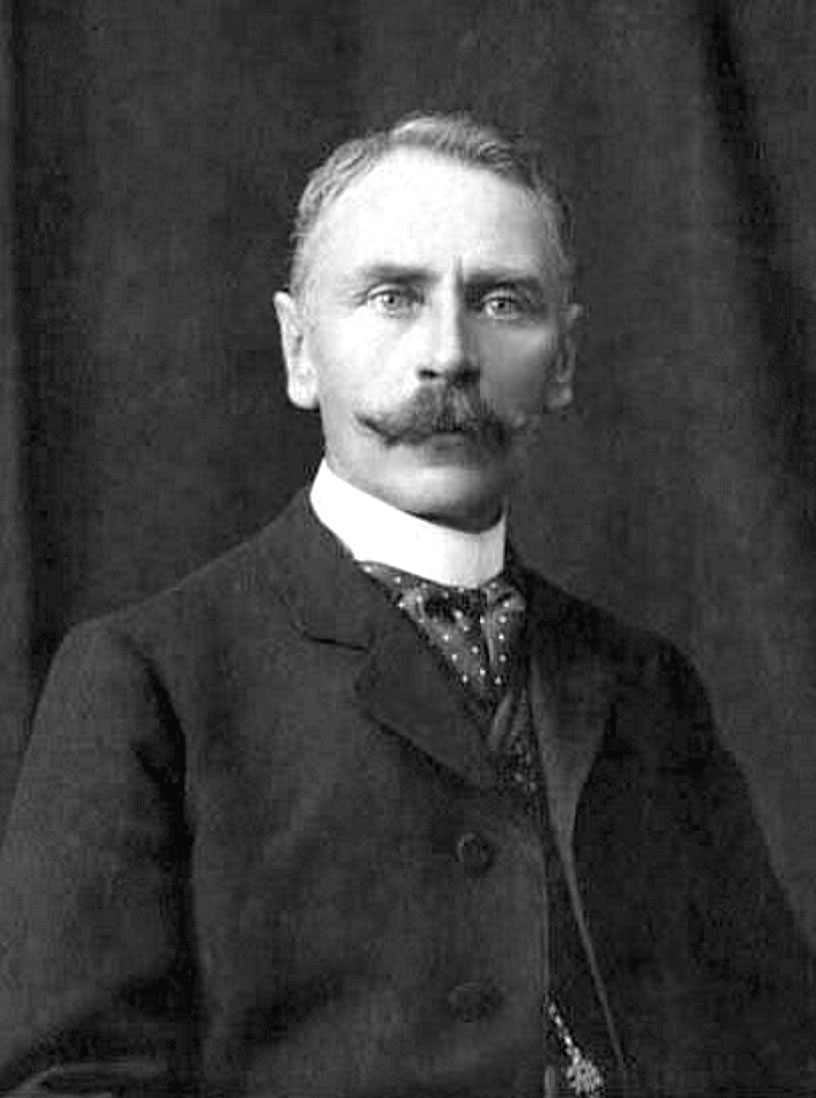
Pieter Helbert Damsté

Pieter Helbert Damsté (August 10, 1860 – February 5, 1943) was a Dutch classical scholar.

== Biography ==
Damsté was born in Wilsum as the son of preacher Barteld Roelof Damsté and Richardina Jacoba Gesina Gallé. His 1885 dissertation was called Adversaria critica ad C. Valerii Flacci Argonautica. He taught Latin at Utrecht University.
