= Jan Willemsz Lapp =

Dutch Golden Age landscape painter

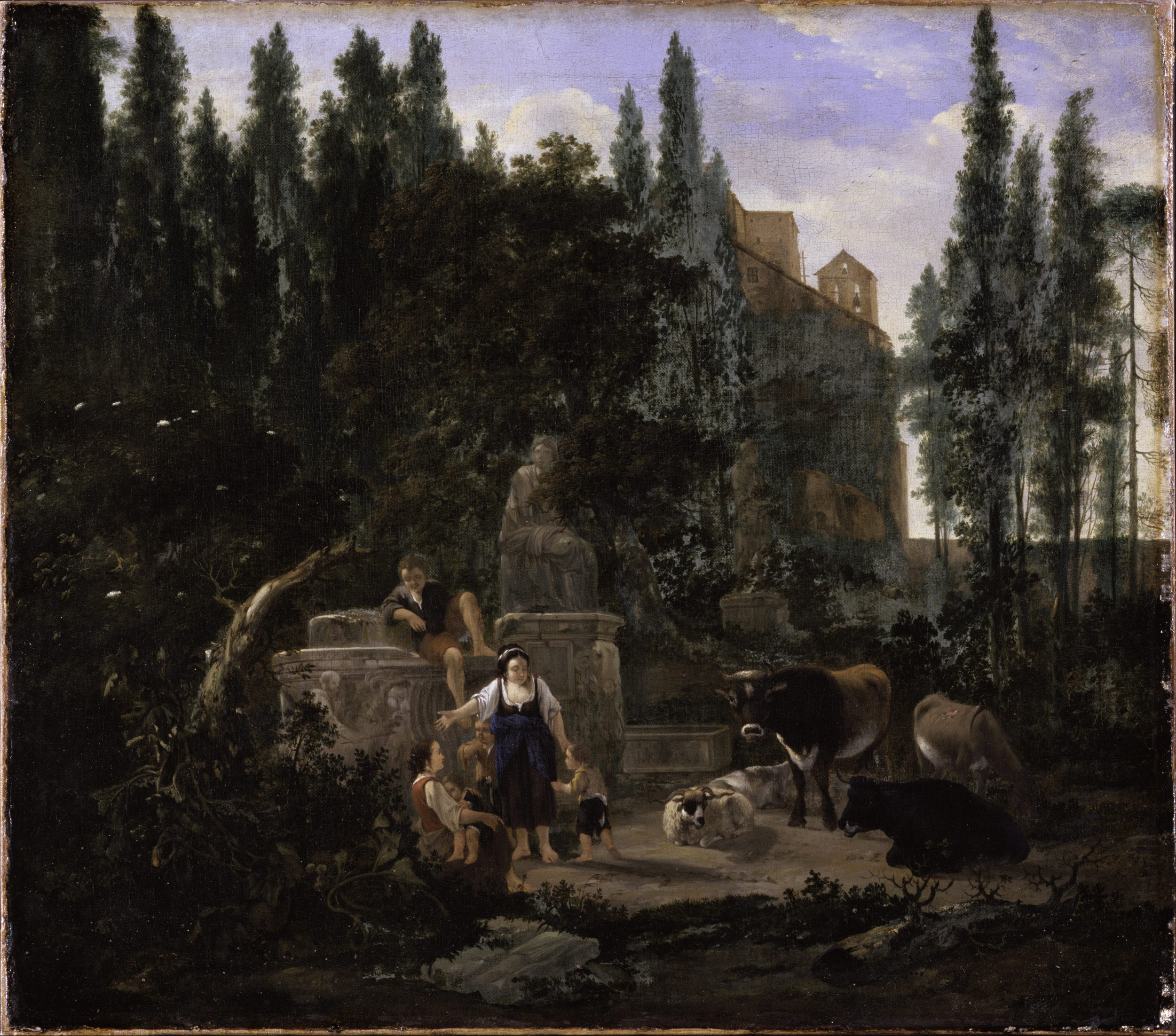
An Italian Landscape with Figures and Cattle

Jan Willemsz Lapp (1585 – 1663), was a Dutch Golden Age landscape painter.

== Biography ==
He was born in The Hague and travelled to Rome in 1605. On his return he became a member of the Guild of St. Luke in The Hague in 1625. He was last registered in Leiden in 1662 and in Amsterdam in 1663. It is unknown where he died.
