= Albert Cornelis =

Flemish Renaissance painter

The Glorification of the Virgin

Albert Cornelis (c.1475 – 4 September 1532) was a 16th-century Flemish Renaissance painter.

Not much is known about Cornelis' life except through his works. He primarily painted religious-themed paintings for church commissions. One work executed by Cornelis The Glorification of the Virgin is part of the Brighton Museum & Art Gallery collection. An altarpiece depicting a similar subject, Coronation of the Virgin, in the Church of St. Jacques, Bruges has also been attributed to him. He died on 4 September 1532 in Bruges.
