= Sybrand van Beest =

Dutch Golden Age painter

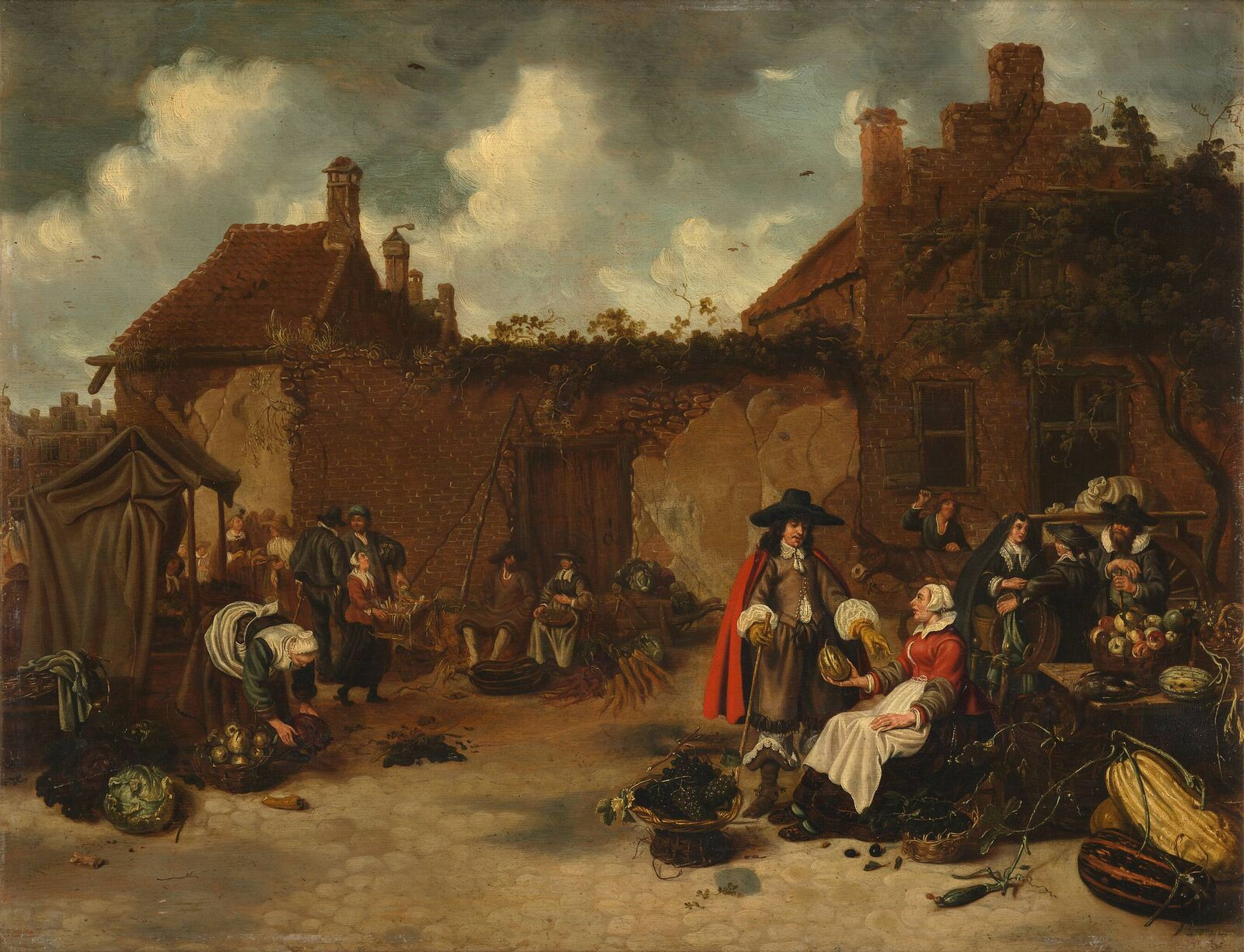
A vegetable and fruit market, 1652

Sybrand van Beest (c. 1610 – 1674) was a Dutch Golden Age painter.

== Biography ==
He was born in The Hague and became a pupil of Adriaen van de Venne. He was influenced by Jan van Goyen and is known for landscapes with figures in the manner of Isaac van Ostade.

He died in Amsterdam.
