= Dirck Hals =

Painter from the Northern Netherlands (1591–1656)

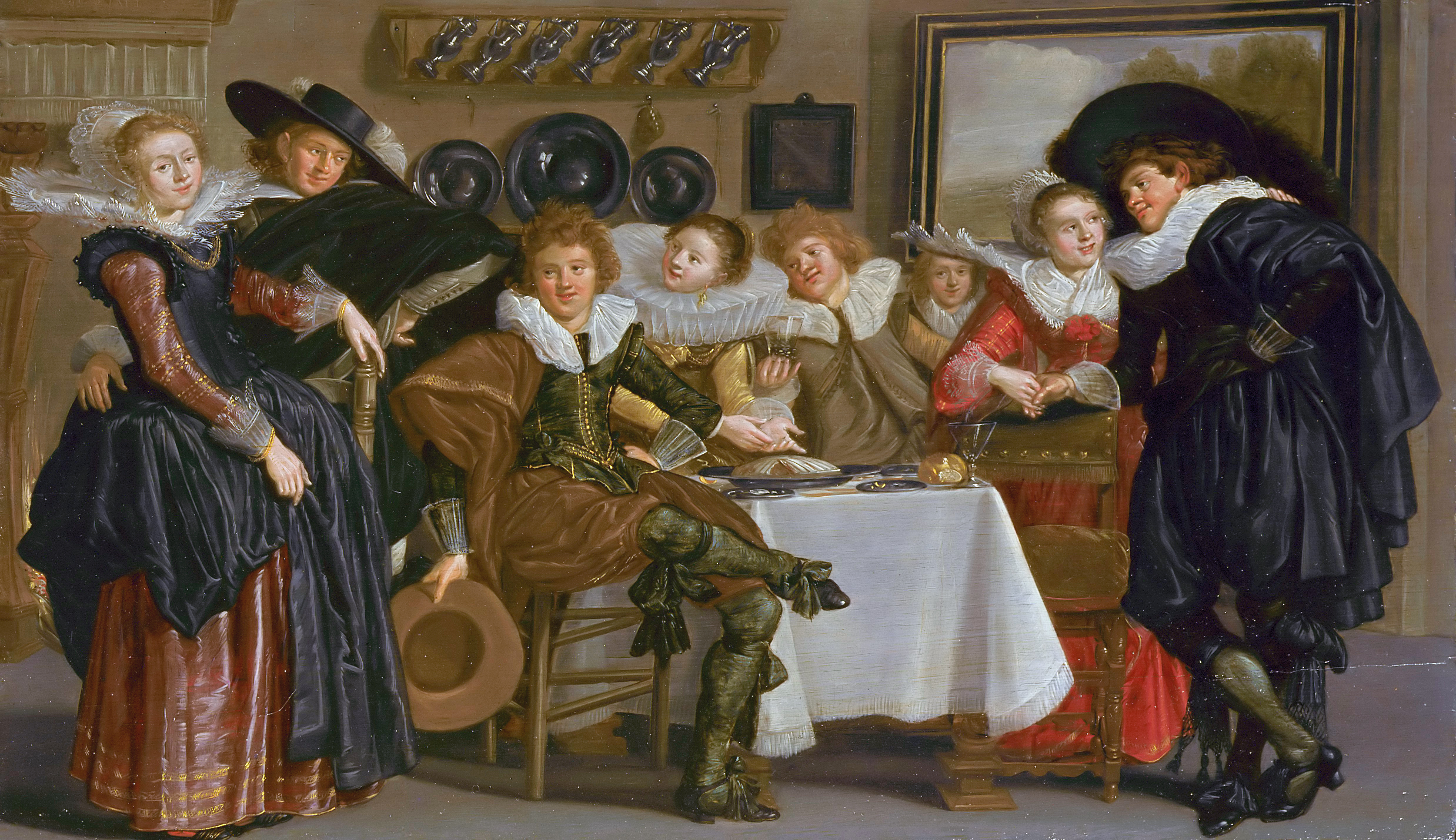
Merry Company, 1635, Mauritshuis

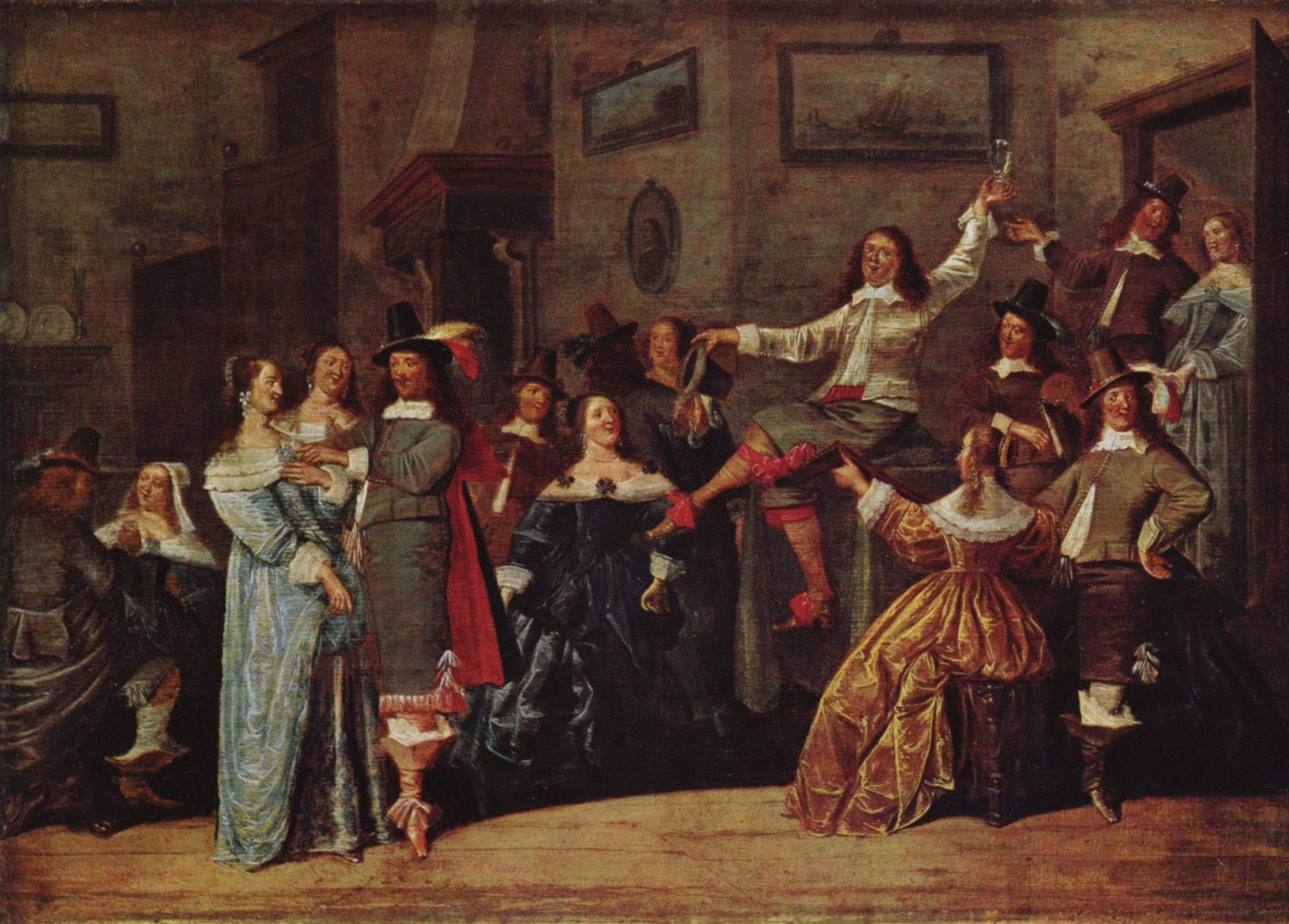
Dirck Hals, Merry Company, Staatsgalerie Stuttgart, 1640

Dirck Hals (19 March 1591 – 17 May 1656), born at Haarlem, was a Dutch Golden Age painter of merry company scenes, festivals and ballroom scenes. He played a role in the development of these types of genre painting. He was somewhat influenced by his elder brother Frans Hals, but painted few portraits.

== Biography ==
According to Houbraken he was the brother of the painter Frans Hals and was specialized in small paintings of "conversation pieces" or "merry companies" (Dutch: Gezelschapjes), scenes of small groups drinking and enjoying themselves. The Haarlem writer Samuel Ampzing mentions both brothers in his Praise of Haarlem with a poem stating that both brothers were exceptional; Frans painting his portraits "awake", and Dirck painting his figures "purely".

According to the RKD he worked in Leiden in 1641 and 1648, and was an influence on the painters Nathaniel Bacon, Johann Hulsman, and Willem Cornelisz Duyster. His son Anthonie also became a painter. He was buried in the Waalse Kerk (Haarlem).
