= Caullery (surname) =

Caullery is a surname. Notable people with the surname include:

- Louis de Caullery (c. 1580–1621), pioneer of the genre of courtly gatherings in Flemish painting of the 17th century
- Maurice Caullery (1868–1958), French biologist
