= The Garden of Love (Rubens) =

1633 painting by Peter Paul Rubens

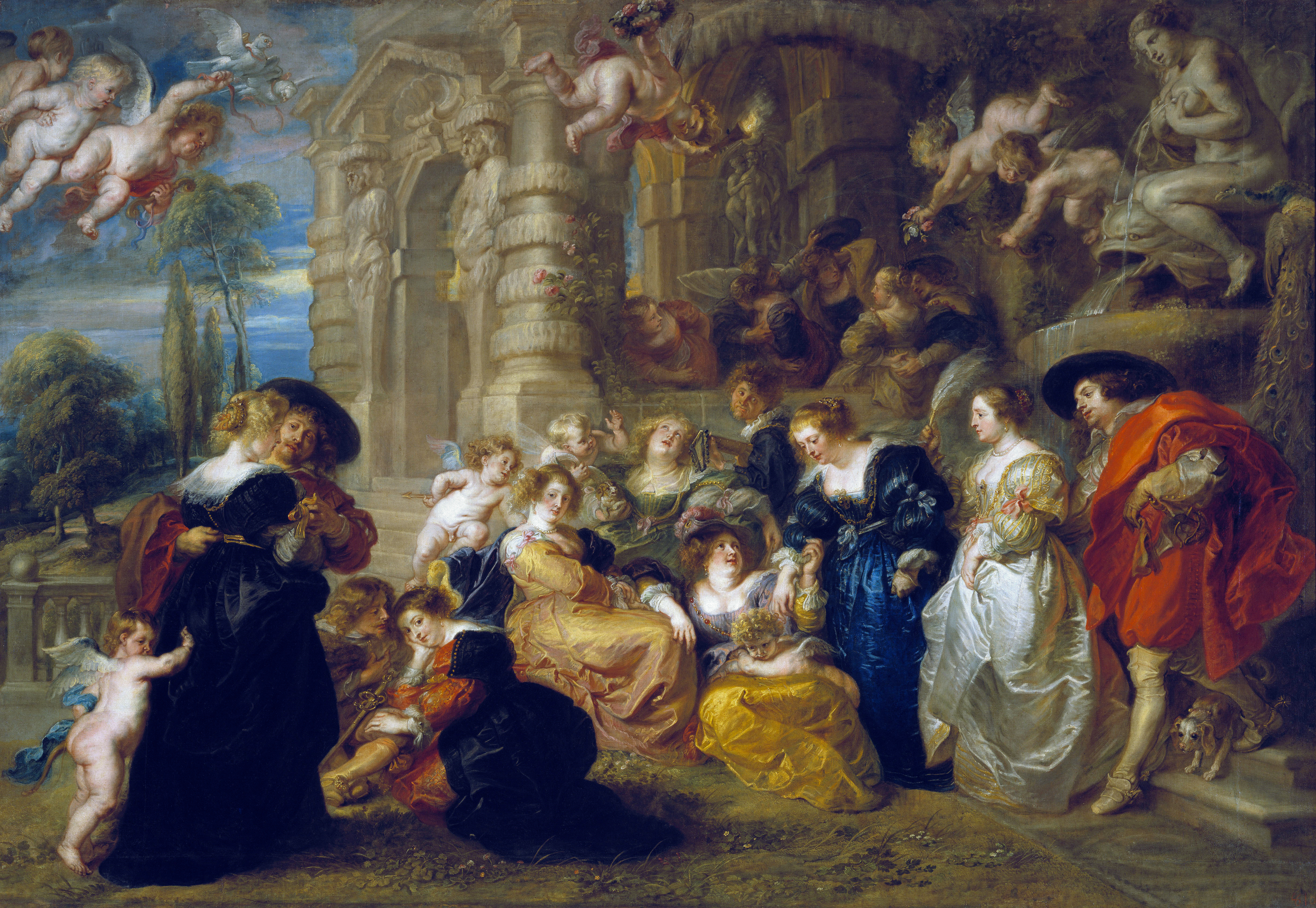
- Artist: Peter Paul Rubens
- Year: 1630s
- Medium: Oil on canvas
- Movement: Baroque
- Dimensions: 199 cm × 286 cm (78 in × 113 in)
- Location: Museo del Prado; Madrid

The Garden of Love is a painting by Rubens, produced in around 1633 and now in the Prado Museum in Madrid. The work was first listed in 1666, when it was hung in the Royal Palace of Madrid, in the Spanish king's bedroom. In early inventories, the painting was called The Garden Party.

It is the apotheosis of the outdoor courtly Merry Company genre painting, and anticipates the French Fête champêtre type of the next century. The subject of this piece is common in Baroque paintings, which used exaggerated motion and clear, easily interpreted detail to produce drama, tension, and grandeur. Rubens uses multi-layer allegory and symbolism to his paintings.

== Description ==
In this 6.5 ft x 9.4 ft piece, a large group of well-dressed persons in the style of the 17th century lounge about at the edge of an idyllic garden. Everyone is finely dressed, exercising their wealth and high class status. This demonstrates the depth of a full court scene in a recessional manner. Cupids interact with the individuals, bringing mythological figures into a realistic garden scene to produce a fantastical painting.

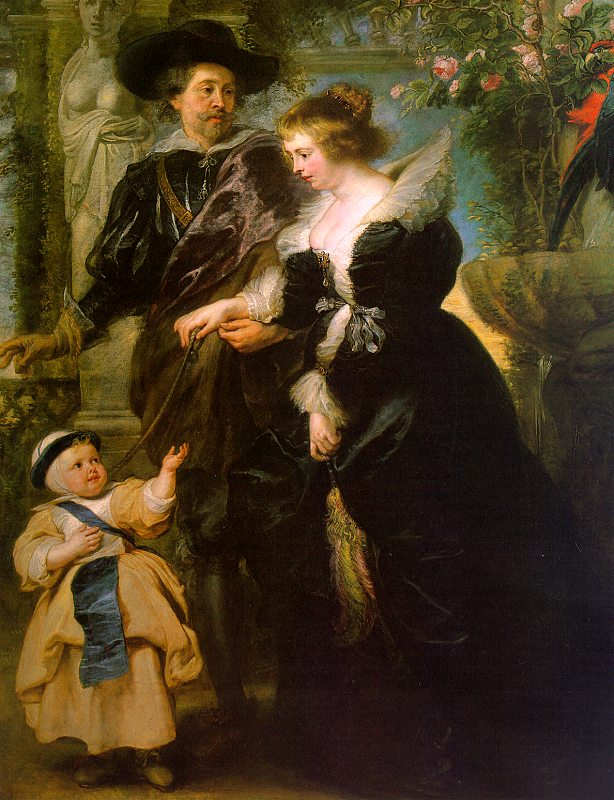
Rubens with Hélène Fourment and their son Peter Paul, 1639, now in the Metropolitan Museum of Art

All around the group, symbols of matrimonial love can be found including: the cupids, a pair of doves, flower crowns, music making, and Juno’s peacock. The dogs represent loyalty and fealty. The garden represents Paradise, but also fertility. This painting is an allegory and exaltation of love and marriage, as well as the merry company.

In the far-left corner, a male gentleman escorts a woman in all-black towards the entourage. The man is believed to be Rubens, which led to the early identification of this painting to be a self-portrait with friends. The Garden of Love is believed to be celebration of his marriage to Rubens’ wife: Hélène Fourment.

Helena Fourment was the second wife of Rubens. She was the subject of a few portraits by Rubens, and modeled for other religious and mythological paintings.

== The Fountains ==
The fountains of the Three Graces and the Venus represent marital happiness. The Three Graces fountains are three Rubenesque nude females—soft bodied, voluptuous, and highly sexualized beings. These forms emphasize fertility and physical beauty, mirroring the beautiful garden scene. Directly below the Graces, an unsuspecting group of individuals getting sprayed by the fountain. The second fountain also depicts a nude female—this time having the nude Venus sitting on the back of a fish and producing a stream of water from her breasts. This is known as the Nursing Venus and is meant to symbolize child bearing and rearing.

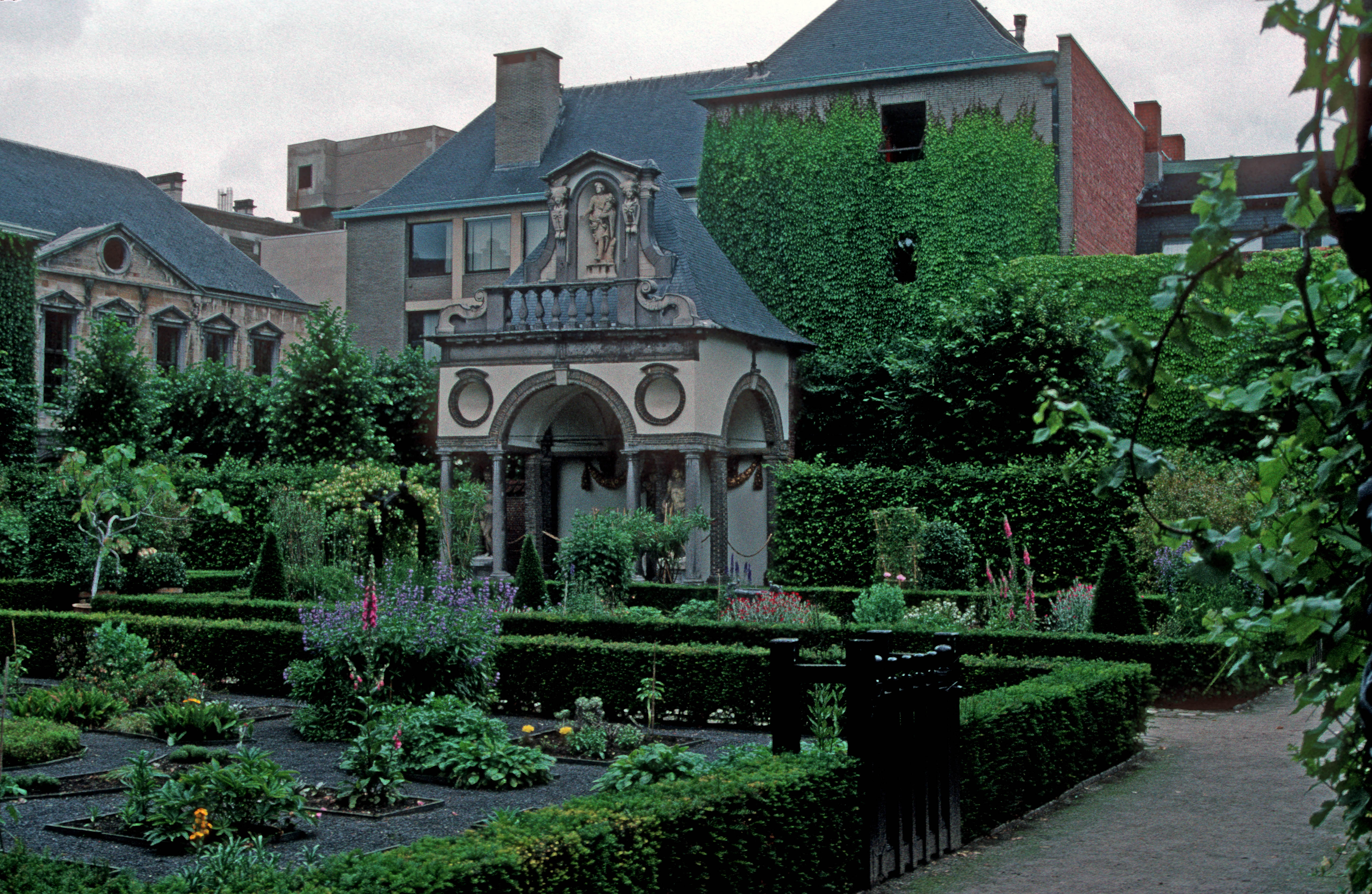
Rubens' home in Antwerp

This full-figured woman is identified by the peacock to be the goddess Juno, who is the goddess of marriage. Rubens plays on recognizable themes that his contemporary audience would recognize.

== Influence ==
Rubens’ merry company was influenced by Adriaen Brouwer, a Baroque Flemish artist, who painted intensely naturalistic merry company genre scenes. While only 60 works of his are known, Brouwer’s work influenced the next generation of Flemish and Dutch genre painters. Brouwer painted atmospheric landscapes, painted with loose brushstrokes—the influence of this style can be seen in Rubens' piece.

== Bibliography ==
- Burchard, Wolfgang. "The 'Garden of Love' by Rubens." The Burlington Magazine 105, no. 727 (1963): 428-426.
- Films Media Group and Films for the Humanities. Peter Paul Rubens the Garden of Love. New York, N.Y: Films Media Group, 1985.
- Goodman, Elise. "Rubens's Conversatie La Mode: Garden of Leisure, Fashion, and Gallantry." The Art Bulletin 64, no. 2 (1982): 247-259.
- (in German) Rose-Marie und Rainer Hagen: Bildbetrachtungen – Meisterwerke im Detail, Benedikt Taschen Verlag, Köln 1994
- Russell, Douglas. "The Problem of Style in Costume Design." Educational Theatre Journal 20, no. 4 (1968): 545-562.
- Volk, Mary Crawford. "Rubens in Madrid and the Decoration of the King's Summer Apartments." The Burlington Magazine 123, no. 942 (1981): 513-529.
- Zeri, Federico, Marco Dolcetta, Elena Mazour, and Raman A. Montanaro. Rubens, Garden of Love. Richmond Hill, Ont: NDE Pub, 1999.
