= Fête champêtre =

18th-century French garden party

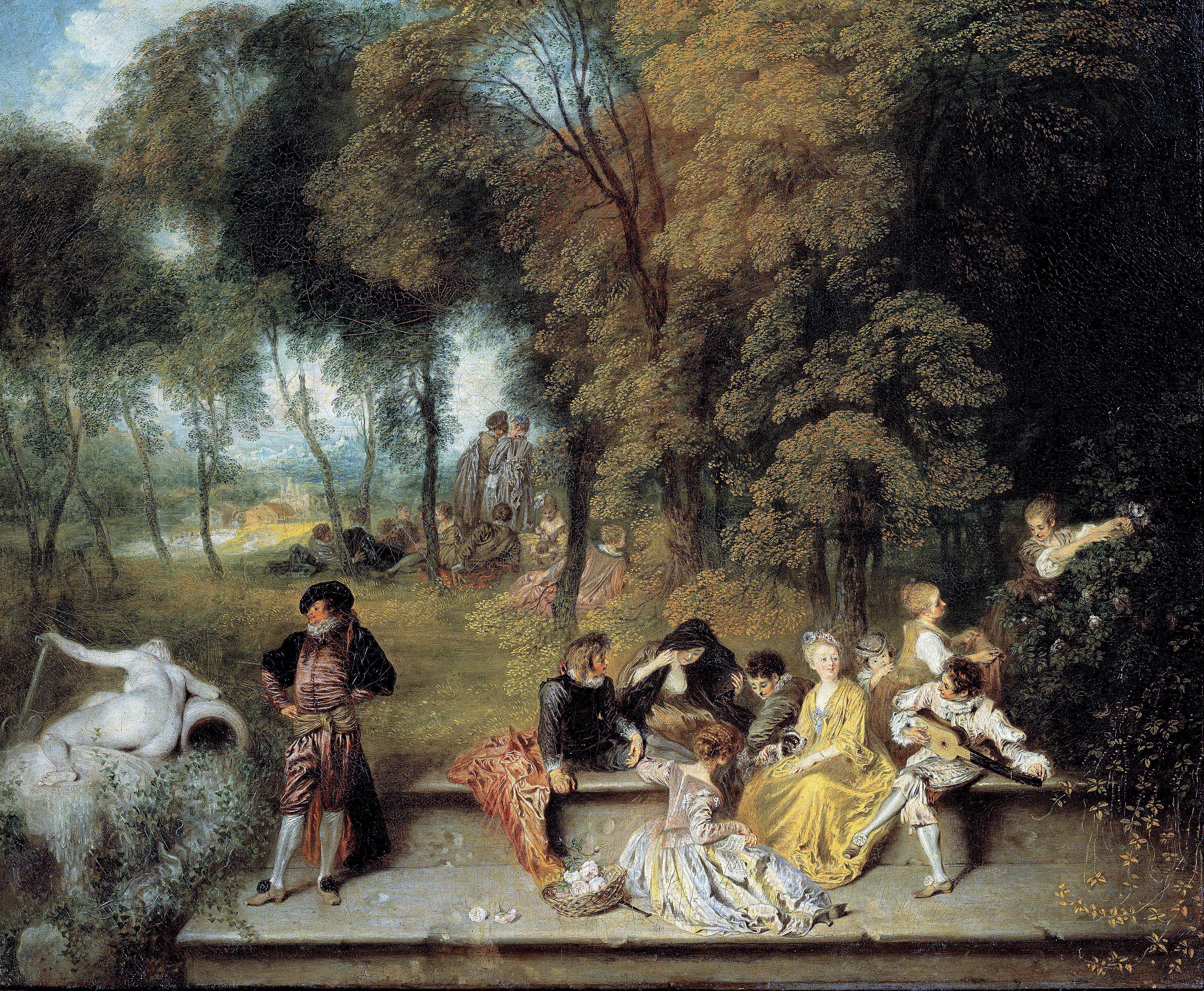
Antoine Watteau, Pleasures of Love, c. 1719.

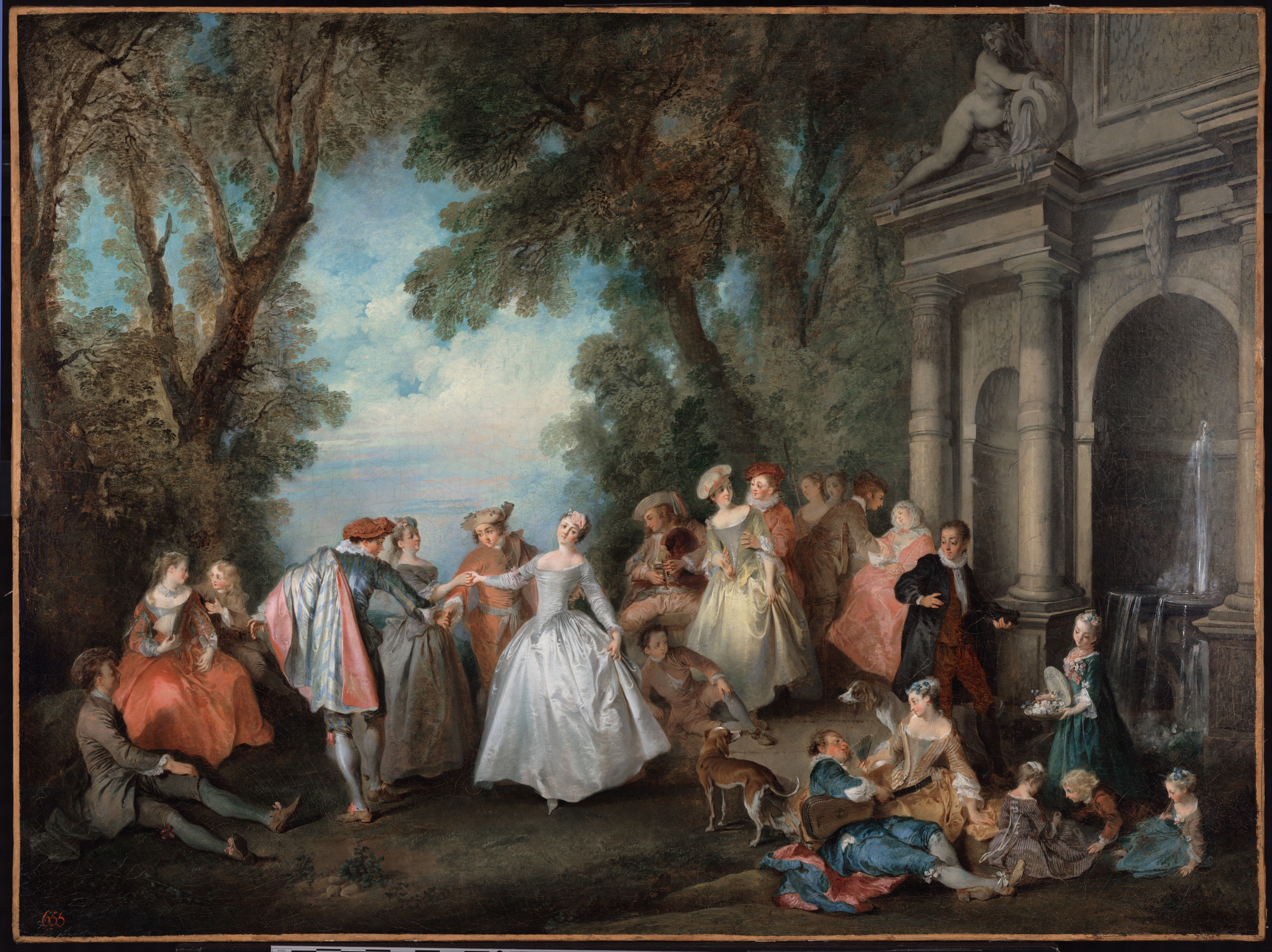
Nicolas Lancret 18th century courtiers in fancy dress, at a fête champêtre in a landscaped park, before 1727.

A fête champêtre was a form of entertainment in the 18th century, taking the form of a garden party. This form of entertainment was particularly practised by the French court, where in the Gardens of Versailles and elsewhere areas of the park were landscaped with follies, pavilions, and temples to accommodate such festivities.

The term is a French expression, very literally translating as "party in the fields", meaning a "pastoral festival" or "country feast" and in theory was a simple form of entertainment, perhaps little more than a picnic or informal open air dancing. In practice, especially in the 18th century, the simplicity of the event was often contrived. A fête champêtre was often a very elegant form of entertainment involving on occasions whole orchestras hidden in trees, with guests sometimes in fancy dress.

Such events became a popular subject in French 18th-century painting, representing a glamourized aristocratic form of pastoral, with "scenes of well dressed dalliance in a park setting".

== In art ==
Antoine Watteau invented the genre, from around 1710, and is its best exponent, imitated by others such as Nicolas Lancret and Jean-Baptiste Pater. In 1717 the French Academy expanded its categories of painting to include what it termed the fête galante especially for Watteau's reception piece The Embarkation for Cythera, now in the Louvre. Watteau's examples "have a quality of restraint, of unexpressed melancholy" which is absent in those by others. His paintings often include characters from the commedia dell'arte, a taste he acquired from his master, Claude Gillot.

When music is being made, as it often is, Concert champêtre or Pastoral Concert may be used as a title. The genre in painting "died a quiet death" in the early 1740s, though arguably living on in the form of porcelain figure groups for the rest of the century.

== Other periods ==
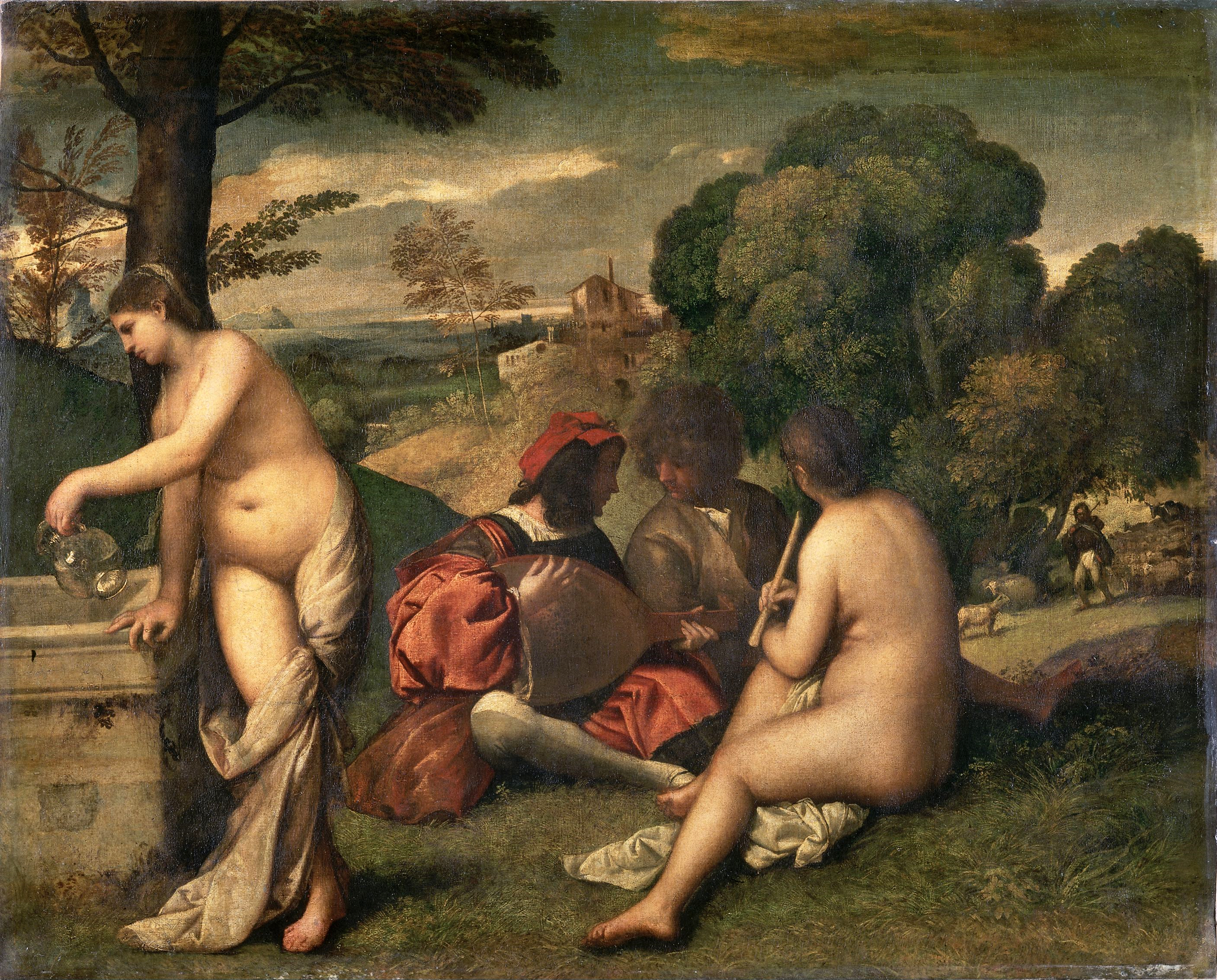
Pastoral Concert, attributed to Titian

The "Garden of Love" was a genre of medieval subjects in illuminated manuscripts, carved ivory, tapestry, and murals.

A painting dated to ca. 1509 now usually called Le Concert champêtre or the Pastoral Concert was named Fête champêtre when it entered the collection of the Louvre in 1792. It has been attributed to Giorgione, Titian, and Sebastiano del Piombo, but is now usually given to Titian. The meaning of the painting continues to be discussed by art historians.

The genre of the Merry Company in Dutch Golden Age painting is normally set indoors, and is more realistic in tone, though in Flemish Baroque painting outdoor groups are often painted. If the company is mixed in gender terms, and expensively dressed, they may be called a "Gallant Company". The Garden of Love by Rubens (1633), now in the Prado) is the apotheosis of the type. A mixed group in contemporary dress are outside a palace, accompanied by several putti.

Un dimanche après-midi à l'Île de la Grande Jatte, by Georges Seurat

Le Déjeuner sur l'herbe (Luncheon on the Grass) – originally titled Le Bain (The Bath) – by Édouard Manet (1862–3), represents a late variant of the genre, as does Un dimanche après-midi à l'Île de la Grande Jatte (A Sunday Afternoon on the Island of La Grande Jatte) by Georges Seurat (1884–6).
