= Merry Company (Honthorst) =

Painting by Gerard van Honthorst

- Artist: Gerard van Honthorst
- Year: 1622
- Medium: oil on canvas
- Dimensions: 132,8 cm × 196,6 cm (523 in × 774 in)
- Location: Alte Pinakothek, Munich

Merry Company is a 1622 oil on canvas painting by the Dutch artist Gerard van Honthorst. Set in a tavern, it is also known as The Prodigal Son, The Return or Celebratory Party. It is held in the Alte Pinakothek in Munich. The merry company, showing a group of drinkers, was a common subject-type in Dutch Golden Age painting.

== History and description ==
On 26 July 1620 the painter's return to Utrecht after about ten years in Italy was celebrated in the Utrecht tavern "Het Poortgen" at a welcome party attended by merchants, painters and copper engravers. It was extensively reported in the diary of lawyer, archaeologist and art dealer Aernout van Buchel. The painting may depict the gathering and the central figure in a blue shirt may be a self-portrait. In October the same year Van Honthorst married the tavern owner's daughter, his distant cousin Sophia Coopman, who may also have been at the welcome party. The work's chiaroscuro shows how much influence he had picked up from Caravaggio during his time abroad.

The painting was probably acquired by Philip William, Elector Palatine around 1640 and it was definitely in his possession during the 17th century. In a 1716 inventory of his estate the work was entitled The Prodigal Son, tempted with drink and tenderness in a brothel, though it is unlikely that this was the work's original title since nothing in it refers directly to that New Testament parable. Whilst the artist does not seem to be warning of the consequences of wine, women and immoral behaviour, the flickering candle held by an old woman symbolises love, vanity and the transitory nature of beauty. The old woman herself contrasts with the three beautiful young women, making the work's main theme the passing of life.
