= Louis de Caullery =

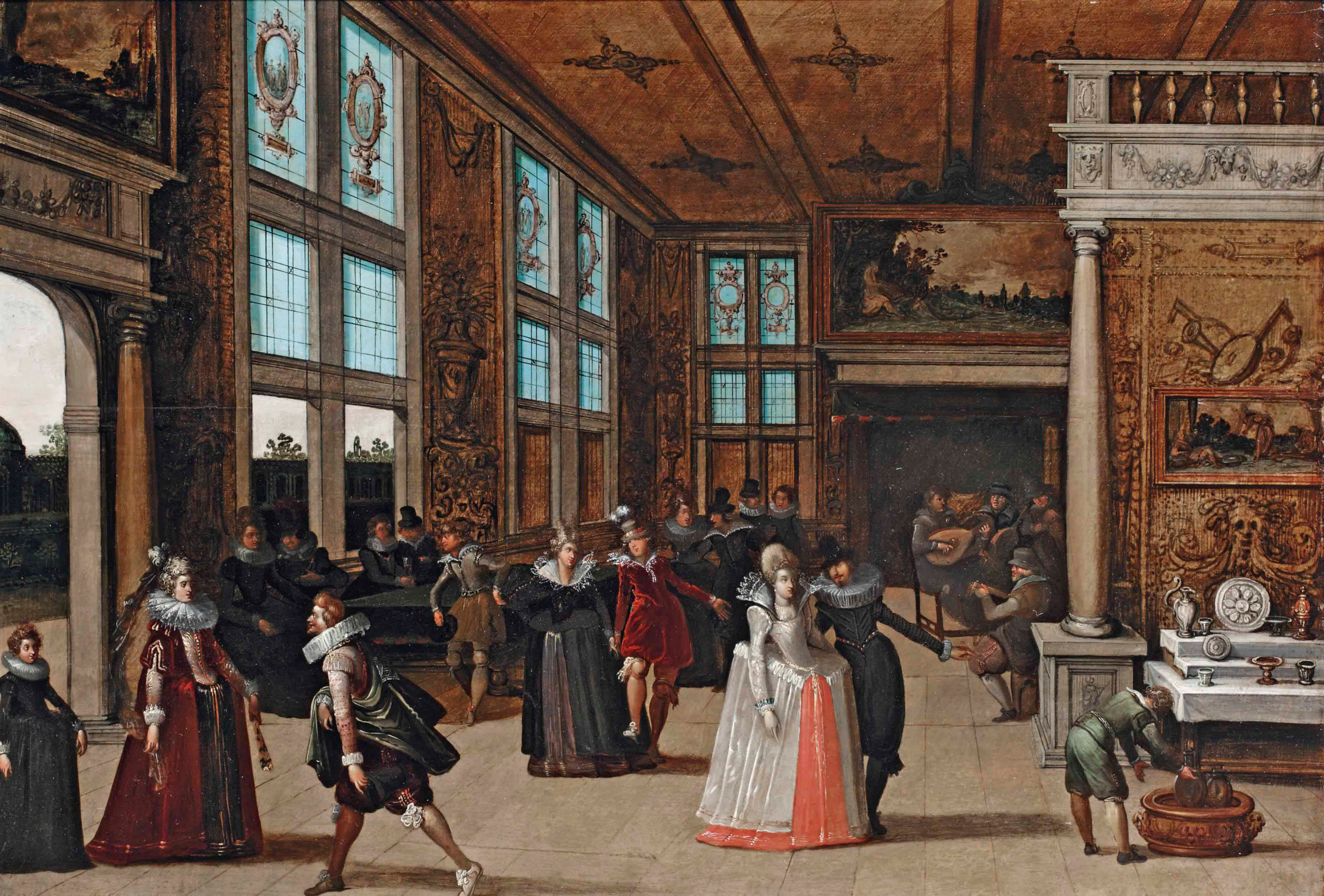
Palace interior with elegant couples courting at a ball

Louis de Caullery, Caulery or Coulery (ca.1580–1621) was a Flemish painter who is known for his architectural scenes, city views, genre scenes, allegorical compositions, religious and history paintings. He was one of the pioneers of the art genre of courtly gatherings and the garden parties (fête champêtre) in Flemish painting.

== Life ==
Details about the life of Louis de Caullery are scarce. He was likely born in Caulery, a small town on the Scheldt river about 18 kilometers south east of the city of Cambrai, at the time situated in the Habsburg Netherlands and now in France. A possible birth in Caulery is bolstered by the fact that his wife and children later inherited some properties in Cambrai. His name is thus possibly derived from his birthplace.

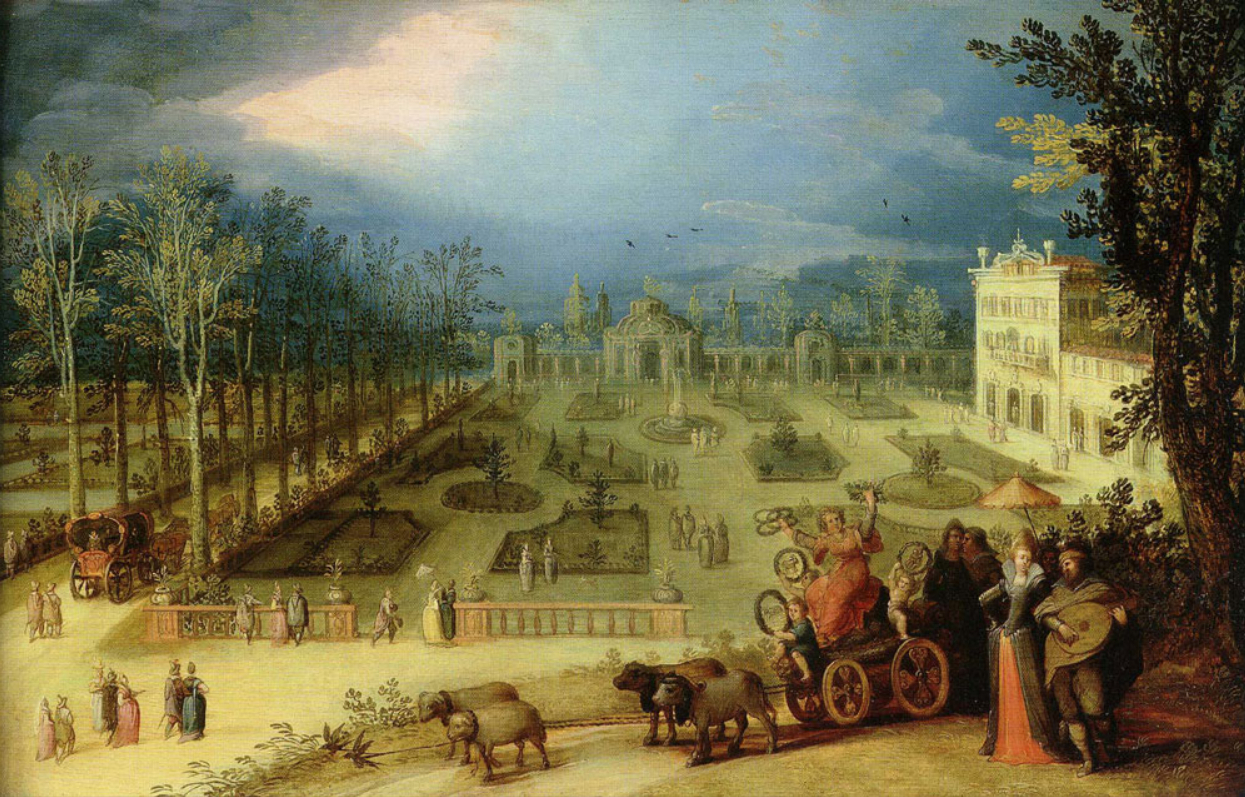
Triumph of Spring

In 1594 he was in Antwerp where he was registered with the local Guild of Saint Luke as the pupil of the prominent Flemish landscape painter Joos de Momper. His name in the register was spelled 'Loys Solleri'. In the guild year 1602/03 he was registered as a master in the Guild under the name 'Lowis de Callory'. In 1608 he had a pupil whose name has not been preserved. He married Maria Adriaenssens, with whom he had several children.

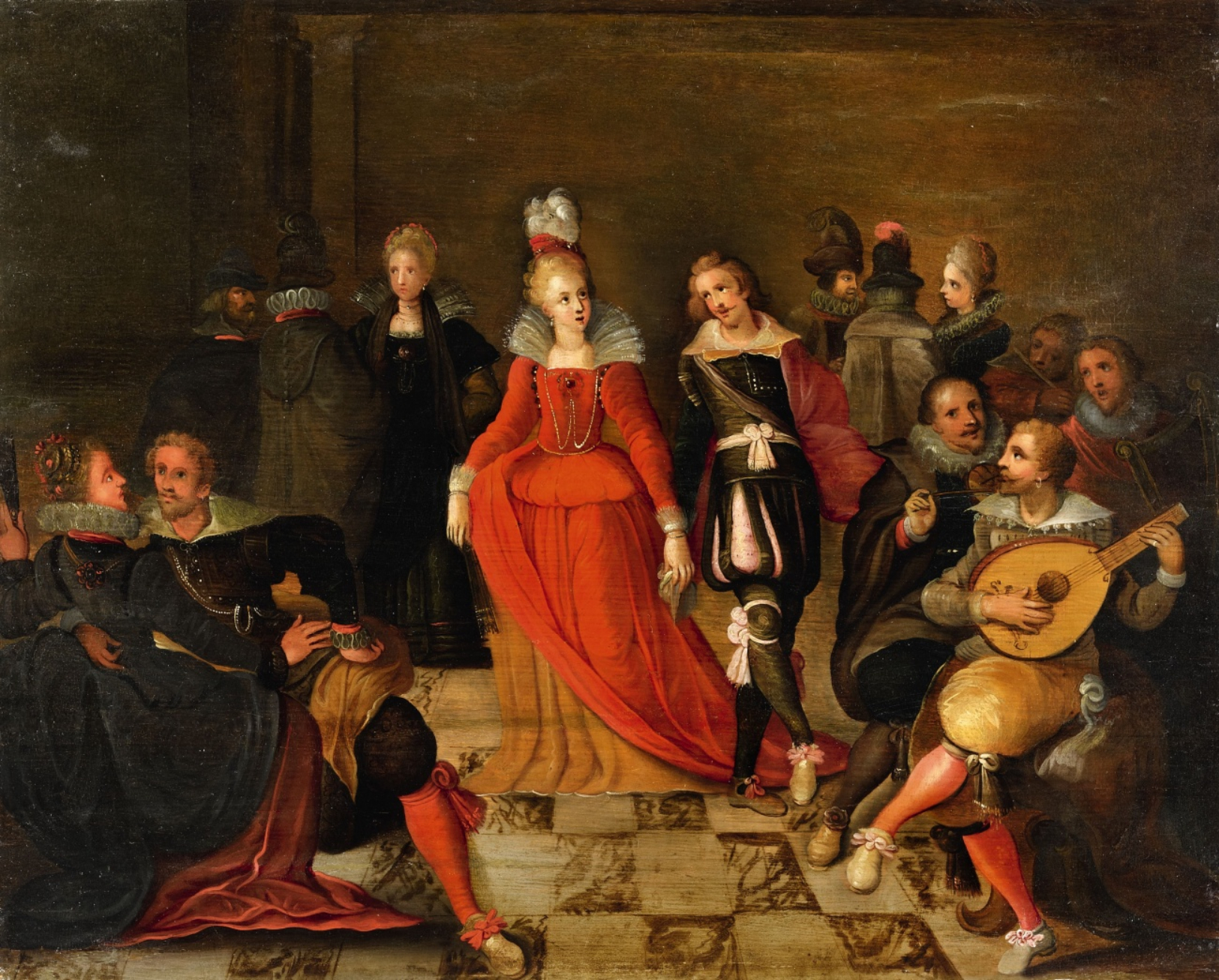
Interior with Merry Company

In the past it was believed that he traveled to Italy to continue his studies, possibly visiting Venice, Florence and Rome. This hypothesis appeared to be supported by the fact that he painted various Italian subjects and his rather innovative use of colour in comparison to artists solely trained in Antwerp. It is now assumed, however, that he did no travel to Italy as there is no evidence for such a trip. The Venetian, Florentine and Romanesque buildings and landscapes in his compositions are likely based on his knowledge of works by masters who did visit Italy.

He seems to have enjoyed quite a success as evidenced by the fact that his works were part of many collections of his time. In 1621 his death duties were paid to the Antwerp Guild of St. Luke. This time his name was spelled in the Guild record as 'Sollery of the Callery'. He therefore likely died in Antwerp in 1620 or 1621.

== Work ==
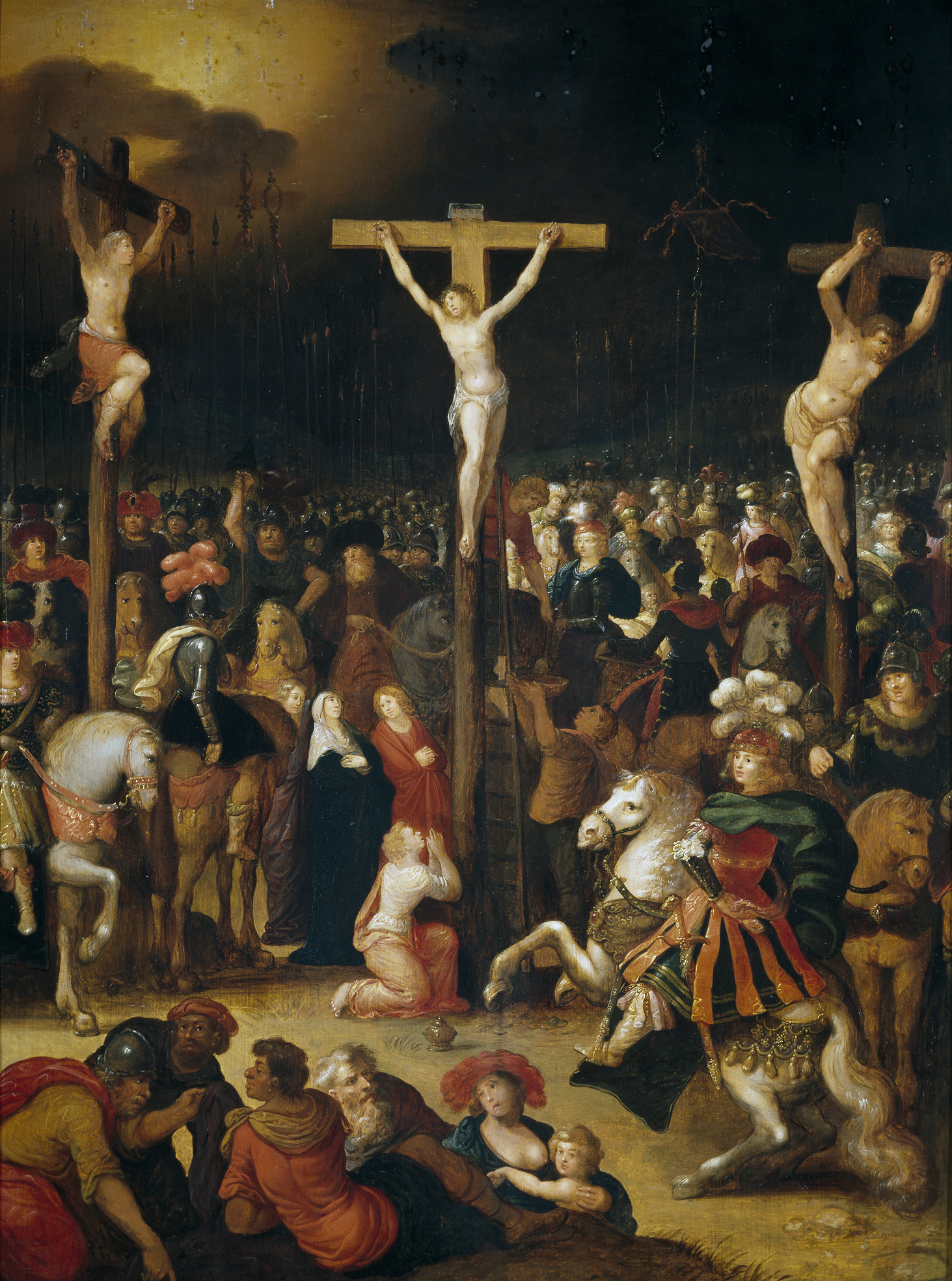
Crucifixion, Prado

Only seven signed paintings by his hand are known. Two of these are fully signed, the Carnival (c. 1615, Hamburger Kunsthalle) and the Party in an interior or The five senses (1620, Louvre collection, on display in the Musée des Beaux-Arts de Cambrai). It is therefore difficult to establish a chronology. In recent years a number of paintings of varying levels of quality have been attributed to him. He painted in a wide range of genres including architectural scenes, city views, genre scenes, allegorical compositions and history paintings. His genre scenes deal with a wide variety of subjects: carnivals on ice, fireworks, bull-fights, outdoor scenes and allegories of the five senses. A frequent theme was that of the indoor or outdoor banquet with large groups of elegant figures foreshadowing the fête champêtre (garden parties) scenes in later French painting. The theme of the garden of love was linked to this and was also developed by other Flemish painters such as Rubens and Frans Francken the Elder. These scenes were painted in the spirit of the Fontainebleau School. The tallness of his figures, their exquisite postures, smooth faces and bare foreheads characterize his style.

Among the religious works are multiple versions of the Crucifixion, showing a keen demand for works on this subject. The versions vary slightly in dimension, the position of various minor subjects, and the quality of the work. The latter shows that these works were made in a workshop with various hands working on different parts of the works. The autograph version of the Crucifixion from which the other versions derive has not been identified.

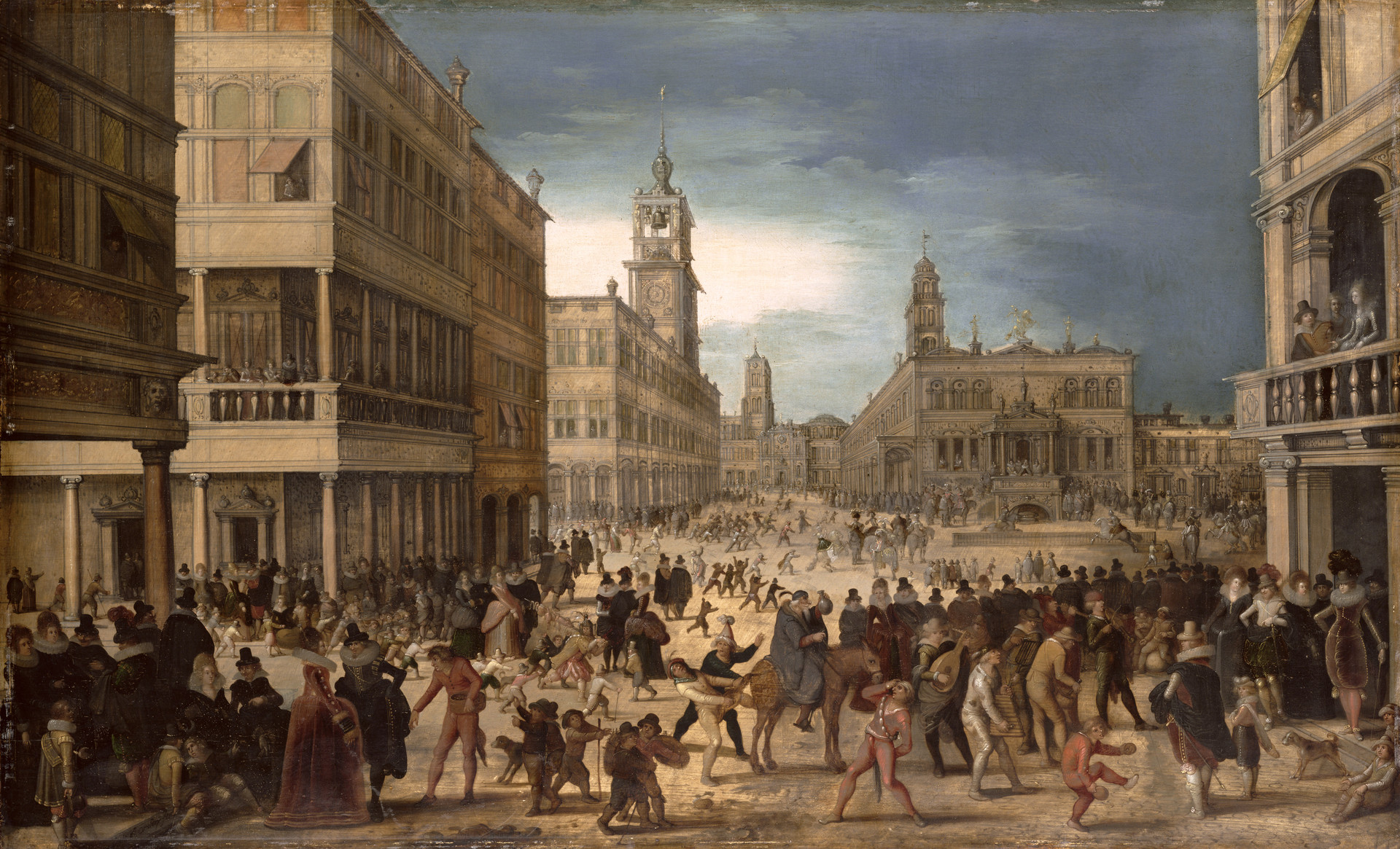
Carnival

He borrowed his figures and compositions freely from other masters, which explains their static appearance. His men usually have thin legs and pointed shoes. The female figures typically have high hairdos, a long neck, a high front, a thin nose, and a small mouth. The faces are not individualised. While these elegant figures were not always depicted in the correct scale, they were still popular with his patrons as well as other artists who copied them in their works. He repeated some of his motifs, such as a stilt walker and a rearing horse. His originality showed in the manner in which he combined the various elements in his compositions.

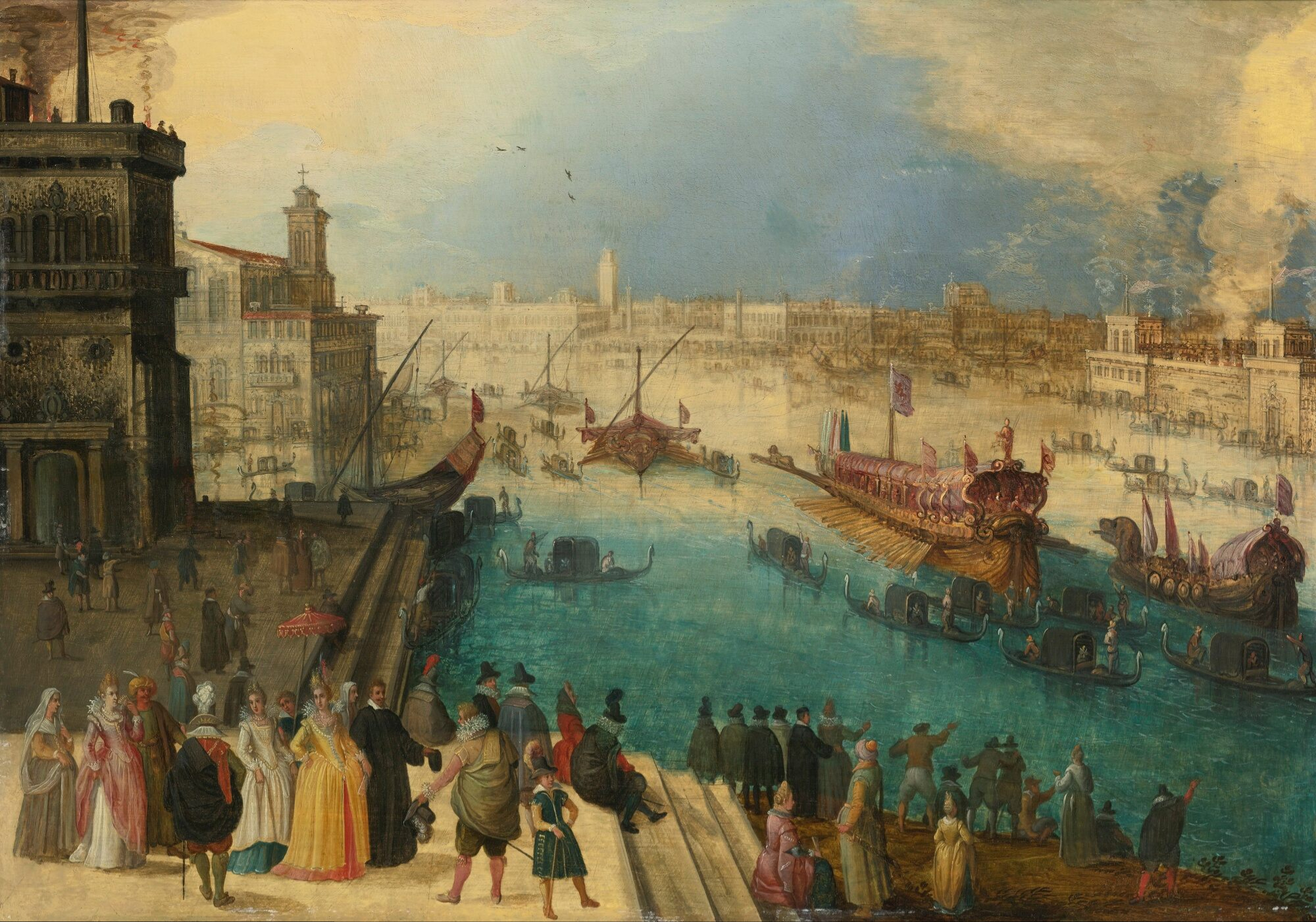
Capriccio view of Venice with the Bucintoro

Under the influence of Italian models, he employed a palette that was innovative for Flanders at that time: half tones, ochre-yellow, Veronese green and Burgundy red. His depiction of buildings shows him to be concerned with fine detail and very skillful at presenting perspective. In his architectural scenes the pictorial space and the settings draw direct inspiration from Hans Vredeman de Vries's designs in the publications Scenographia (1560), Perspective (1604), and Architectura (1507). His cityscapes often depict Italian cities bustling with people engaged in festivities or carnivals; for instance, he painted city views of Rome and Venice and a few views of the Escorial.

He painted a number of allegorical paintings of the seasons. An example is the Triumph of Spring (c. 1615–1620, private collection) He also painted rural landscapes with peasants at work or relaxing after work on the field. These paintings stand in the tradition of Flemish landscape painters such as his master Joos de Momper, Pieter Brueghel the Elder, Marten van Valckenborch and Lucas van Valckenborch and Abel Grimmer and Jacob Grimmer. To create depth he often used a hill in the foreground.

He collaborated with other specialist painters in Antwerp, such as Abraham Govaerts and Frans Francken the Younger on various compositions. An example is the Holy family with angels playing music in which Abraham Govaerts painted the landscape and de Caullery the figures.
