= Anthonie Hals =

Dutch Golden Age painter

- Born: 19 October 1621
- Died: 25 January 1691 (aged 69)

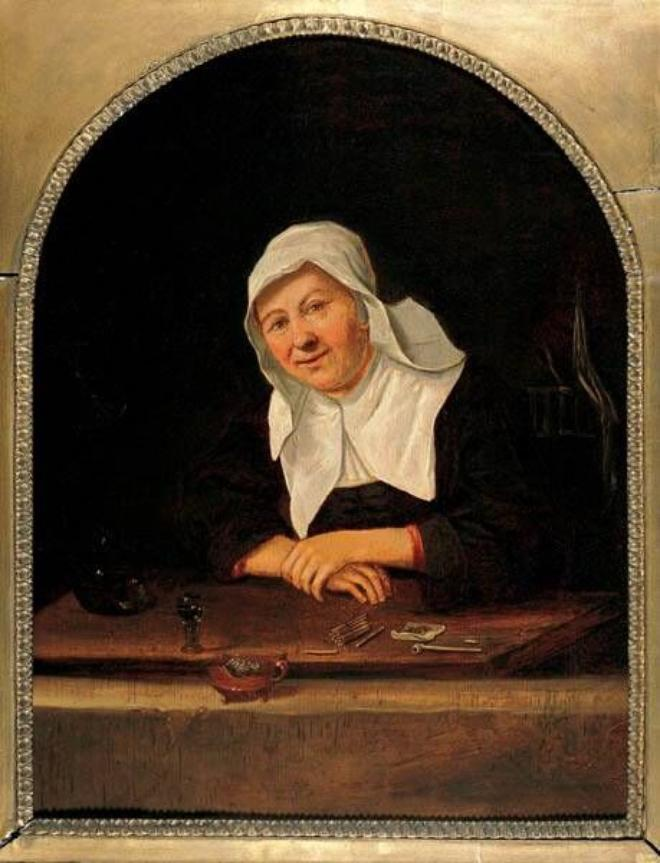
Woman in a window, 1669

Anthonie Hals or Anthony Hals (19 October 1621 – 25 January 1691) was a Dutch Golden Age painter from the Dutch Republic and the son of Dirck Hals.

He was born in Haarlem and was first taught by his father. He moved to Amsterdam in 1652 and married there in 1654 with his cousin Reynier Hals as his witness. He is known for portraits and genre works.
