= Willem Pieterszoon Buytewech =

Painter and engraver from the Northern Netherlands

Willem Buytewech
- Willem Pieterszoon Buytewech
- Born: Willem Pieterszoon Buytewech; 1591/2; Rotterdam
- Died: 23 September 1624; Rotterdam
- Known for: Painting
- Movement: Baroque

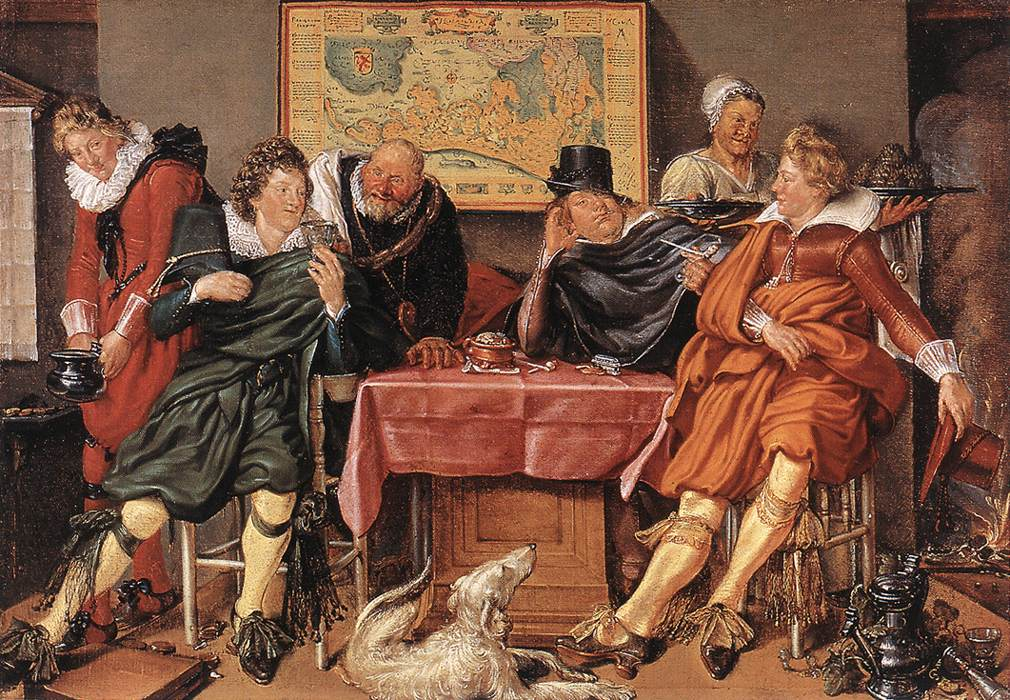
Willem Buytewech's Merry Company 1620

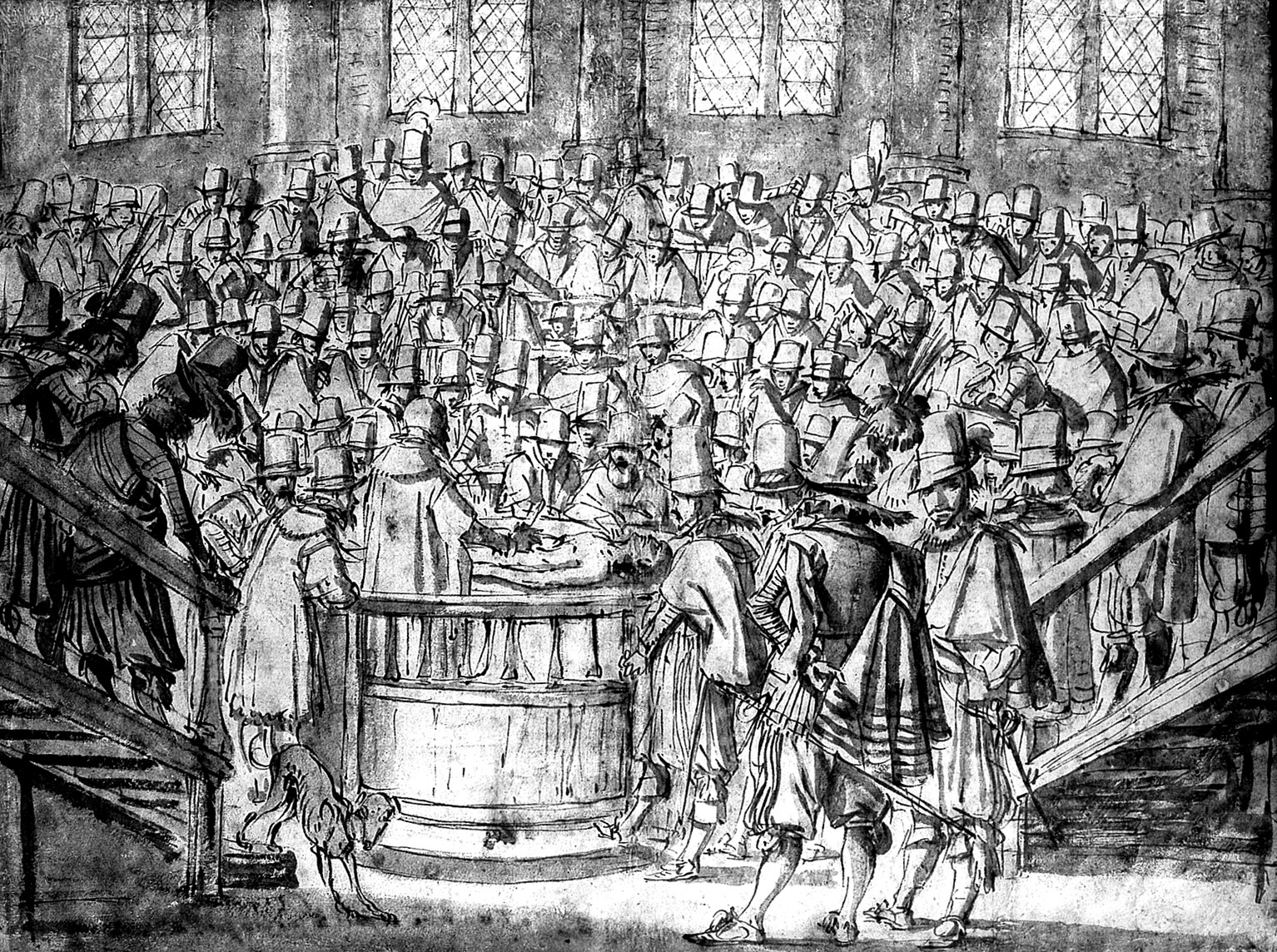
The Leiden anatomical theatre during a dissection.

Willem Pieterszoon (abbr. Pietersz.) Buytewech (1591/'92 – 23 September 1624) was a Dutch Golden Age painter, draughtsman and etcher. He is one of the early specialists in the merry company type of subject in Dutch genre painting. His contemporaries named him “Gheestige Willem” (Jolly or spirited William).

== Biography ==
Buytewech was born and died in Rotterdam. He was the son of Pieter Jacobsz, a cobbler and candlemaker. He learned his trade in Haarlem, where he became a member of the artists' guild (Haarlem Guild of St. Luke) in 1612, together with Hercules Segers and Esaias van de Velde. Frans Hals, who was a member of this guild since 1610, had much influence on Buytenwech's work, as shown by the many drawings that the latter made after Hals's paintings. After his marriage on 10 November 1613, with Aeltje van Amerongen, of a patrician family, he returned to Rotterdam. There Hendrik Martenszoon Sorgh was one of his pupils.

Buytewech was primarily a graphic artist, mostly of landscapes and genre pieces, but occasionally also of biblical and allegorical themes. Of his paintings only eight have survived to this date, all genre pieces, most depicting merry companies. Merry Company on a Terrace (1616) is in the collection of the Mauritshuis, the Hague. Merry Company (1620) is in the Museum Boijmans Van Beuningen in Rotterdam.

He died at age 32 or 33 of unrecorded causes. His son Willem Willemsz. Buytewech (1625–1670), born after his death, would become a painter as well. It is suggested that Herman van Swanevelt could have been his pupil.
