= Claude Gillot =

French painter (1673–1722)

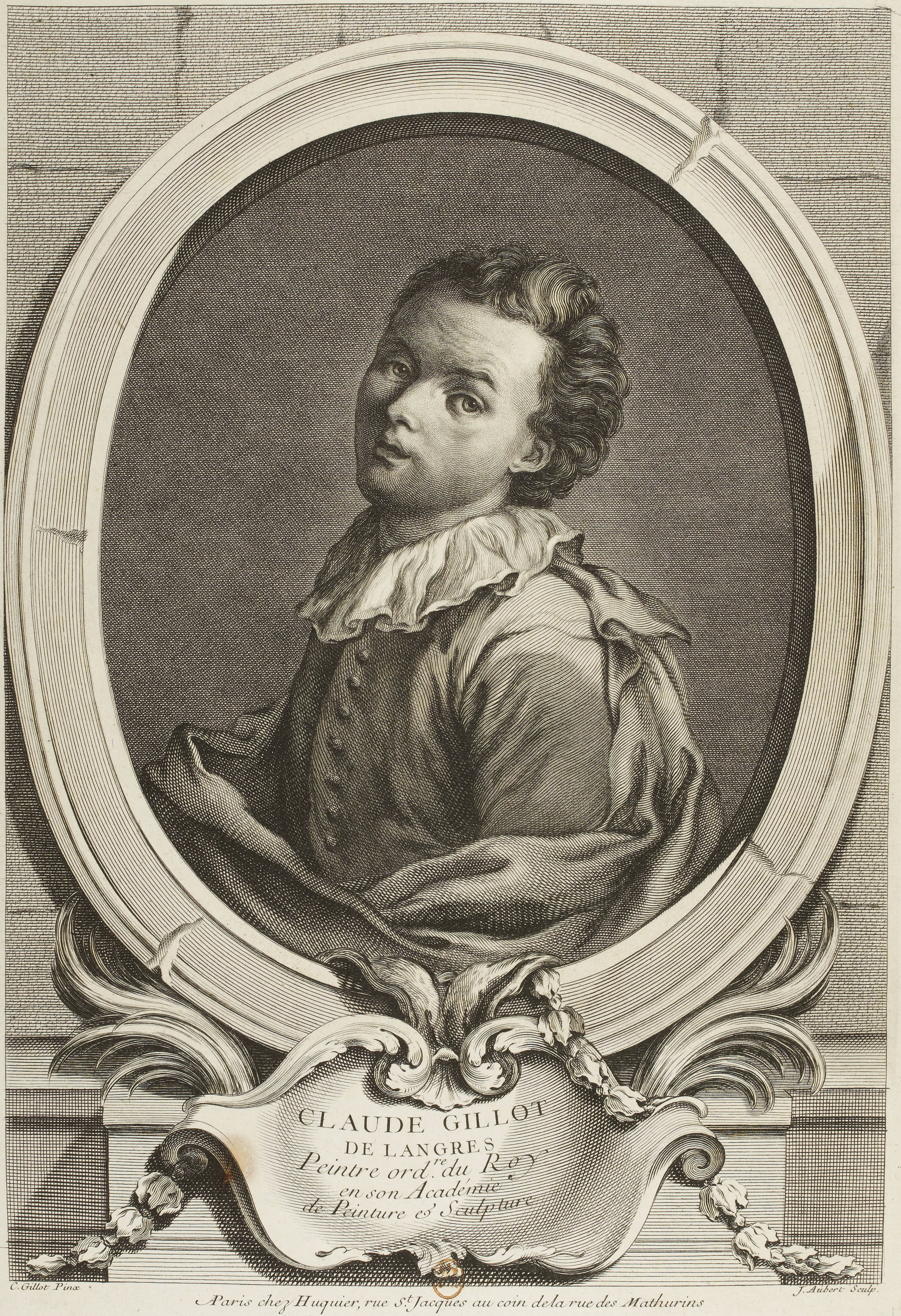
Jean Aubert's engraving of Gillot's self-portrait, c. 1720

Claude Gillot (English: /ʒɪˈloʊ/ zhee-LOH, French: [klod ʒilo]; April 27, 1673 – May 4, 1722) was a French painter, printmaker, and illustrator, best known as the master of Watteau and Lancret.

== Life ==
Gillot was born in Langres. He was a painter, engraver, book illustrator, metal worker, and designer for the theater. He had Watteau as an apprentice between 1703 and 1708.

Gillot's sportive mythological landscape pieces, with such titles as Feast of Pan and Feast of Bacchus, opened the Academy of Painting at Paris to him in 1715; and he then adapted his art to the fashionable tastes of the day, and introduced the decorative fêtes champêtres, in which he was afterwards surpassed by his pupils, though Gillot's examples usually lack the contemporary dress of Watteau's. His paintings often include characters from the commedia dell'arte, a taste he passed on to Watteau. Gillot was also closely connected with the opera and theatre as a designer of scenery and costumes. He died in Paris, aged 49.

== Gallery ==
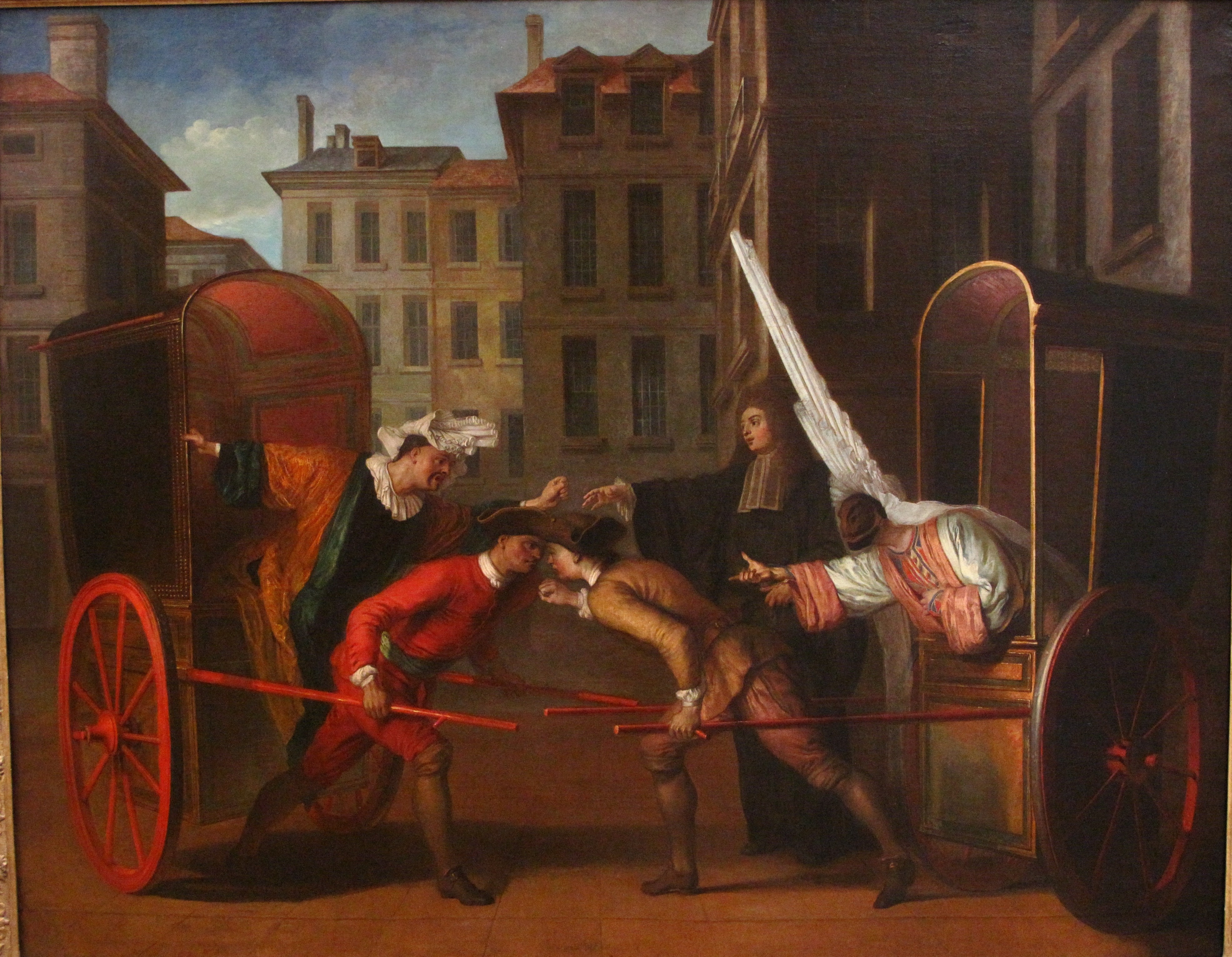
Les Deux Carrosses, 1707, oil on canvas, Louvre, Paris

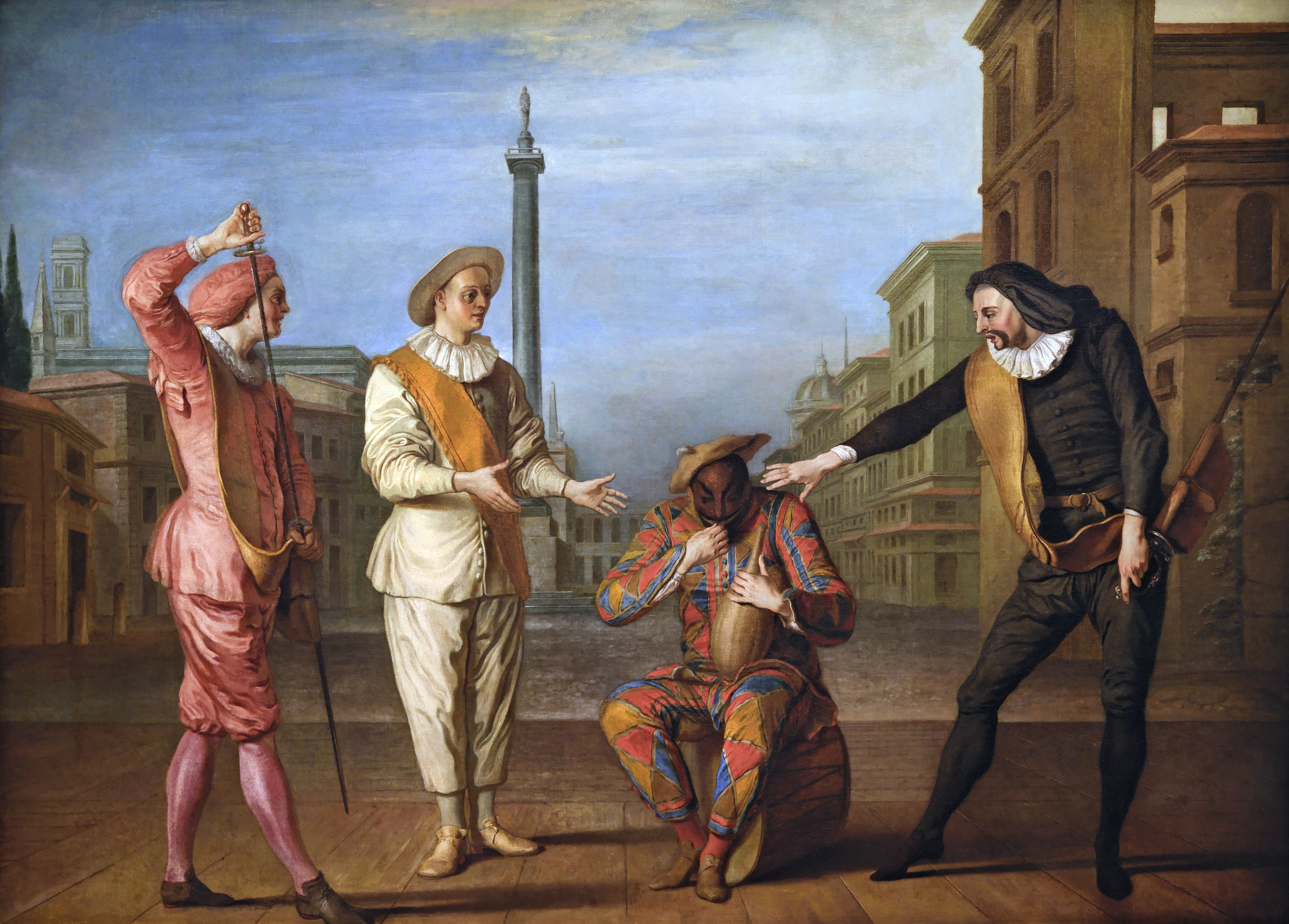
Le tombeau de Maître André, ca. 1716–1717, oil on canvas, Louvre, Paris

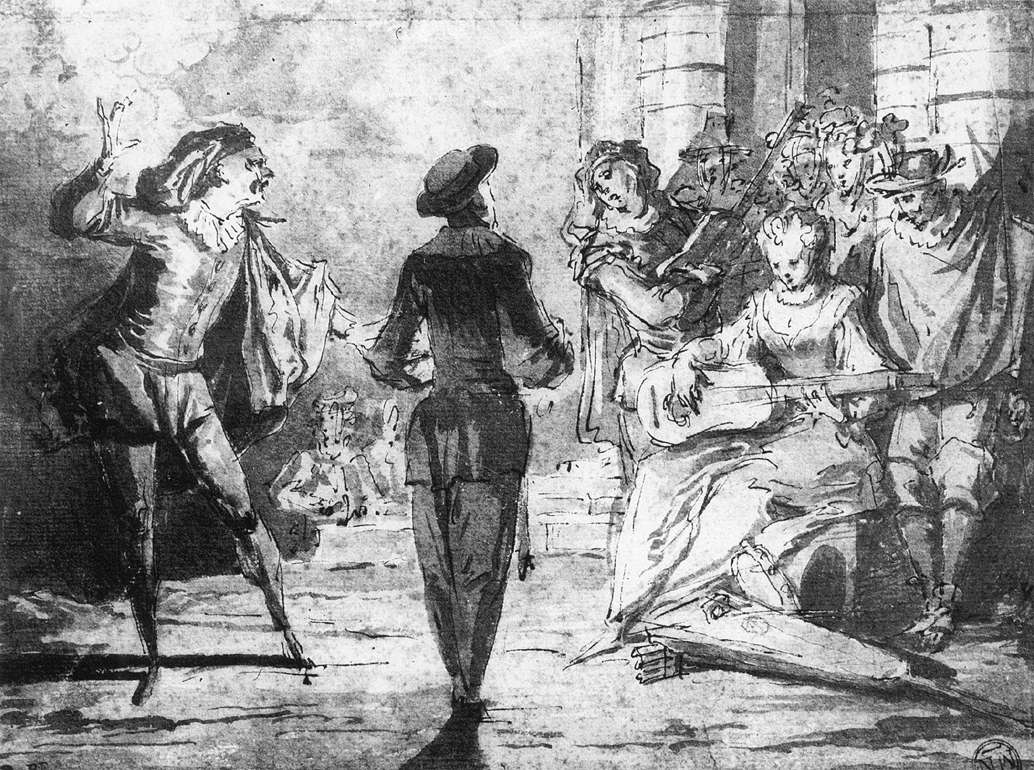
Scene from "Jupiter curieux impertinent", pen drawing, Louvre, Paris

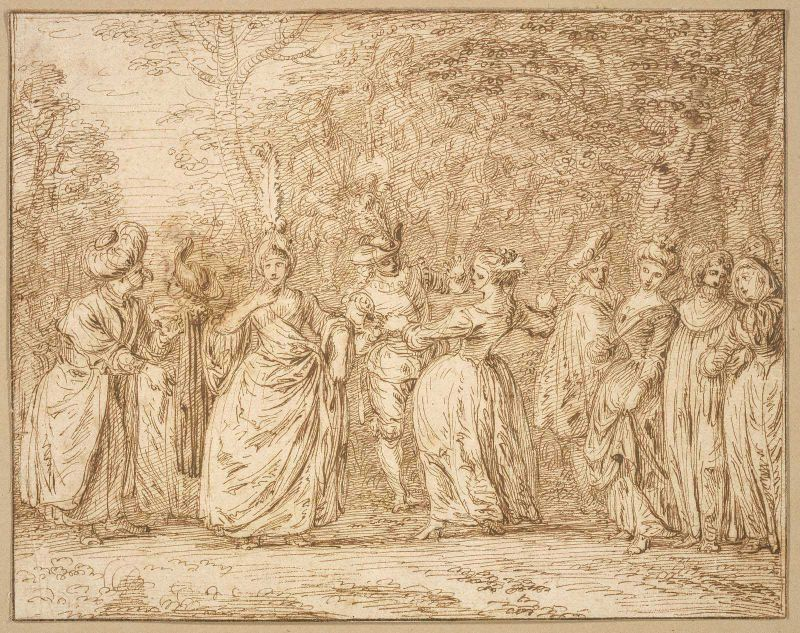
Mascarade, pen and brown ink drawing, Museum of Fine Arts, Boston
