= Merry company =

Term in art history for a painting showing a small group of people enjoying themselves

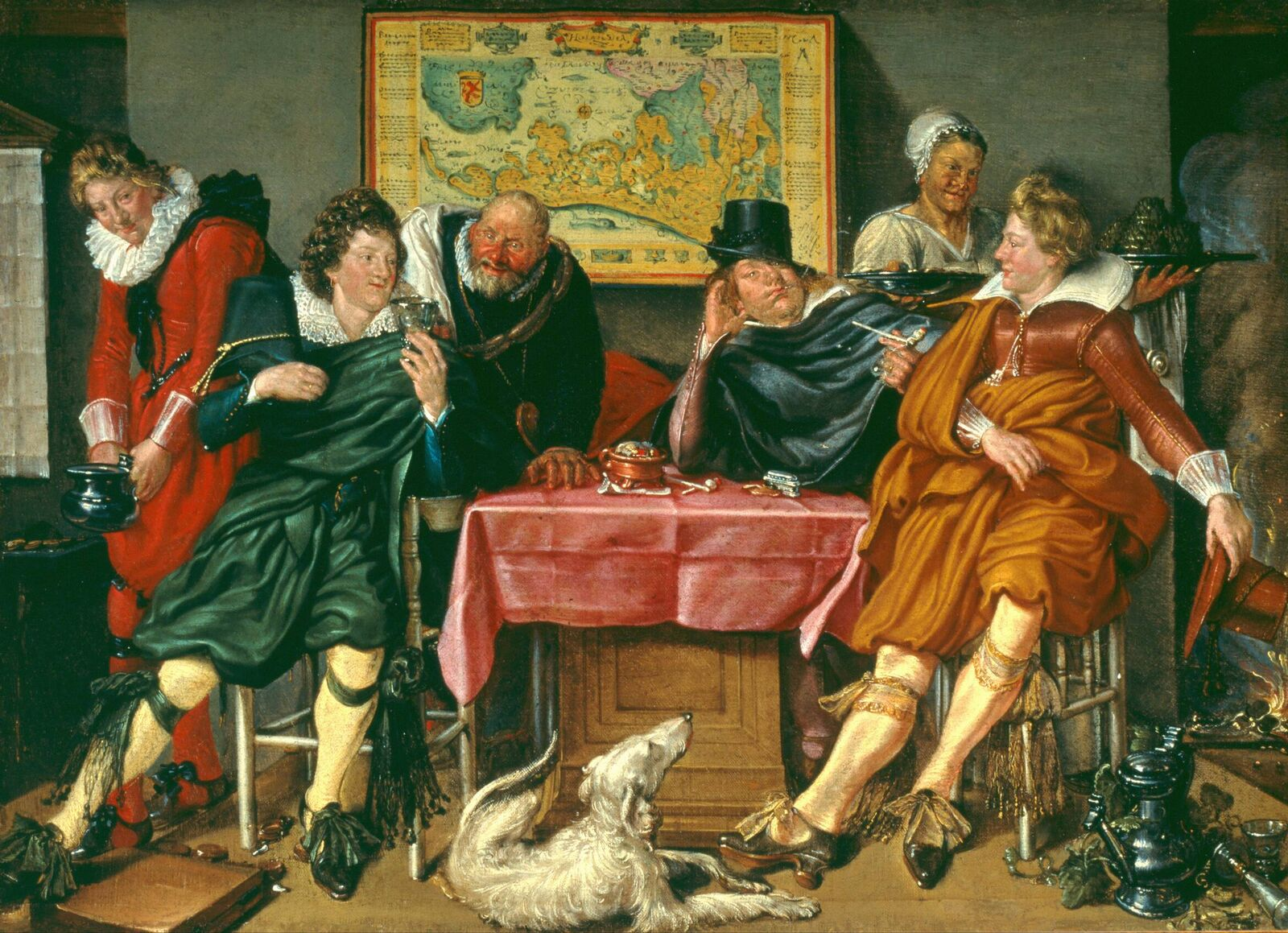
Willem Pietersz. Buytewech, Merry Company, c. 1620, apart from the maid an all-male group

Merry company is the term in art history for a painting, usually from the 17th century, showing a small group of people enjoying themselves, usually seated with drinks, and often music-making. These scenes are a very common type of genre painting of the Dutch Golden Age and Flemish Baroque; it is estimated that nearly two thirds of Dutch genre scenes show people drinking.

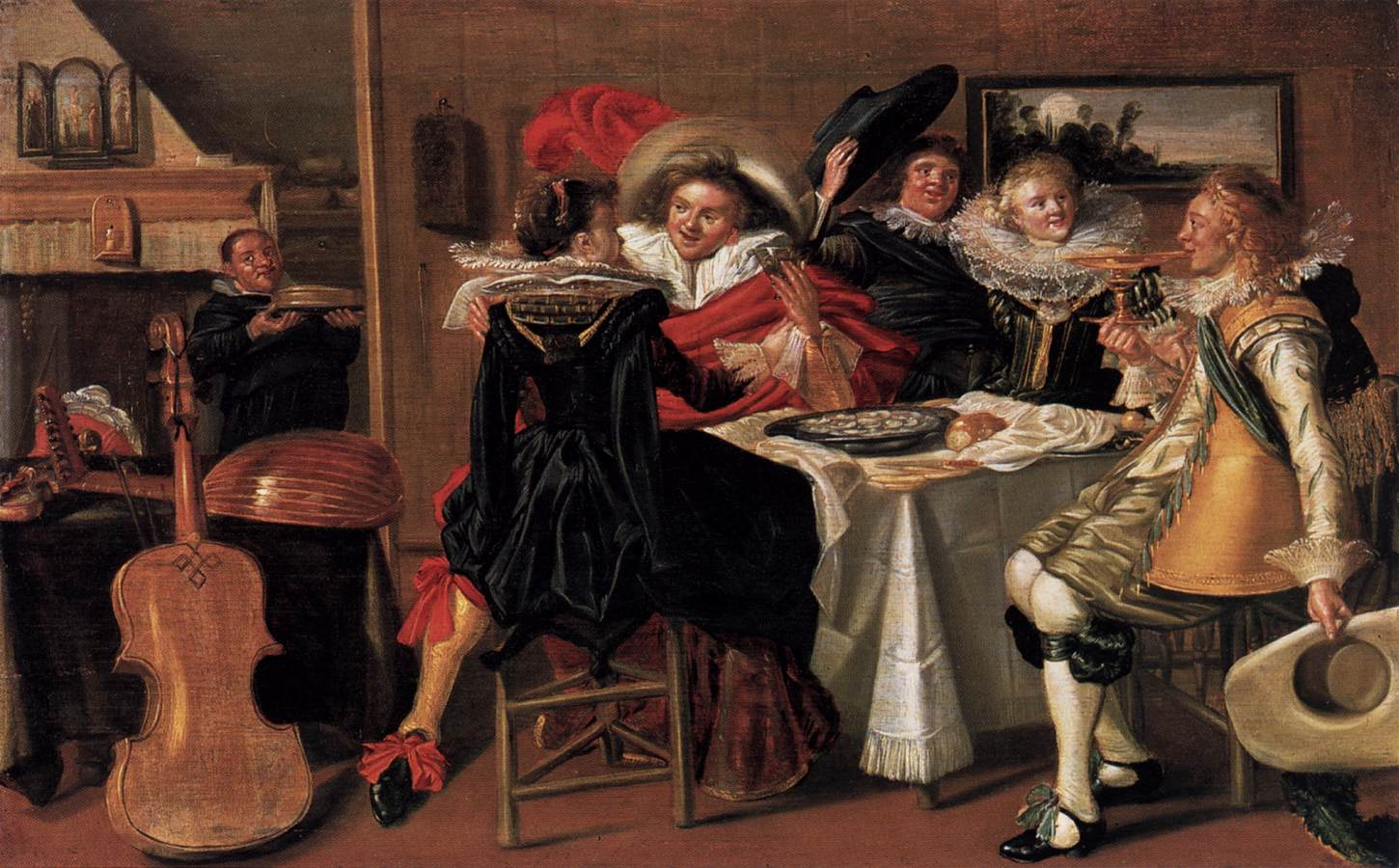
Dirck Hals, Merry Company at Table, 1627–1629

The term is the usual translation of the Dutch geselschapje, or vrolijk gezelschap, and is capitalized when used as a title for a work, and sometimes as a term for the type. The scenes may be set in the home, a garden, or a tavern, and the gatherings range from decorous groups in wealthy interiors to groups of drunk men with prostitutes. Gatherings that are relatively decorous and expensively dressed, with similar numbers of men and women, often standing, may be called Elegant Company or Gallant Company, while those showing people who are clearly peasants are more likely to use that word in their title. Such subjects in painting are most common in Dutch art between about 1620 and 1670.

== Scope of the term ==
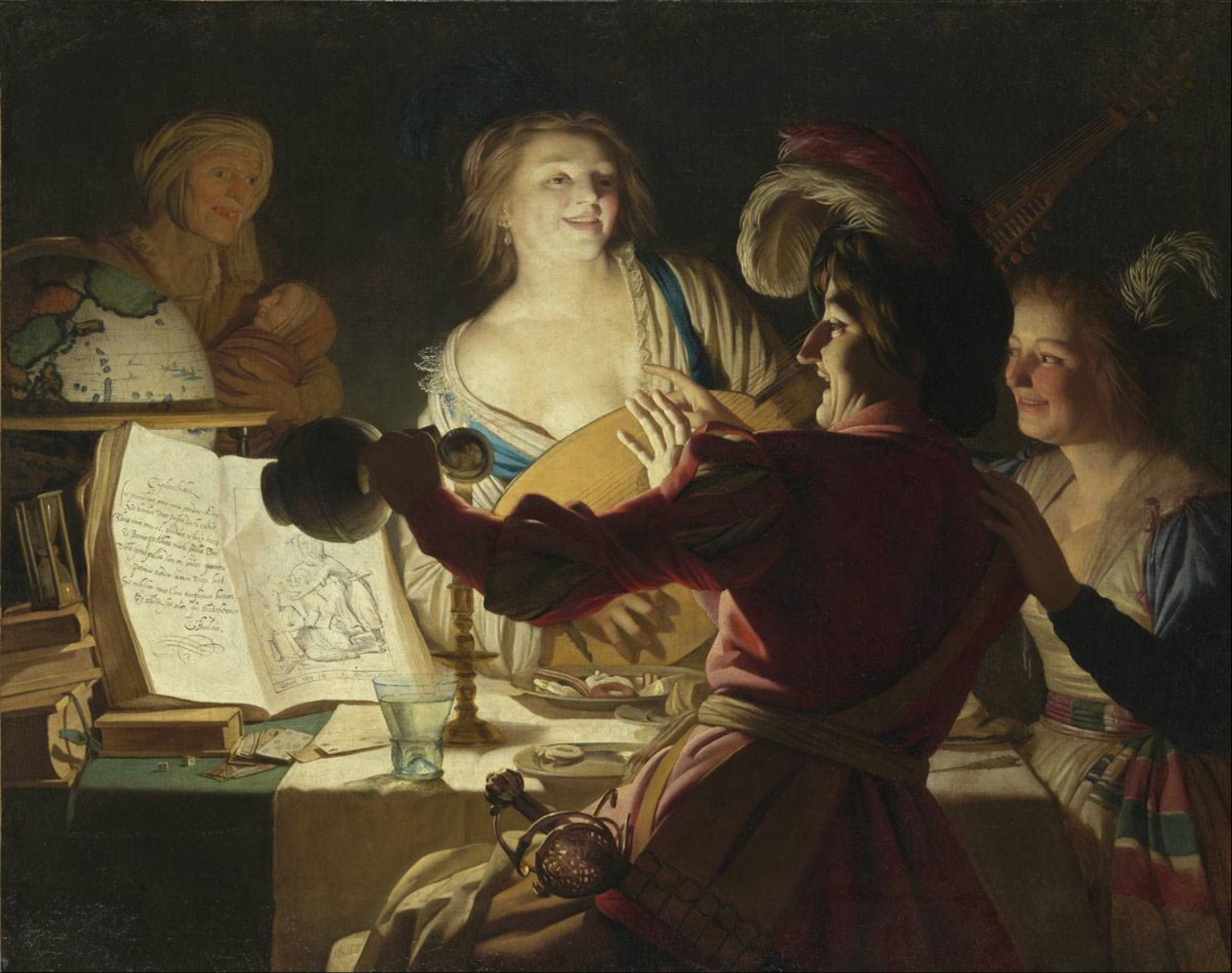
Prostitution is clearly indicated in this scene by Gerard van Honthorst of 1623, complete with aged procuress, low cleavage, and a feathered headdress on the second girl.

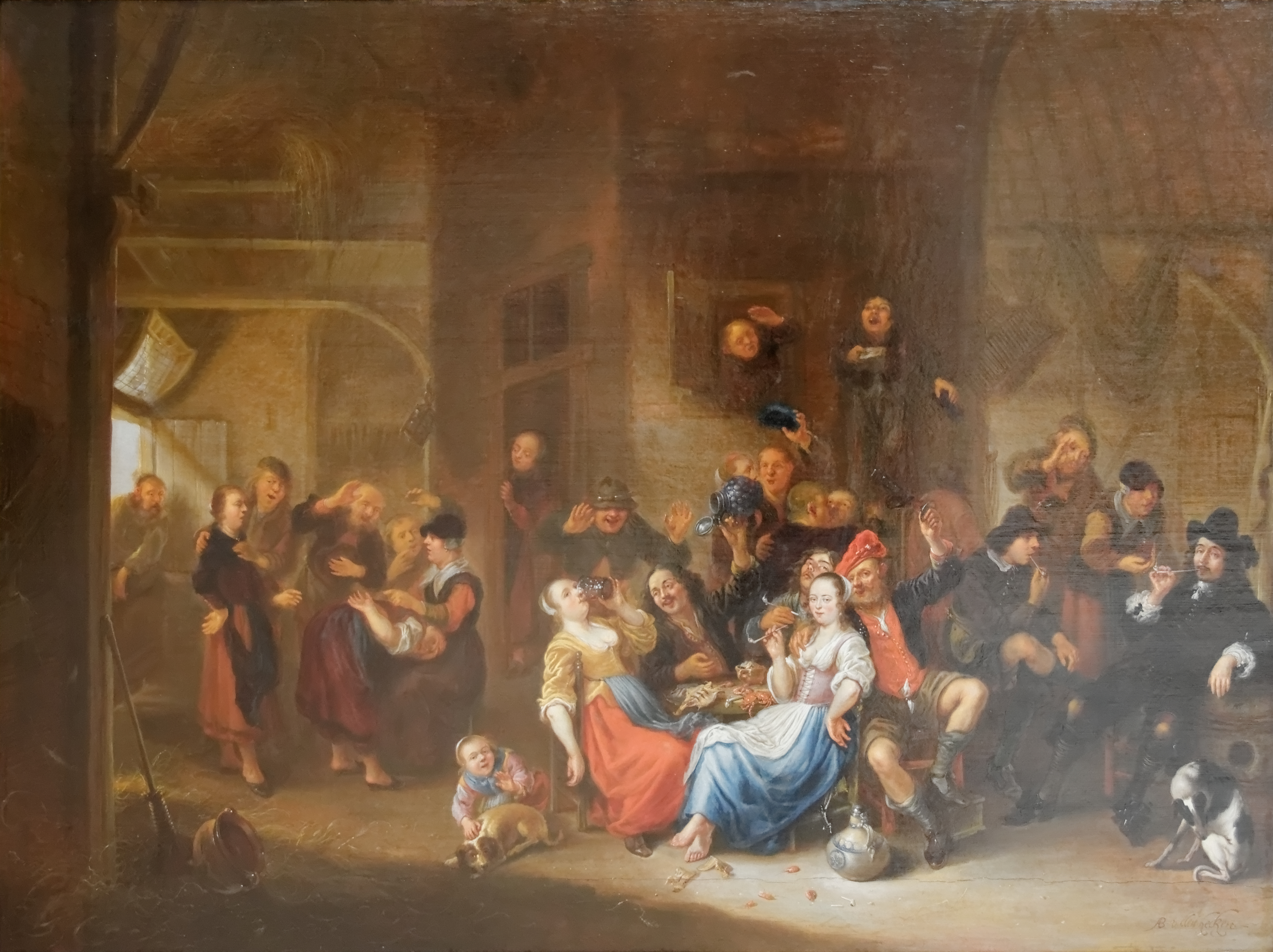
Abraham van den Hecken, A Merry Company in a Tavern, 1640s

The definition of a "merry company" is far from rigid, and overlaps with several other types of painting. Portraits of family groups or bodies such as militia companies may borrow an informal style of composition from them, but works where the figures were intended to represent specific individuals are excluded. There are normally between four and about a dozen figures shown, which typically includes both men and women, but may just consist of men, perhaps with female servants, as in the Buytewech illustrated. Contemporary Dutch descriptions of paintings from inventories, auction catalogues and the like, use (no doubt somewhat arbitrarily) other terms for similar compositions including "a buitenpartij (an outdoor party or picnic), a cortegaarddje (a barrack-room or guardroom scene), a borddeeltjen (a bordello scene), and a beeldeken or moderne beelden (a picture with little figures or modern figures)".

"Musical party" or "concert" is often used when some of the main figures are playing instruments. More generally such works may be referred to as "company paintings" or "company subjects" (but this is not to be confused with Indian Company painting, a style patronized by the British East India Company). Few if any titles used for 17th century genre paintings can be traced to the artist; those used by museums and art historians today may derive from a record in the provenance or be made up in modern times.

Paintings showing specific celebrations such as weddings or the festivities for Twelfth Night, the main mid-winter celebration in the Netherlands, or the playing of specific games, are likely to have titles relating to these where the subject is still clear. For example, a painting by Godfried Schalcken (1665–1670, Royal Collection) is known from his biography by his pupil Arnold Houbraken to represent The game of 'Lady, Come into the Garden', and is so titled, although the rules of this are now unknown but "clearly involved the removal of clothes", at least by some male participants. In La Main Chaud ("the hot hand") male participants just got smacked. Paintings showing the parable of the Prodigal Son in his prodigal phase are conceived as merry company scenes of the brothel type, though they are often larger, as was expected of a history painting.

== Interpretation ==
As with other types of Netherlandish genre painting, the body of merry company paintings include some with a clear moralistic intention, carrying a message to avoid excess in drink, lavish spending, low company and fornication. Others seem merely to celebrate the pleasures of sociability, often with a socially aspirational element. Many fall somewhere in between, are hard to interpret, and "contain within them an obvious contradiction between their goal of condemning certain types of excessive behaviour and the amusing and attractive aspect of this very behaviour and its representation".

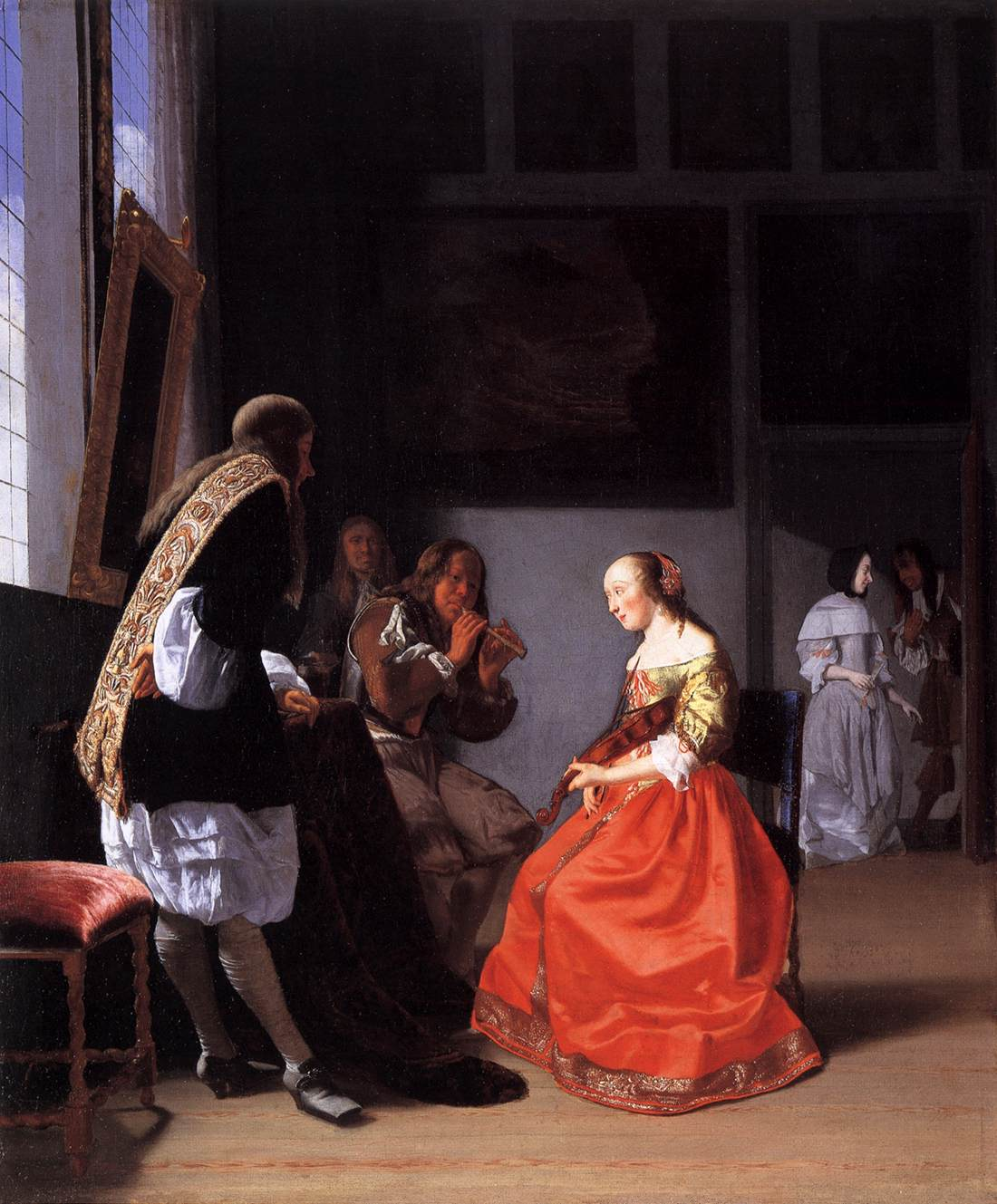
Jacob Ochtervelt, Musical Company in an Interior, c. 1670. A row of portraits hang at the top of the back wall.

Often the art historian wishing to interpret them has first to decide such questions as whether the scene is placed in a home, a tavern or a brothel, and if a tavern whether the women present are respectable or prostitutes, or whether the artist had an intention to convey definite meaning to his contemporary viewers on these questions at all. The titles given later to paintings often distinguish between "taverns" or "inns" and "brothels", but in practice these were very often the same establishments, as many taverns had rooms above or behind set aside for sexual purposes: "Inn in front; brothel behind" was a Dutch proverb.

Scenes with prostitutes do not reflect the realities of 17th century prostitution in many ways, but offer a conventionalized visual code. The madam or (as art historians like to call them) "procuress" is always an aged crone, whereas court records for Amsterdam (the national centre for Dutch prostitution) show that most were still fairly young, and 40% in their twenties. The presence of a procuress figure is by itself sufficient to justify interpreting a painting as a brothel scene.

Fine clothes (rented from the madam) and in particular feathers in headdresses are said to be signifiers of prostitutes, as well as the more obvious loosened clothes, low cleavages, and a provocative frontal stance. But in the later part of the century demure downcast looks by the woman feature in many scenes thought to represent prostitution; in the famously ambiguous threesome The Gallant Conversation by Gerard ter Borch, the young woman is seen only from behind. Of one painting by Jacob Ochtervelt, (c. 1670, now Cleveland, illustrated at left) Wayne Franits says:

At first glance, the Musical Company in an Interior appears to be an elegant gathering of well-heeled youths [and women and a servant]... The picture exudes an aura of calmness and finesse. Nevertheless, the series of female portraits on the wall behind the figures discloses the true nature of its subject. There is strong evidence that actual brothels displayed portraits like these to assist clients in selecting their partners.

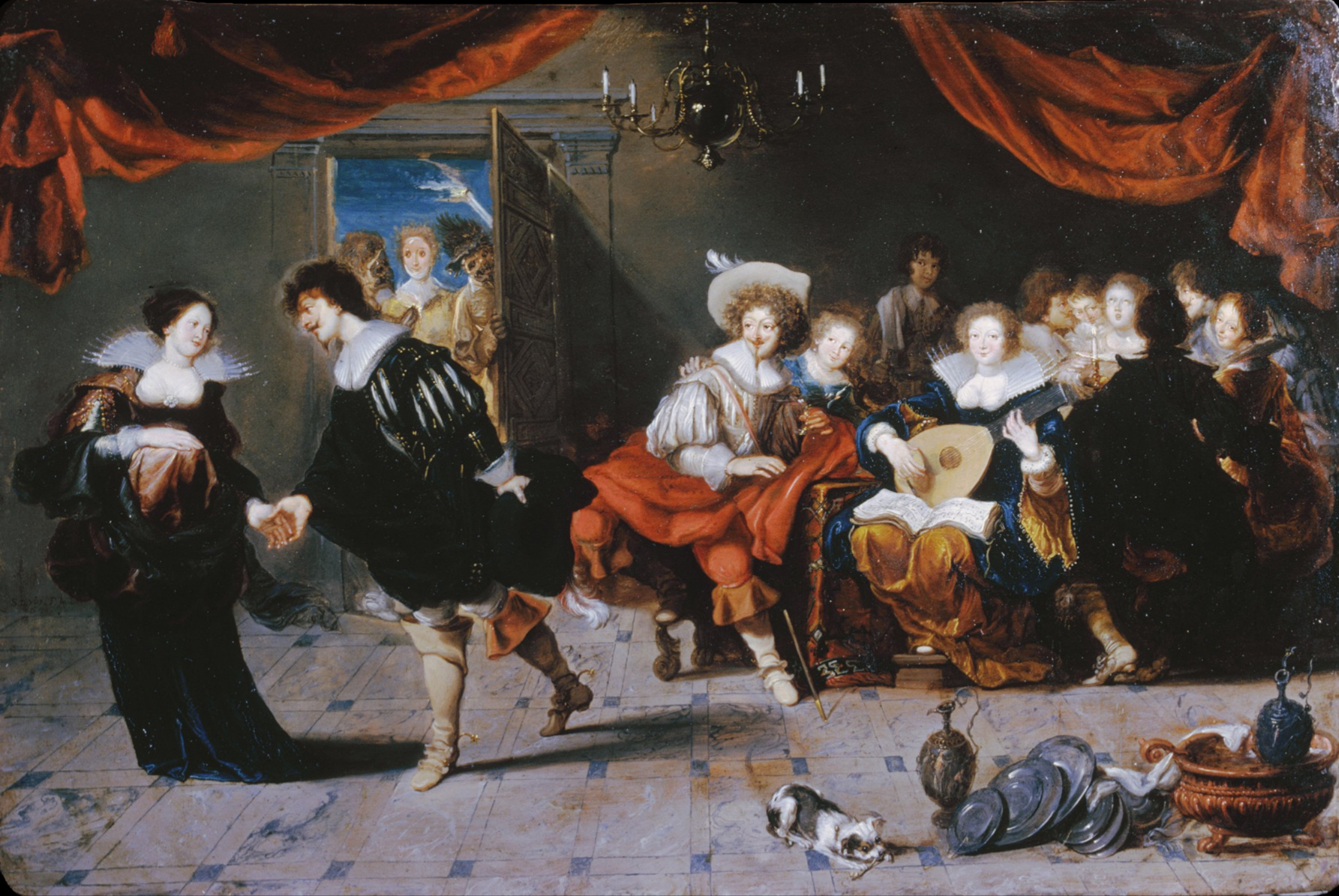
Simon de Vos, 1630s; according to the owning museum "Well-bred young ladies did not join parties in public inns; these smiling women are prostitutes".

According to Simon Schama,

...when we are unsure whether we are looking at a picture of a home or a tavern, or whether what seems to be a tavern is actually a brothel, it may not be because we lack hard-and-fast clues to the artist's unambiguous intention, but because he meant us to be unsure. ... It would be futile to attempt to distinguish between scenes of good homely fun and public-house dissipation, because the figurative and actual territories were themselves deliberately mixed up. Where goings-on take place in a household or, conversely, children run around with gleeful worldliness in a tavern, there is a good chance that the picture is about the conmingling of innocence and corruption.

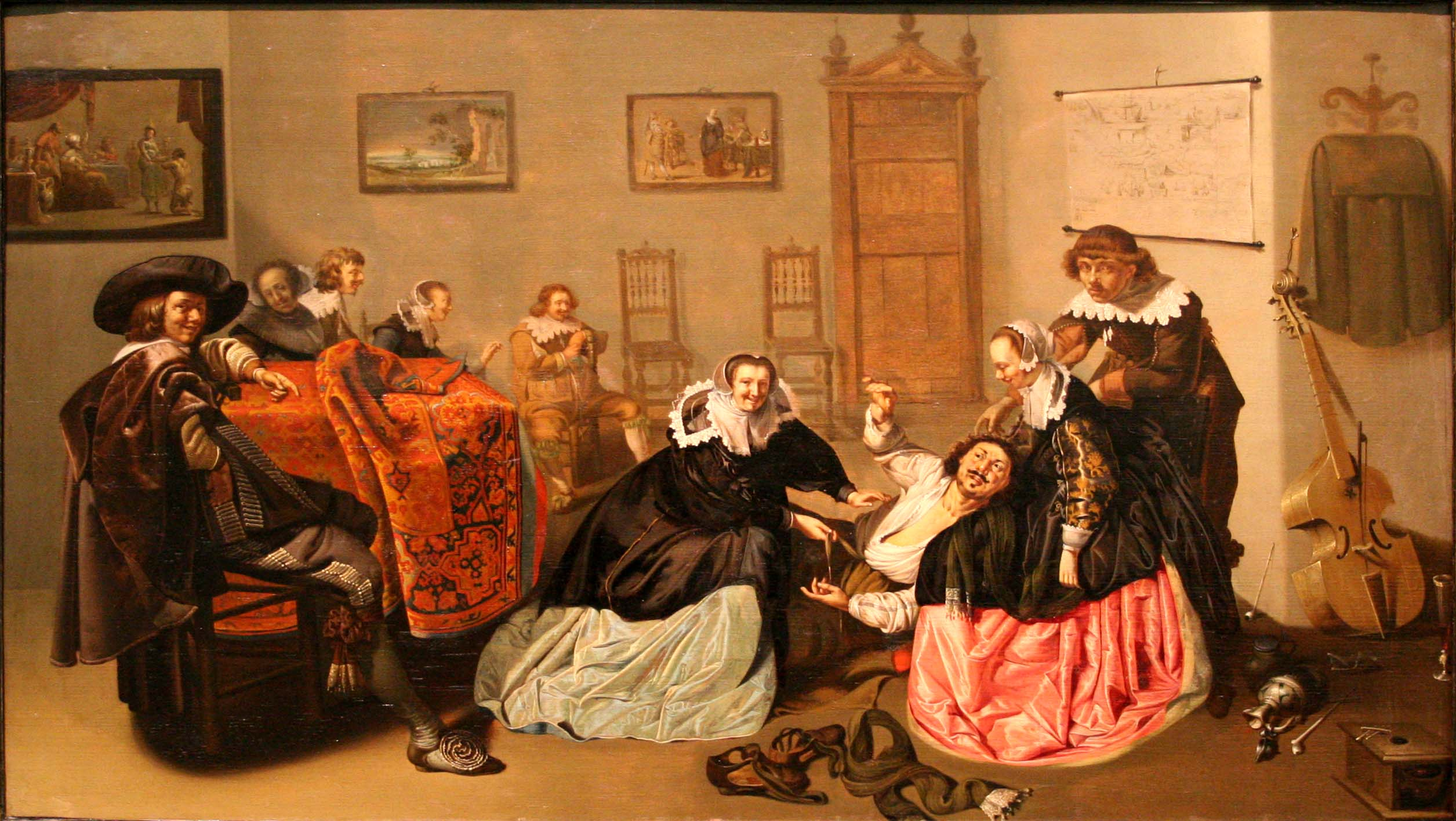
Jacob Duck, 1635-40

Jan Steen owned a tavern for a period, living on the premises, and often included portraits of himself and members of his family in "genre" works. Gerrit van Honthorst, who painted several scenes that, like the one illustrated here, clearly do show prostitution, married the daughter of the proprietress of a tavern and a wine merchant, who was a distant cousin and something of an heiress. The traditional interpretation and title of his Prodigal Son in Munich has been challenged, with the assertion that it merely shows a "festive" tavern scene, despite the presence of an older woman and feathers in the girls' hair, often taken as diagnostic of a brothel scene.

Elmer Kolfin, in "the first comprehensive study to date on the merry company in Dutch art during the first half of the seventeenth century" divides the pictures "into three iconographic categories: "idealistic", which present mainly positive views of the festive activities depicted; "moralistic", in which such activities are condemned from a moral point of view; and "satirical", in which they are held up for ridicule, but chiefly for comic rather than moralizing effect" seeing a movement away from moralistic to idealistic treatments from the 16th to the 17th century.

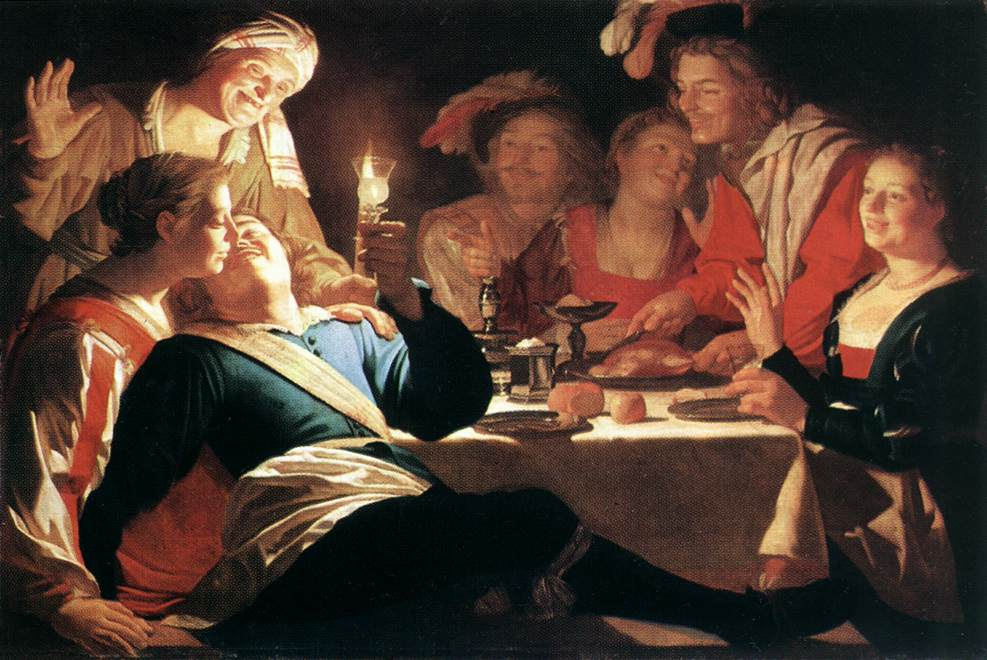
Gerrit van Honthorst, Prodigal Son or Merry Company, 1622

Other scholars see a large group of paintings as deliberately ambiguous or open in their meaning; the limited evidence we have suggests they were often displayed in the main rooms of their owners' houses.

The exceptional freedom allowed to Dutch women amazed and usually horrified foreign visitors; according to the visiting Englishman Fynes Moryson:

... mothers of good fame permit their daughters at home after they themselves go to bed, to sit up with young men all or most part of the night, banqueting and talking, yea with leave and without leave to walk abroad with young men in the streets by night. And this they do out of a customed liberty without prejudice to their fame whereas the Italian women, strictly kept, think it folly to omit every opportunity they can get to do ill.

Many paintings have lightly worn allegorical schemes; a plate of food, tobacco pipe, musical instrument and a squeeze, kiss or slap will be enough to make any group into an Allegory of the Five Senses. Many may illustrate the endless supply of moralistic Dutch proverbs.

== Development of the type ==
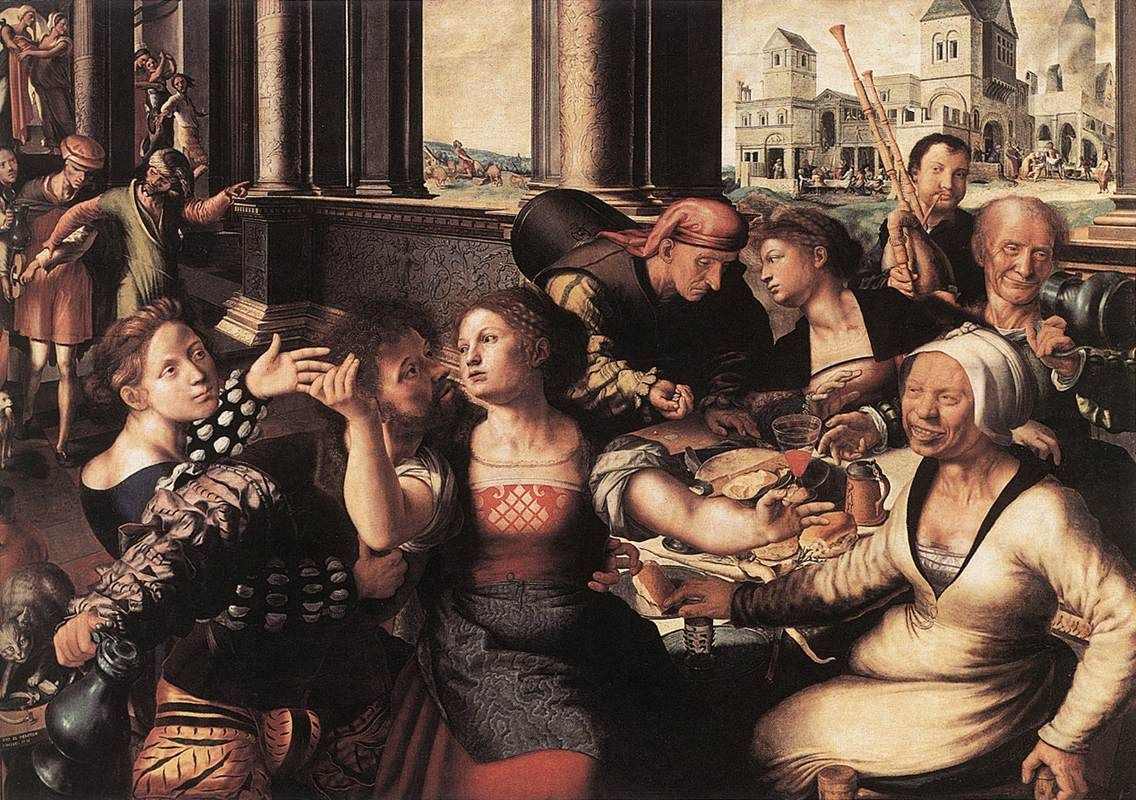
Jan van Hemessen, The Prodigal Son, 1536

Courtly party scenes, typically of couples of young lovers in a "garden of love", were popular in the late Middle Ages, mostly in illuminated manuscripts and prints rather than panel paintings, and often as part of calendar series showing the months, or book illustrations. In the Renaissance such scenes tended to be given specific settings from religion or classical mythology, such as the Feast of the Gods which, unlike merry company scenes, was an excuse for copious amounts of nudity. In 16th century Dutch and Flemish Renaissance painting traditions of genre painting of festivities or parties began to develop, most famously in the peasant scenes of Pieter Bruegel the Elder, which were the first large paintings to have peasant life as their sole subject.

There was also a tradition of moralizing urban scenes, including subjects such as the "Ill-matched Couple" and "Prodigal Son", and a court tradition of recording actual or typical entertainments at a particular court, with portraits of the leading personages. The Feast of Herod with the Beheading of St John the Baptist by the German-Silesian artist Bartholomeus Strobel (c. 1630–43, Prado) is an exceptionally large treatment of a subject often used since the 15th century to depict a courtly banquet. The Feast in the House of Levi by Paolo Veronese (1573, Gallerie dell'Accademia, Venice) is another famous and huge treatment of a grand feast.

The "courtly company scene" with anonymous genre figures developed in the first years of the 17th century in both the Northern and Southern Netherlands, now separated by the Eighty Years War. As the subject type developed, so did differences between the two regions: Flemish painting covered a wider range of settings in terms of class, with peasant scenes remaining strongly represented, and many scenes showing court milieus. Dutch painting concentrated on a class spectrum that might all be called middle-class, though ranging from elegant patrician companies to scruffy and rowdy groups. Flemish scenes tend to have far more characters, and the tranquil middle class group of four or five people sitting round a table at home is not seen. Whereas most Dutch paintings, except for those by the Utrecht Caravaggisti, had small figures, the "monumental company scene" remained part of Flemish painting, with Jacob Jordaens producing several examples, especially of Twelfth Night festivities. By the 1630s artists in both regions, but especially the north, tended to specialize in particular genres, and the merry company was no exception.

== Painters ==
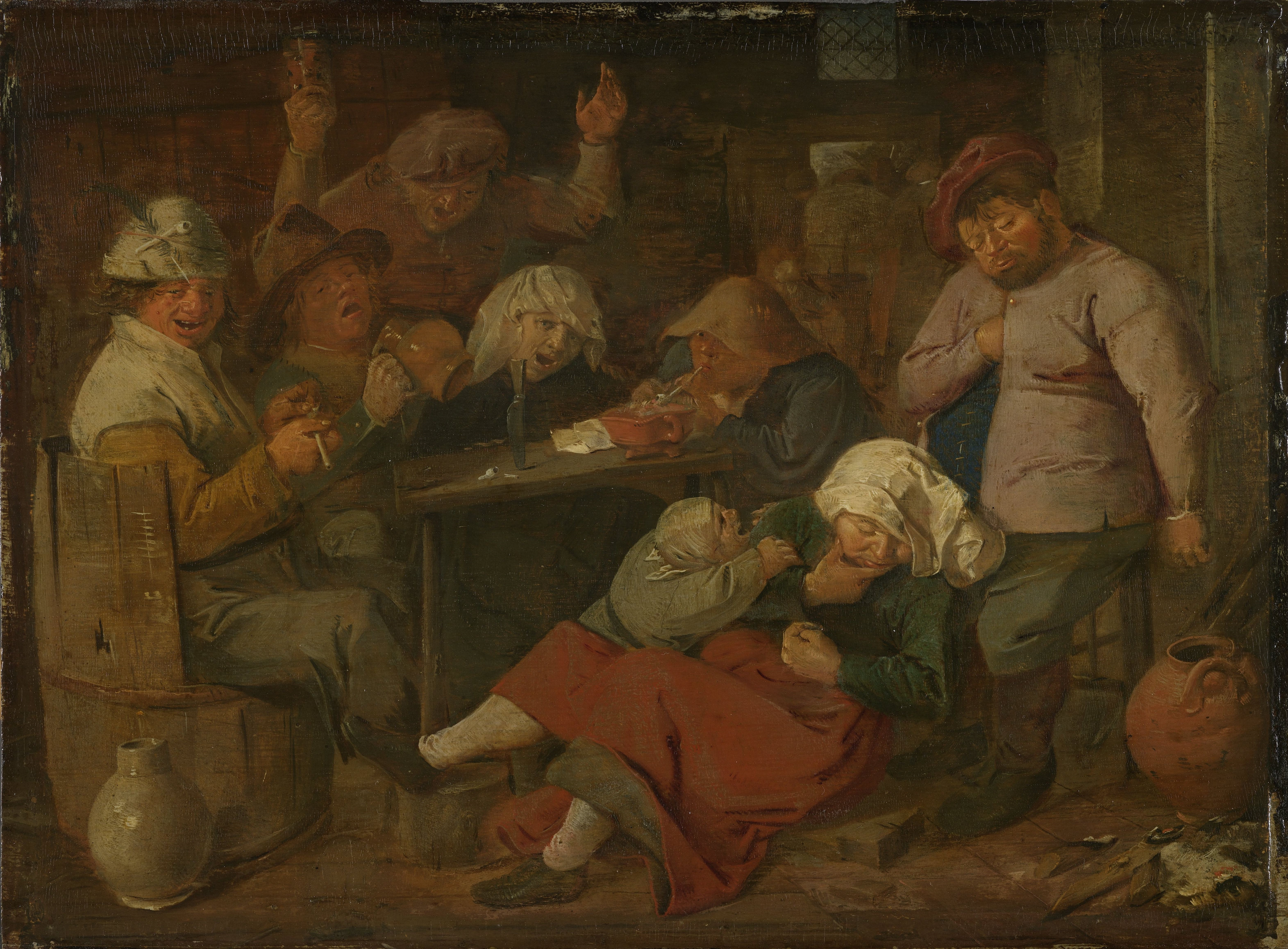
Adriaen Brouwer, Inn with Drunken Peasants, 1620s

The first generation of Dutch painters included Willem Pieterszoon Buytewech (1591/1592–1624), who can claim to have invented the small interior merry company, Other early artists were David Vinckboons (1576–1629), and Esaias van de Velde (1587–1630), who was an even more significant pioneer of realistic landscape painting, in a completely different style to his elegant garden parties. The famous portraitist Frans Hals was attributed with a single very early merry company, a gallant picnic of about 1610, which was destroyed in Berlin in World War II; he also painted a "close-up" genre depiction of three revellers. His younger brother Dirck Hals (1591–1656) was a prolific specialist in small merry company groups.

By about 1630 active painters included Hendrik Gerritsz. Pot (1587–1657), also a portraitist, Anthonie Palamedesz. (1601–1673), Pieter Codde (1599–1678), and Jacob Duck (1600–1667). Codde and Duck, with Willem Duyster, were also painters of "guardroom scenes", which showed soldiers specifically, and became popular in the 1630s; as Lucy van de Pol notes, the sailors who made up a great part of the clientele of taverns and brothels, at least in Amsterdam, are very rarely represented.

After about the mid-century many "company paintings" showed smaller and more quiet groups more firmly located in homes, often with more narrative elements and a greater concentration on effects of lighting and texture. Pictures showing many of the same interests as "company" works, but just using couples or individuals become very common. The paintings of Vermeer, none of which quite fall into the category of "merry company" works, exemplify this trend, which is also seen in those of Gerard ter Borch, Gabriel Metsu, Gerrit Dou, and Pieter de Hooch. The works of Jan Steen (c. 1626–1679) maintained the tradition of rowdy drinking groups, but usually with a setting showing a specific occasion, or illustrating a proverb. Many show family groups, and often a self-portrait is included.

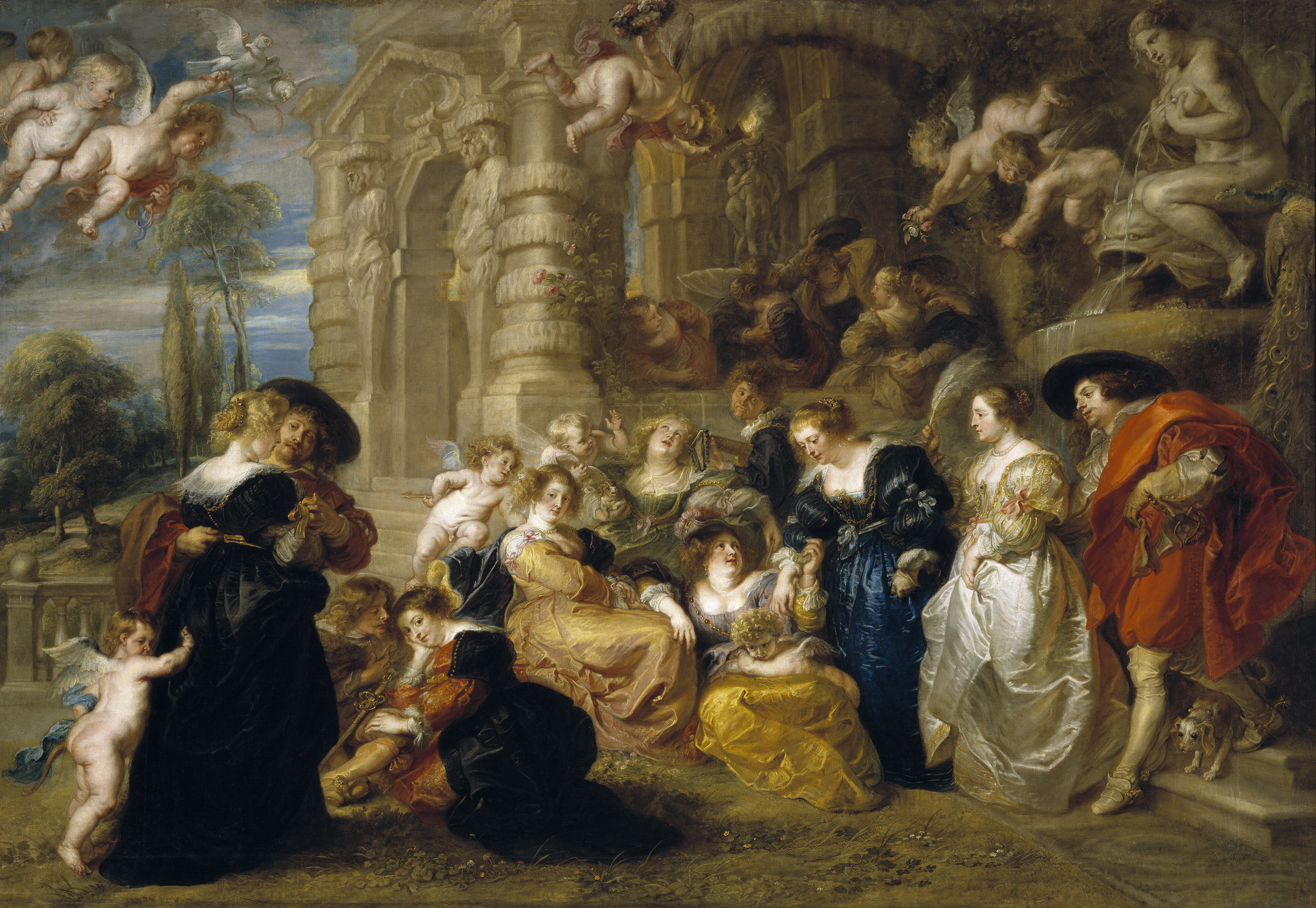
Peter Paul Rubens, Garden of Love, 1630–35, the apotheosis of the outdoor courtly company

Flemish artists include David Vinckboons, who moved to the north as a young adult, Frans Francken II with his uncle Hieronymus I and brother Hieronymus II, Sebastian Vrancx, Louis de Caullery, all painting courtly scenes, often with small figures and much attention given to the architectural settings in or outside sumptuous palaces. Simon de Vos (1603–1676), painted smaller scenes closer to the Dutch style.

The Bruegel tradition of peasant scenes was continued by his sons Jan Brueghel I and Peter Brueghel the Younger, mostly painting kermesse-type festivities with large numbers of figures, most often outdoors. Smaller groups in interiors were pioneered by the intensely naturalistic Adriaen Brouwer, who was Flemish but also worked and sold in Haarlem in the north, where he greatly influenced Adriaen van Ostade, the leading Dutch painter of peasants. Brouwer's sordid scenes are short on merriment, but van Ostade softened and sentimentalized his style.

David Teniers the Elder, his son David Teniers the Younger as well as other members of the family included many peasant scenes in their large and varied output. Most of the works of all these painters lie outside the typical boundaries of the "merry company", in terms of the number of figures or their class, but many fall within; there was also a later generation of Flemish painters of peasant scenes. Rubens, who owned 17 paintings by Adriaen Brouwer, painted a few kermesse and other peasant scenes that are highly successful, despite their very heroic style. He also painted a few large courtly company scenes, including his Garden of Love, (Prado, 1634–5), looking forward to the French Fête galante type of the next century.

Apart from Jordaens and Rubens, Flemish painters of monumental company scenes included Theodoor Rombouts (1597–1637), who made several large paintings of card-players, Cornelis de Vos, and Jan Cossiers.
