= Waalse Kerk, Haarlem =

15th century Walloon church in Haarlem, Netherlands

Coordinates: 52°22′56″N 4°38′21″E

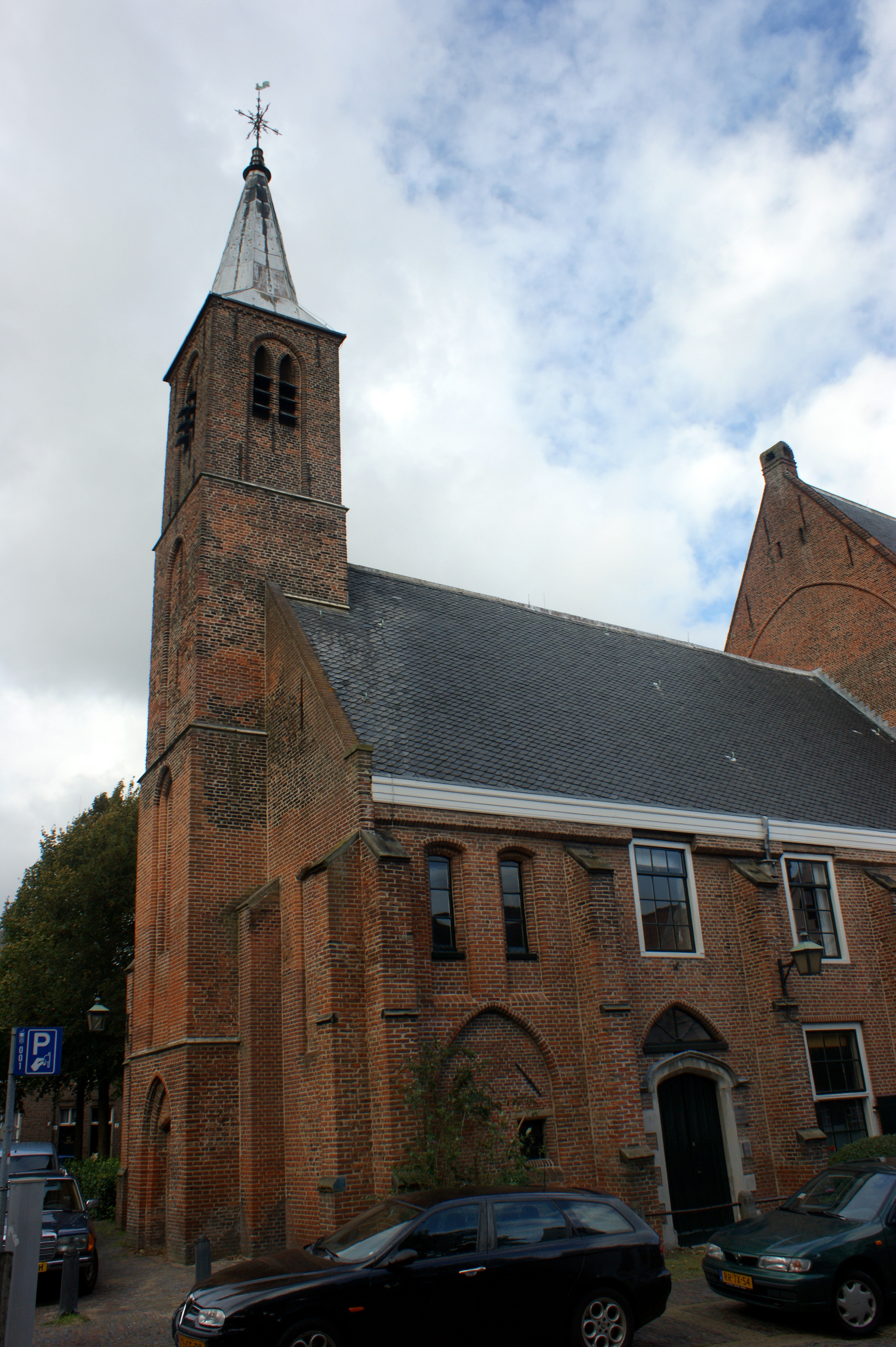
The Waalse kerk in Haarlem.

The Waalse kerk is a historical church dating from the 14th century on the Begijnhof in Haarlem, Netherlands.

== History ==
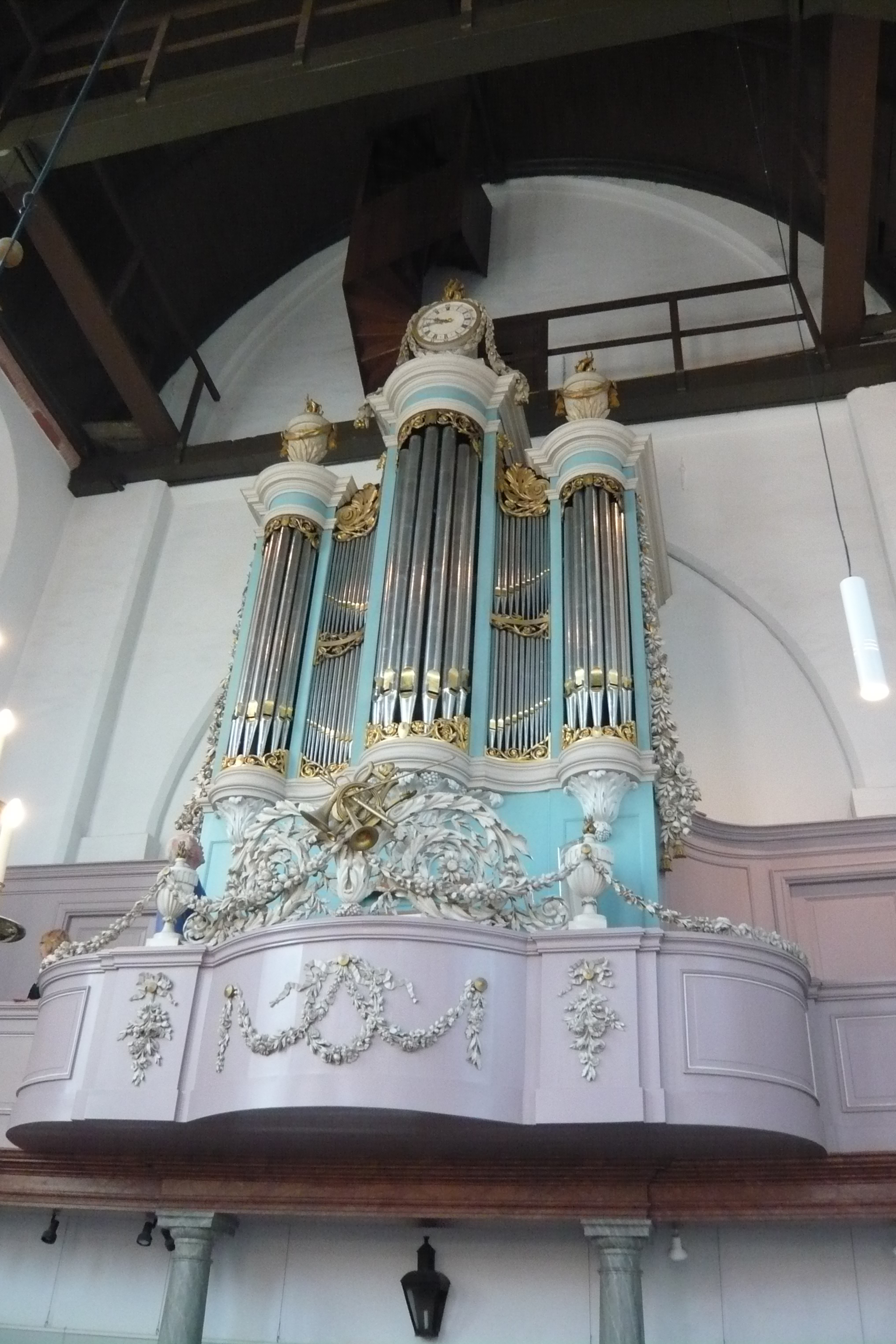
The organ was built in 1808 by Friederichs.

The Waalse kerk is a Walloon church that was built in the middle of the 14th century and has an upper gallery built for the Beguines who lived there on the courtyard that still bears their name. The sacristy dates from the 16th century, with wooden arches and a mantel from the 17th century. The organ was built in 1808 by Friederichs, and in the attic, there is a mechanical clock that drives the hands on the clock of the organ. In the church tower there is a bell from 1512 with a diameter of 56.5 centimeters.
