= Ludolf de Jongh =

Dutch painter

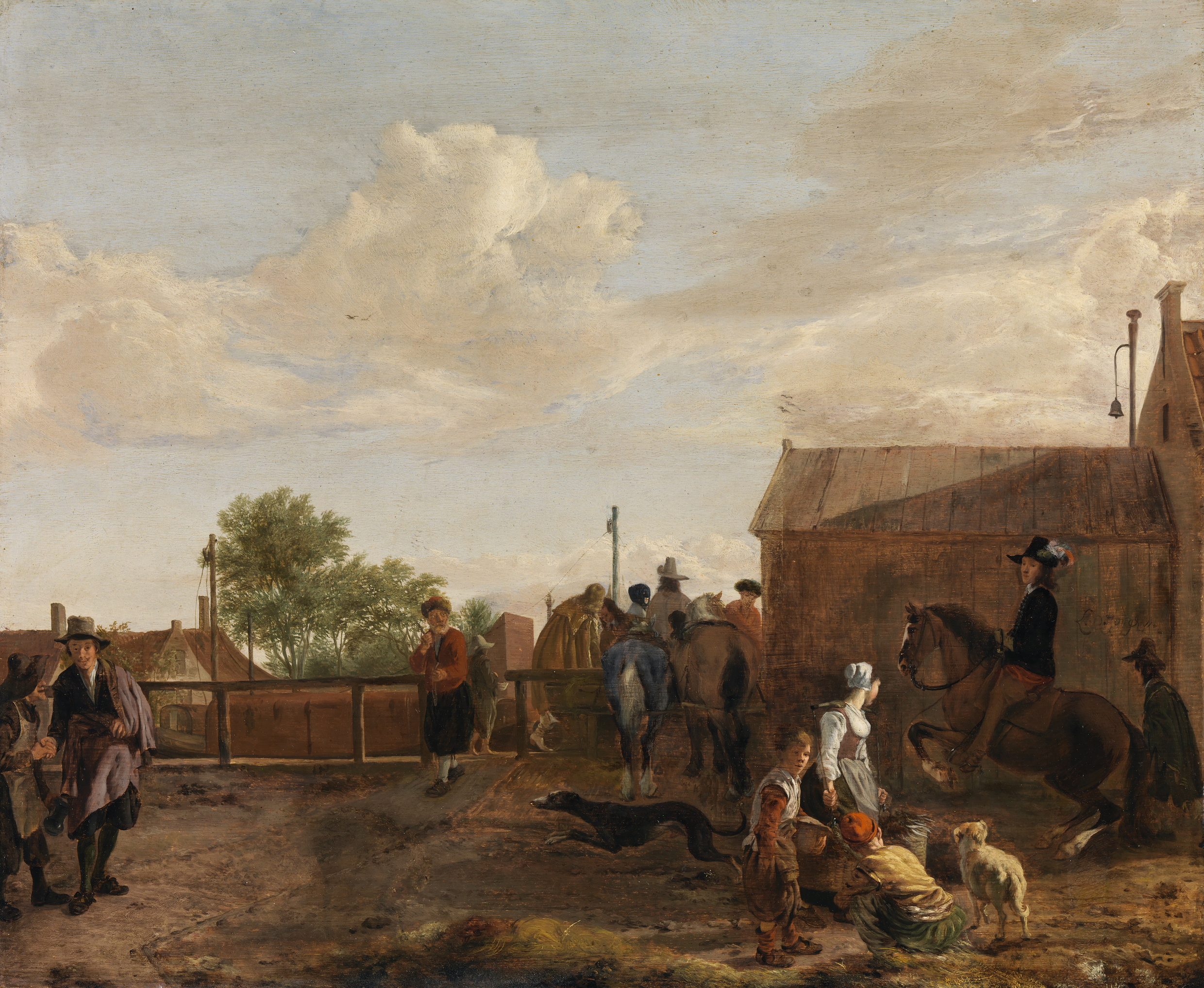
Canal Boat Station, c. 1649

Ludolf de Jongh or Ludolf Leendertsz. de Jongh (Overschie, 1616 – Hillegersberg, 1679) was a Dutch painter, known for his genre scenes, hunting scenes, history paintings, landscapes, cityscapes, and portraits. He was further a merchant, an officer in the civil guard of Rotterdam and a schout (sheriff) of Hillegersberg. He was in the 1650s the leading genre painter in Rotterdam whose work influenced artists such as Pieter de Hooch. He was active as a staffage painter and added the figures in the works of artists such as the church interior painter Anthonie de Lorme and the landscape painter Joris van der Haagen.

== Life ==
De Jongh was born in Overschie (then a village near Rotterdam, which has now become part of Rotterdam) as the son of Leendert Leendertsz de Jongh and Annetje Leuvens. The family later moved to Rotterdam where the father was mentioned in 1647 as an inn-keeper. The De Jongh family was rather well-off as at the death of the father in 1670 he owned several houses.

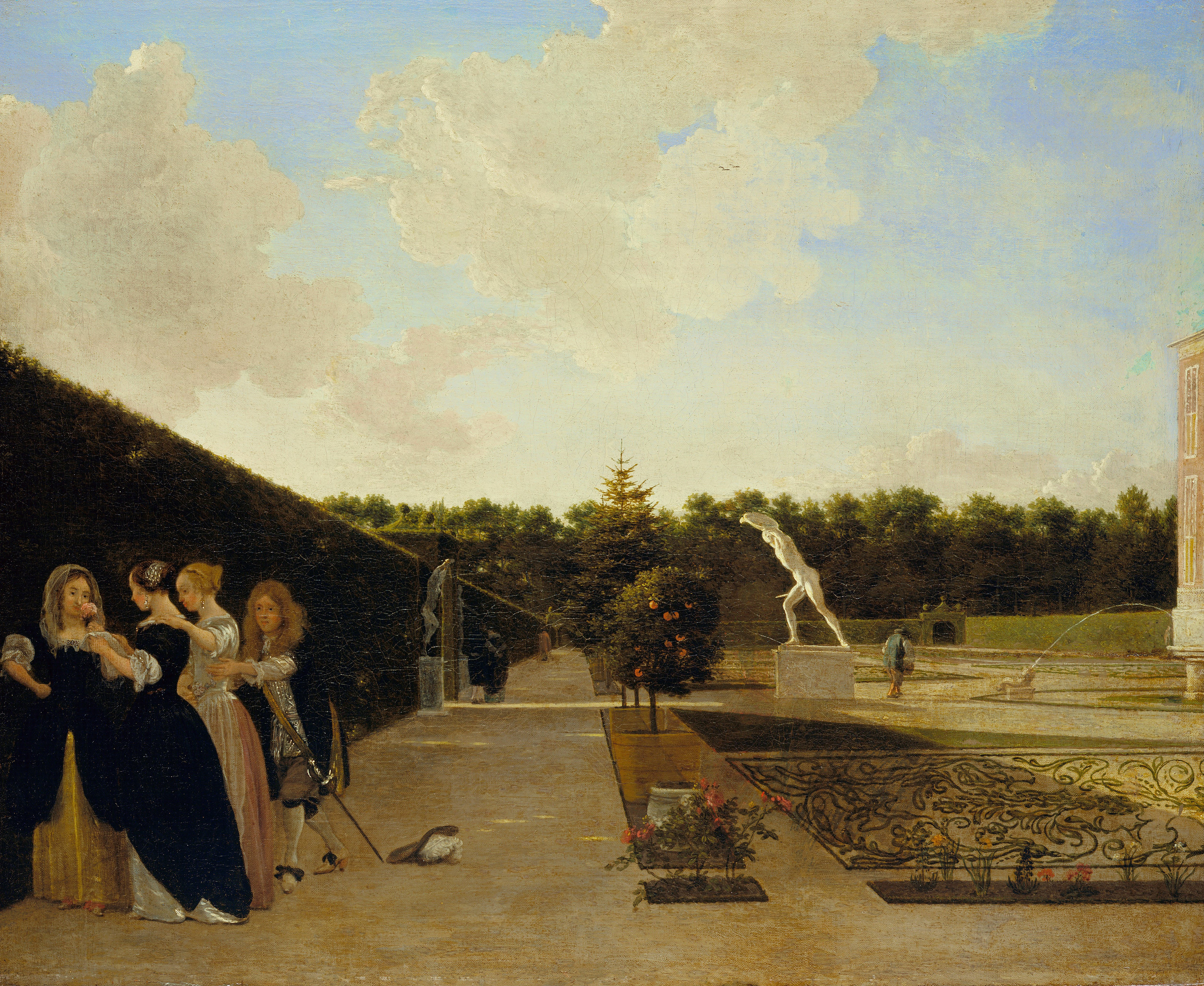
A Formal Garden, Three Ladies Surprised by a Gentleman

The early Dutch biographer Arnold Houbraken who is the main source on De Jongh's life claims that the young artist was a pupil of the versatile genre and landscape painter Cornelis Saftleven. Houbraken also states that he studied under the genre and portrait painter Anthonie Palamedesz. in Delft and subsequently with the Caravaggist painter Jan van Bijlert in Utrecht. Some doubts have been raised about his study with Jan van Bijlert as in his early works the influence of the Utrecht Caravaggisti is not discernible and only appears in his works from the late 1640s onwards.

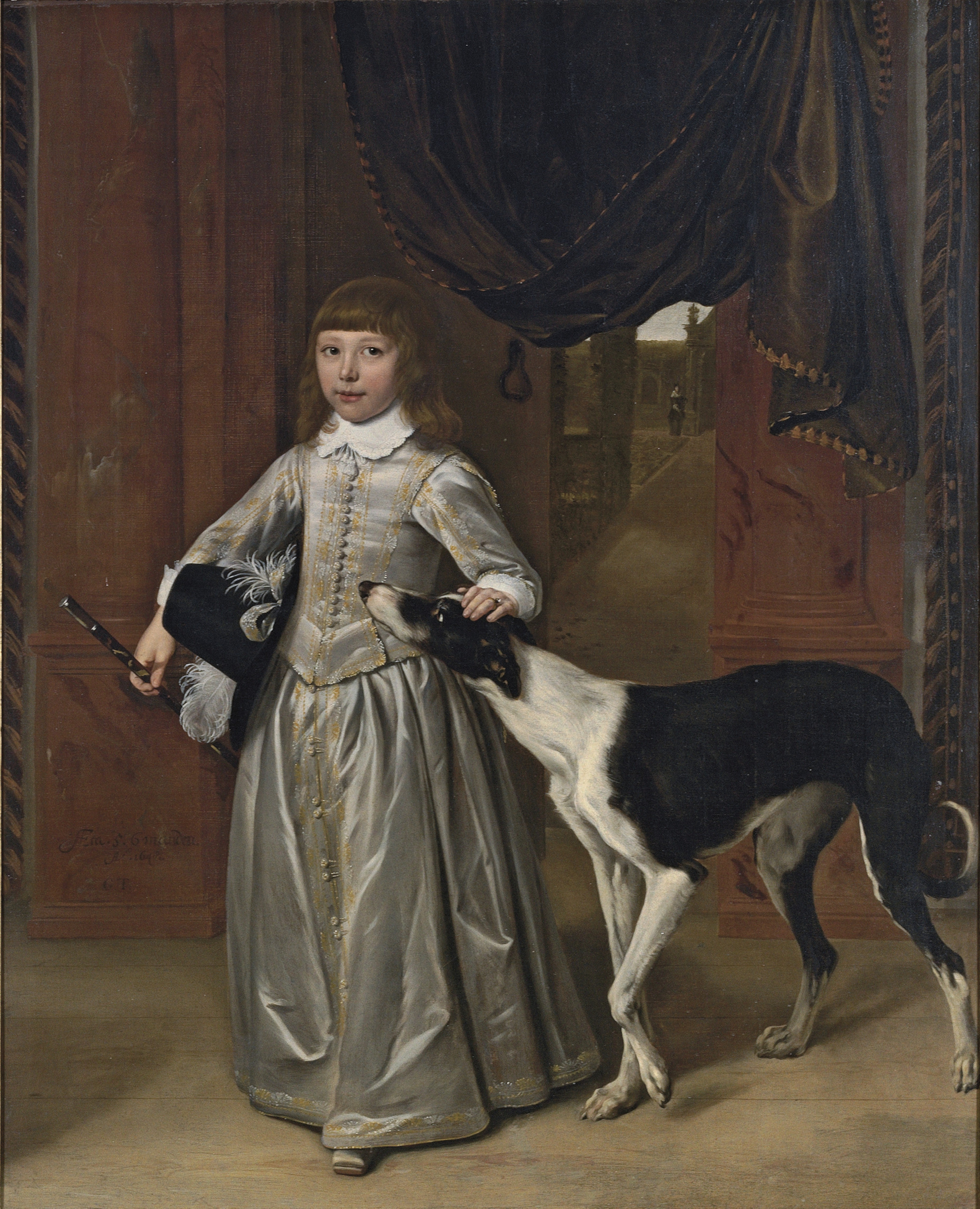
Portrait of a boy, full-length, with a dog

Houbraken claims that De Jongh travelled in 1635 at the age of 19 to France in the company of a certain Frans Bacon. He stayed in France for seven years and only returned to the Dutch Republic in 1642 upon learning that his mother had fallen ill. He took up residence in Rotterdam the same year and his earliest signed paintings date from that year. He married on 6 February 1646 in Rotterdam Adriana Pietersdr. Montagne, the daughter of Pieter Montagne who was reportedly a member of the highest circles of Rotterdam. In the 1650s he became one of the most fashionable painters of Rotterdam achieving success with innovations in portraiture.

He was awarded the rank of major in the schutterij (civil guard) of Rotterdam in 1652. In 1659 he was appointed to the College of the Oude-mannenhuismeesters (Board of the Masters of the Old Men's Home) on which he served for two years. In 1665 he was appointed the schout of Hillegersberg ( a village near Rotterdam), a position he fulfilled until his death. He sold his house in Rotterdam and moved to Hillegersberg to exercise his duties as a schout. From 1660 onwards he painted less, possibly because of his various responsibilities as a major, a merchant, and later, a schout in Hillegersberg.

He was the master of Johannes van der Meer and the more famous genre and portrait painter Jacob Ochtervelt. He died in Hillegersberg between 27 May 1679 and 8 September 1679.

== Work ==
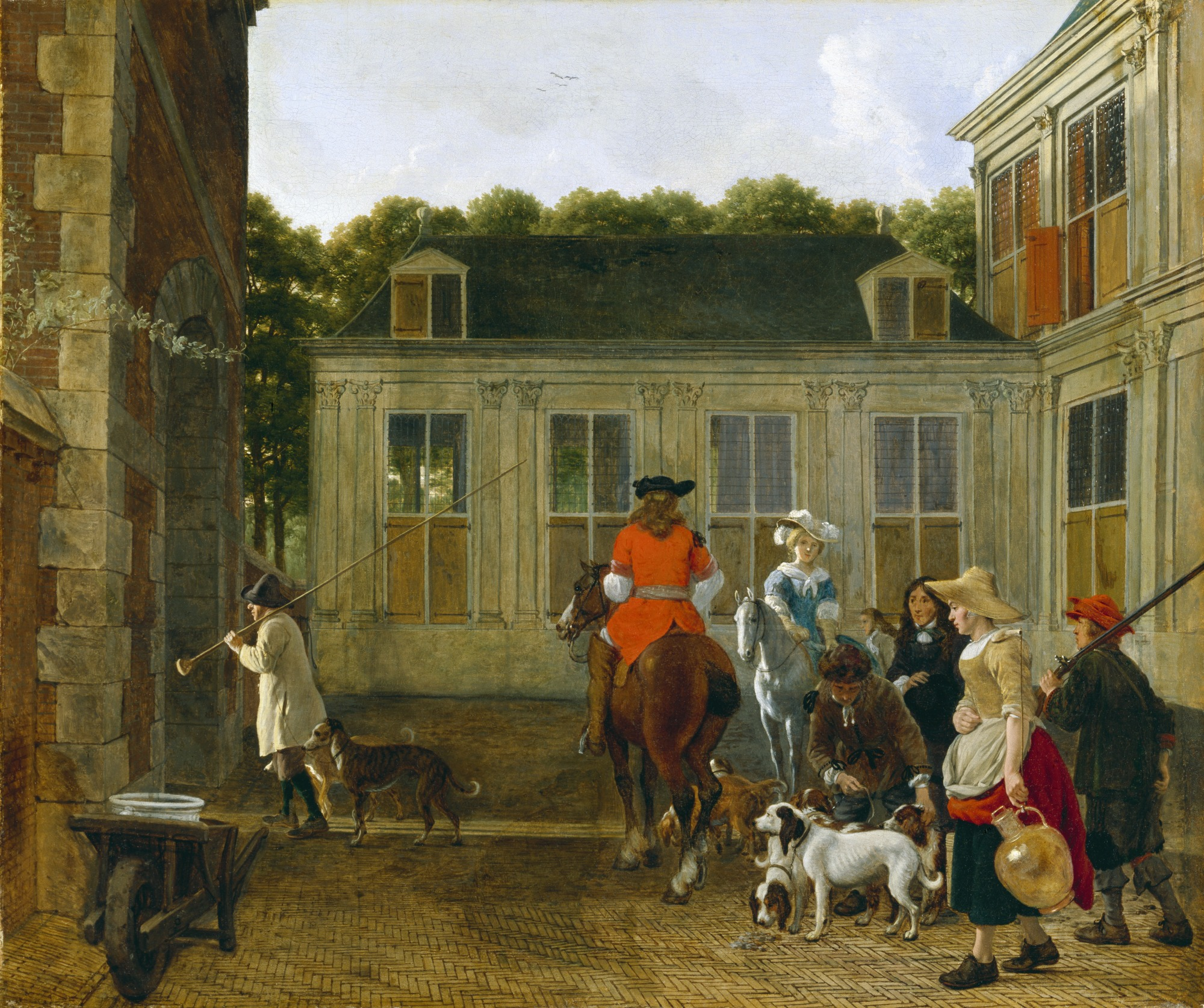
Hunting Party in the Courtyard of a Country House

=== General ===
De Jongh was a very versatile painter who practised most genres popular in the Dutch Republic except still life painting. This versatility is possibly explained by the fact that he was of independent means due to his inheritance and did not need to cater to the varying tastes of his patrons or specialise in a specific genre such as landscapes in order to ensure a steady income. Due to the broad scope of genres in which he painted, his frequent changes of style and his habit not to sign his works often, attributions of work to the artist have been difficult. None of his works from his French period are known. He probably created portraits during that period. His earliest known paintings are genre scenes and portraits dating from his return to Rotterdam around 1642. By the 1660s he had moved away from genre scenes of peasants, taverns and guardrooms towards elegant, even aristocratic subjects such as hunts. In the 1650s he was one of the most fashionable painters of Rotterdam.

=== Genre scenes ===
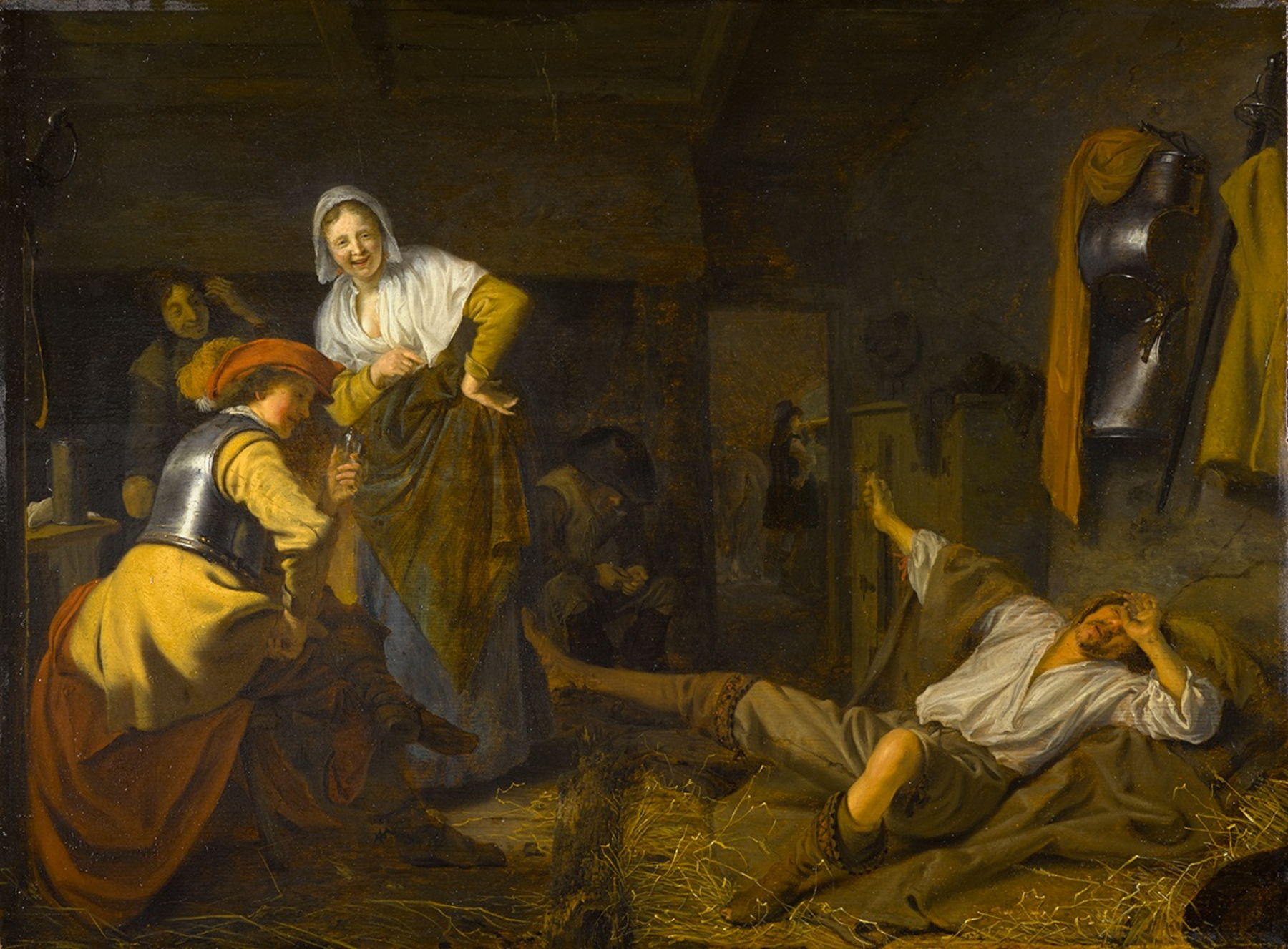
Soldiers at reveille

His genre scenes from the early 1640 typically depict peasants or soldiers in dark and monochromatic interiors with some bright color accents. This shows a similarity with the genre paintings of his presumed master Cornelis Saftleven and the Delft painter Anthonie Palamedesz. His genre subjects and hunting scenes of the late 1640s show an indebtedness to the Dutch followers of Caravaggio, the so-called Utrecht Caravaggisti, especially Jacob Duck.

Like his master Palamedesz. he painted guardroom scenes, which show soldiers in guardrooms who are engaged in recreational activities. This genre was particularly popular in the Dutch Republic although it was also practised in Flanders by artists such as David Teniers the Younger. The principal exponents in this genre were Pieter Codde, Willem Duyster and Simon Kick in Amsterdam, Jacob Duck in Utrecht and Anthonie Palamedesz. and Jacob van Velsen in Delft. Often referred to in the Dutch language as 'cortegaerdje', guardroom scenes showed interiors with soldiers at rest. The genre became popular after 1621 when the Twelve Years' Truce with Spain ended. Stationed throughout the Dutch Republic, soldiers would often have long periods during which there was no military action. They used this leisure time to interact with the local population or entertain themselves. Examples of paintings of De Jongh broadly falling into this genre are the Tavern scene (1650, National Gallery Prague) and the Soldiers at reveille (1653, North Carolina Museum of Art).

=== Portraits ===
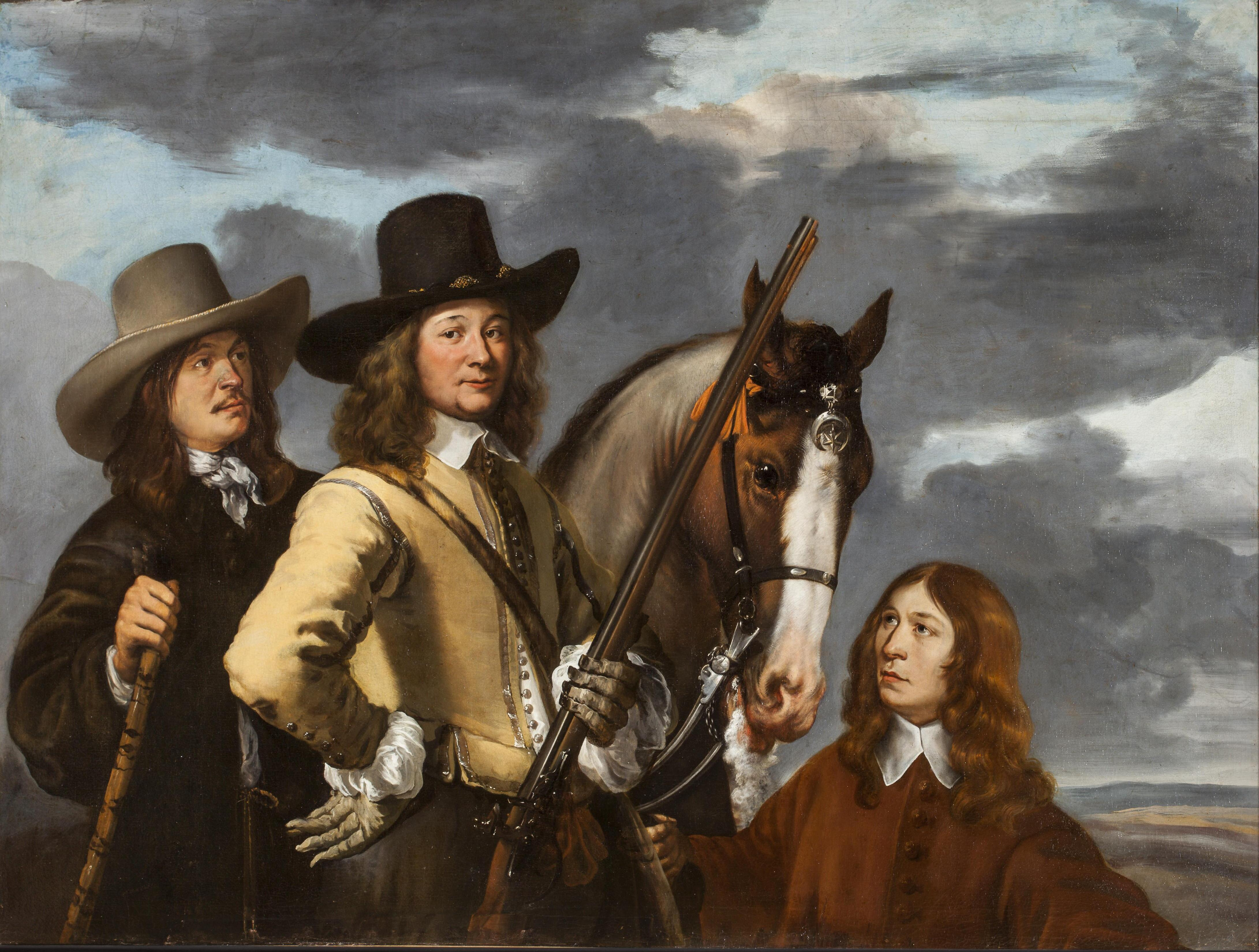
Portrait of Willem Everwijn with his Horse and Two Huntsmen

While now known mainly for his genre work, De Jongh's principal area of activity was portraiture. He started out painting portraits in the more traditional Dutch style characterised by its formal depiction of the sitters. He likely trained in this style with his teacher Anthonie Palamedesz. who had studied it himself under his presumed master Michiel Jansz. van Mierevelt.

De Jongh's later works reflect a development in the mid-17th-century Dutch Republic towards a more opulent style and a greater plasticity of handling of which the Amsterdam painter Bartholomeus van der Helst was the principal proponent. He experimented with various innovations in portraiture in this period, both in his use of space and light effects as well as by paying more attention to the psychological expression of his sitters. This approach in his works had a significant influence on the young Pieter de Hooch. An example of a portrait from his later period is the Portrait of a boy, full-length, with a dog of 1648 (At Christie's (London) on 2 December 2008, lot 3) depicting a boy wearing a rich silken doublet and skirt. The modelling of the brushwork in this work is fluid and confident. The portrait shows three typical elements of his portraiture: the restricted palette used for the sitter, the careful delineation and representation of the features and the inclusion of a dog. In the latter he shows a knowledge of van Dyck’s portraits.

He painted a schuttersstuk (a group portrait of officers of the civil guard) of Rotterdam. Houbraken saw the work in the target practice hall of the schutterij in the 18th century. The current location of the work is unknown.
