= Anthonie Palamedesz. =

Dutch Golden Age portrait painter (1602–1673)

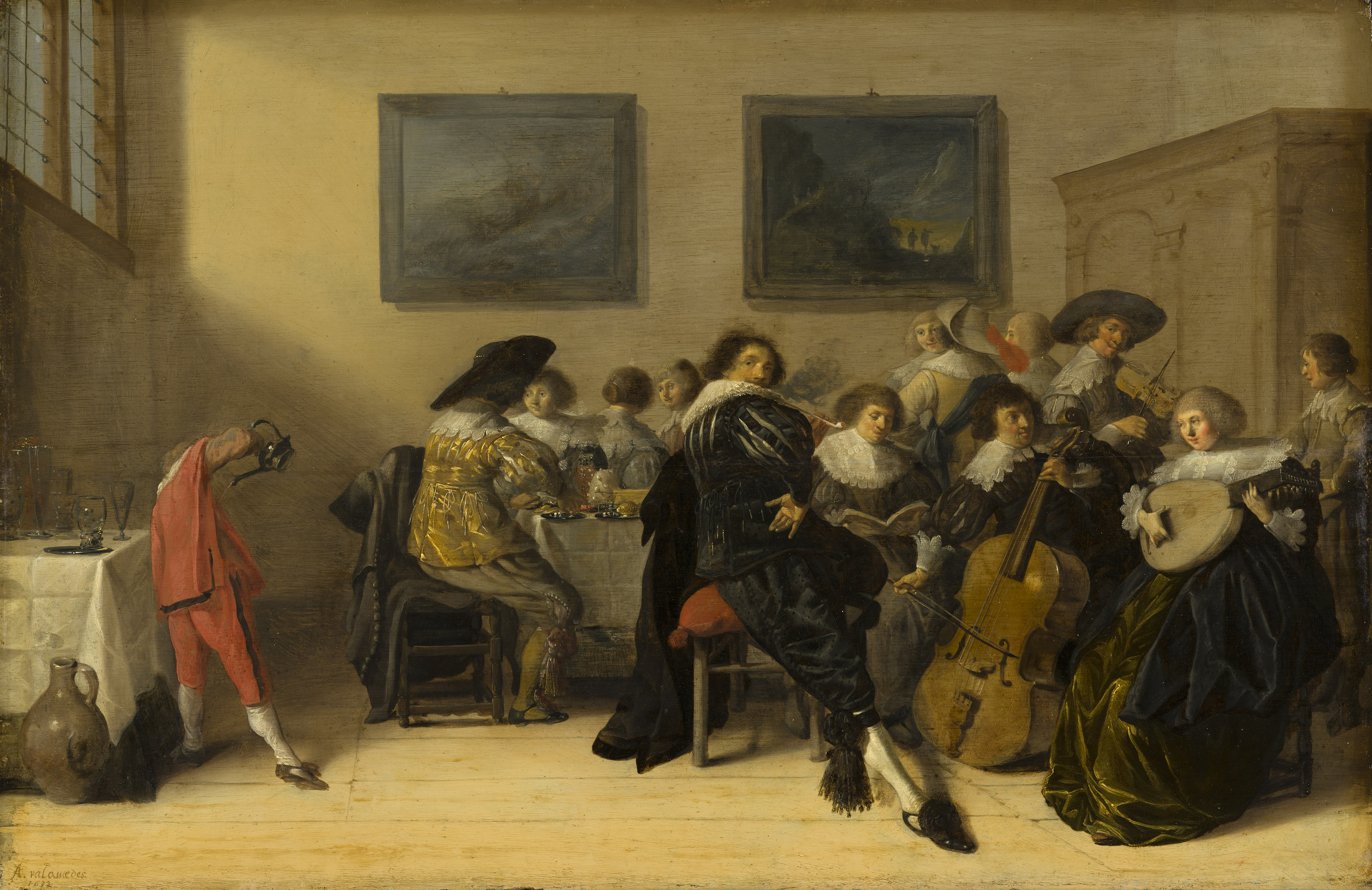
Merry Company

Anthonie Palamedesz., also Antonie Palamedesz, birth name Antonius Stevens (1602 in Leith, Scotland – 27 November 1673 in Amsterdam), was a Dutch portrait and genre painter. He is in particular known for his merry company paintings depicting elegant figures engaged in play, music and conversation as well as guardroom scenes showing soldiers in guardrooms. Like many Dutch painters of his time, he painted portraits and still lifes, including vanitas still lifes. He further painted the staffage in a few views of the interior of churches. He played a major role in the development of genre painting in Delft in the mid 17th century.

== Life ==
He was born in Leith, Scotland as the son of Palamedes Willemsz. Stevens and Marie Arsene (in Dutch, called Maeijken van Naerssen) and was baptized on 9 November 1602 in South Leith. His father was a sculptor, stone cutter and court artist who was likely Flemish. His father carved semi-precious stones such as jasper, porphyry, and agate into vases and practised other decorative arts. His father was in the service of the Scottish King James VI and possibly traveled with the King to London when he was crowned King of England as James I of England.

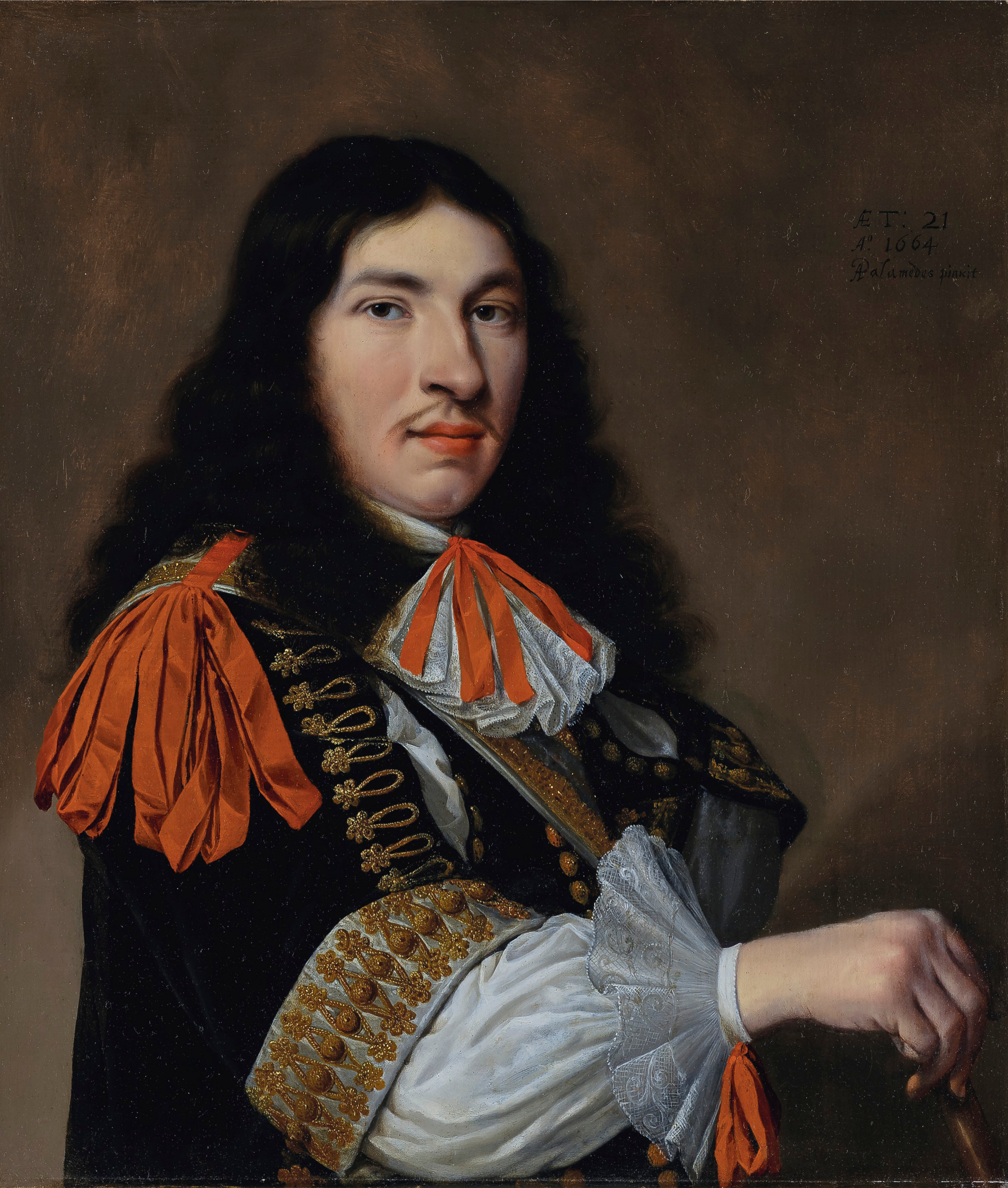
Portrait of a richly dressed young man, half-length

His father had married Maeijken van Naerssen in Leith on 6 June 1601. The couple had three children: Guilliaem (1601-1688), who became a tailor, Anthonie and Palamedes I (1605-1638) who also became a painter. After Anthonie's youngest brother Palamedes was born, the family left Scotland and established themselves in Delft in the Dutch Republic where the boys grew up. Anthonie was taught by the leading portrait painter Michiel Jansz. van Mierevelt and the history and genre painter Hans Jordaens. He entered the Delft Guild of St. Luke in 1621 or 1636 and was hoofdman (deacon) of the Guild in 1635, 1658, 1663 and 1672. When Anthonie and his brother Palamedes were registered with the Guild, they received the discounted entry fee reserved for residents of the city, which suggests that their father had lived in Delft before leaving for Scotland, possibly as a Protestant fugitive from the Spanish Inquisition in his native Flanders.

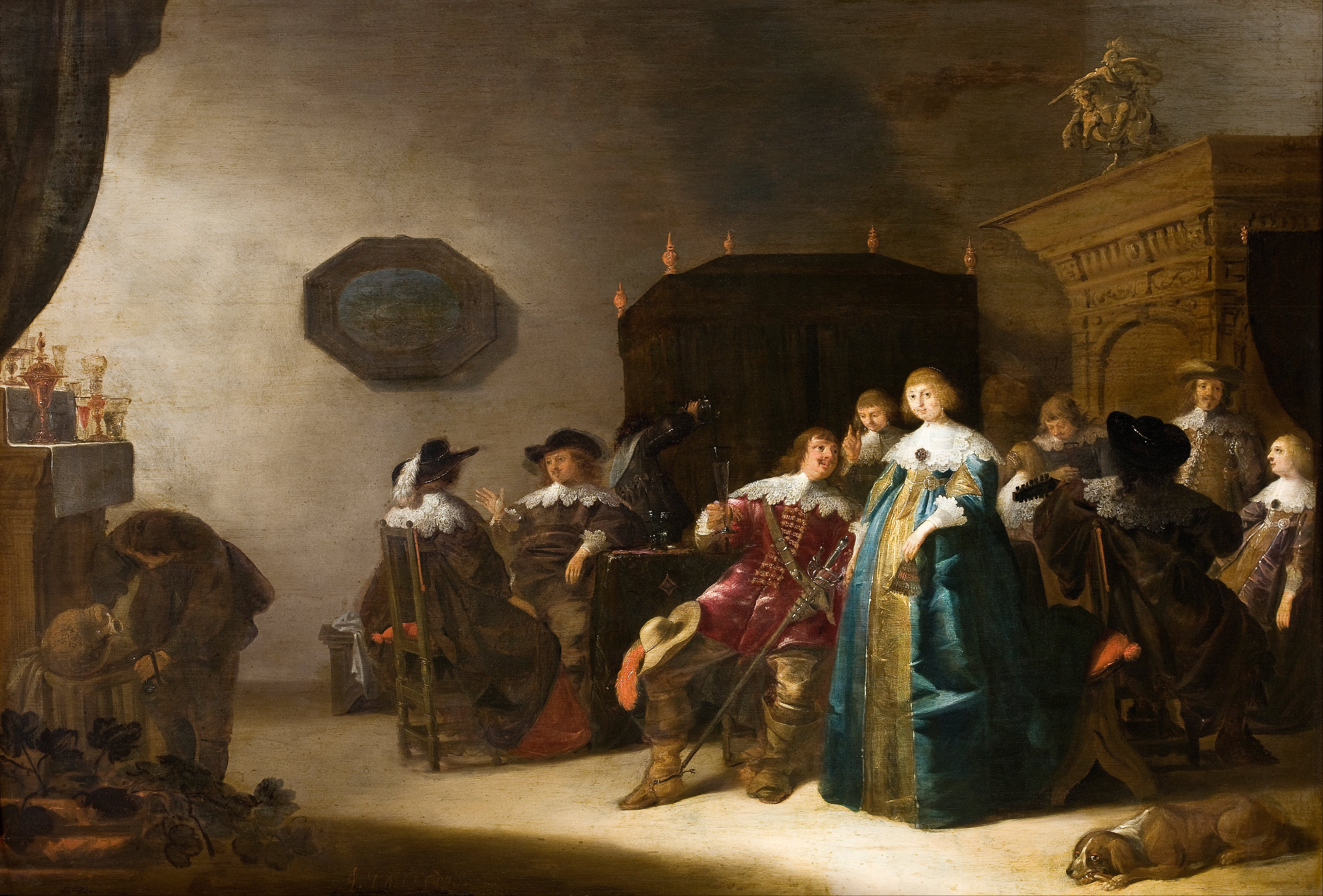
Merry Company

Anthonie married Anna Joosten van Hoorndijck (died 1651) on 16 March 1630 in Delft. The couple had six children of whom a son called Palamedes Palamedesz. II. The son was traditionally believed to have been a painter, but the current view is that this was likely not the case. After the death of his first wife, he married again on 29 December 1658 to Agata Woodward (in Dutch called Aechgen Woedewart), born in Delft as the daughter of an Englishman who did business with Dutch printers.

His pupils included his younger brother Palamedes, who died young in 1638 and was mainly a battle painter, and the painter Ludolf de Jongh.

While Anthonie enjoyed considerable financial success in his early years and was able to purchase an expensive house in Delft, his financial situation had declined considerably by 1668 when he received an exceptional subsidy from the Delft city counsel. He moved to Amsterdam to live with his eldest son at Oudeschans. There he died on 27 November 1673 and was buried on 1 December 1673 in the Oude Kerk

== Work ==
=== General ===
Palamedesz. primarily painted genre works and portraits including individual and group portraits. He was known for his merry company paintings showing elegant figures engaging in play, music and conversation and his guardroom scenes of military life, which were highly appreciated by his upper middle class patrons.

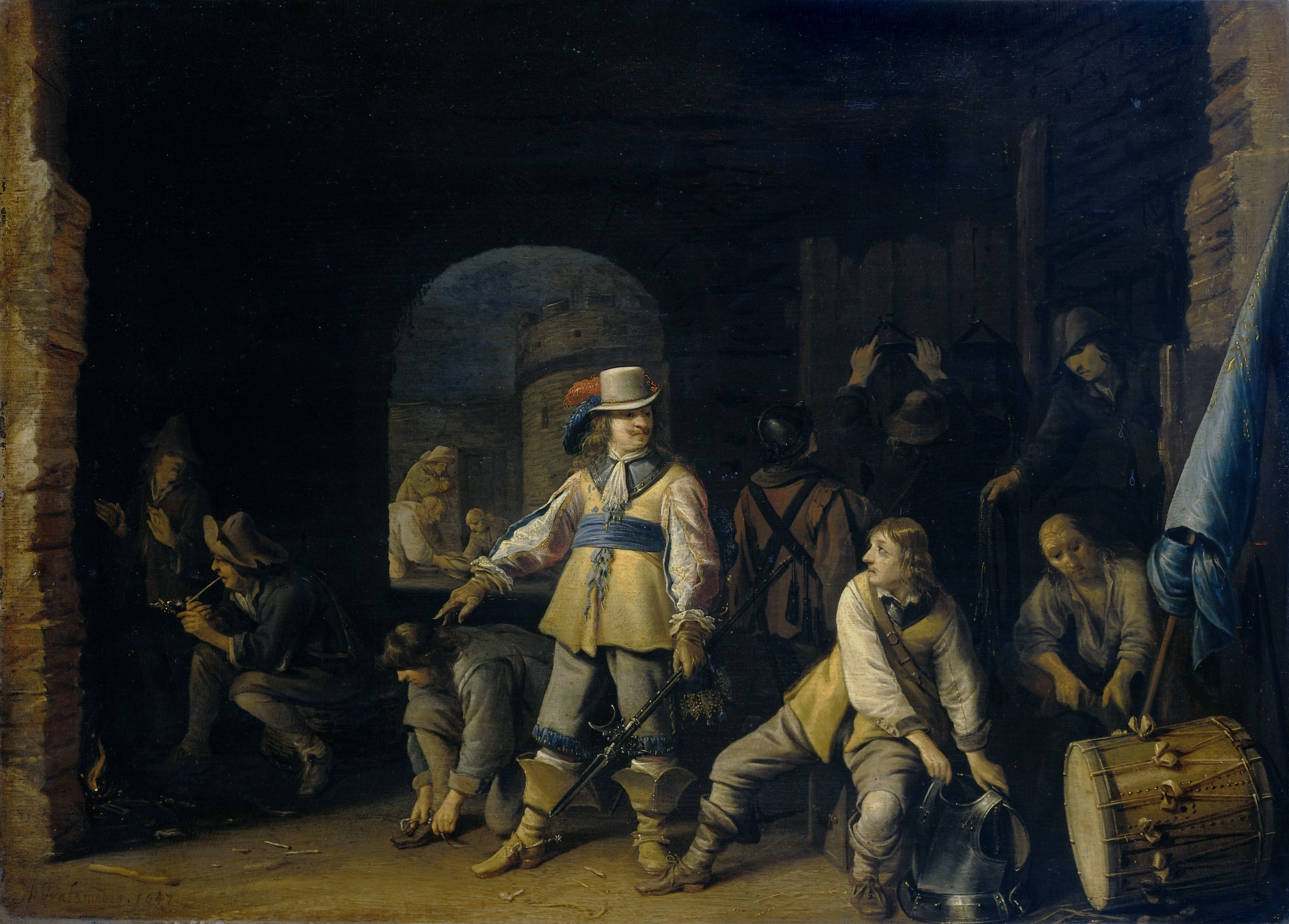
Guard room scene

=== Guard room scenes ===
He was one of the primary practitioners of the genre of the guardroom scene, which shows soldiers in guardrooms who are engaged in recreational activities. This genre was particularly popular in the Dutch Republic although it was also practised in Flanders by artists such as David Teniers the Younger. The principal exponents in this genre were Pieter Codde, Willem Duyster and Simon Kick in Amsterdam, Jacob Duck in Utrecht and Anthonie Palamedesz. and Jacob van Velsen in Delft. Often referred to in the Dutch language as 'cortegaerdje', guardroom scenes showed interiors with soldiers at rest. The genre became popular after 1621 when the Twelve Years' Truce with Spain ended. Stationed throughout the Dutch Republic, soldiers would often have long periods during which there was no military action. They used this leisure time to interact with the local population or entertain themselves.

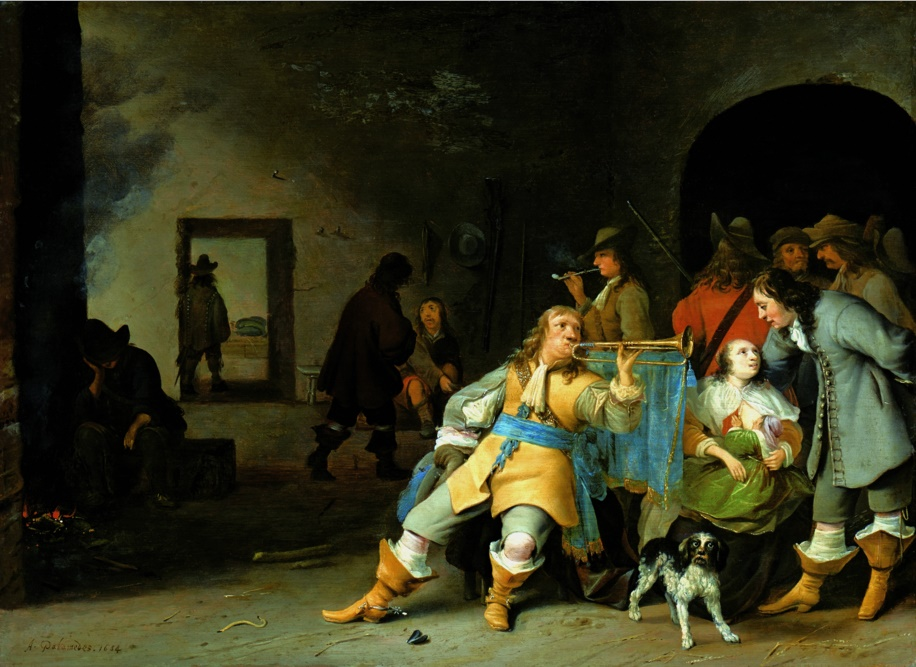
Guardroom scene with a trumpeter and woman breast feeding

In the early phase of the genre, guardroom scenes showed resting soldiers seated, in conversation while they relax and tend to their uniforms, arguing over loot, carousing with prostitutes, playing cards, smoking a pipe or engaging in other morally questionable behaviour. In a second phase, starting roughly around 1645, the behaviour of the soldiers became more refined, thus reflecting the growing civility in Dutch society. In this later phase guardroom scenes were devoid of booty and other signs of war and showed middle-class people interacting with the soldiers.

In his guardroom scenes which he painted well into the 1660s, Palamedes typically depicts a large hall of a ruin or a castle, which is open at the rear and usually has a large fireplace. The centre of the scene is almost always taken up by an officer, who is chubby and wearing a tall hat and a small moustache. In many of his guardroom scenes, Palamedesz. achieves the elegance and monumentality seen in the schutterij (civic guard) group portraits so popular in 17th-century Dutch painting. His guardroom scenes are unique, in that he includes women in their role as mothers and not their more conventional role of courtesans. Palamedesz.' guardroom scenes thus represent the masculine outdoors that has been pacified and tamed by feminine domestic motherhood. In other words, the apparently virile guard room scenes are in fact an embodiment of masculinity pacified, reflecting a broader process in 17th-century Dutch society of growing femininity and civility.

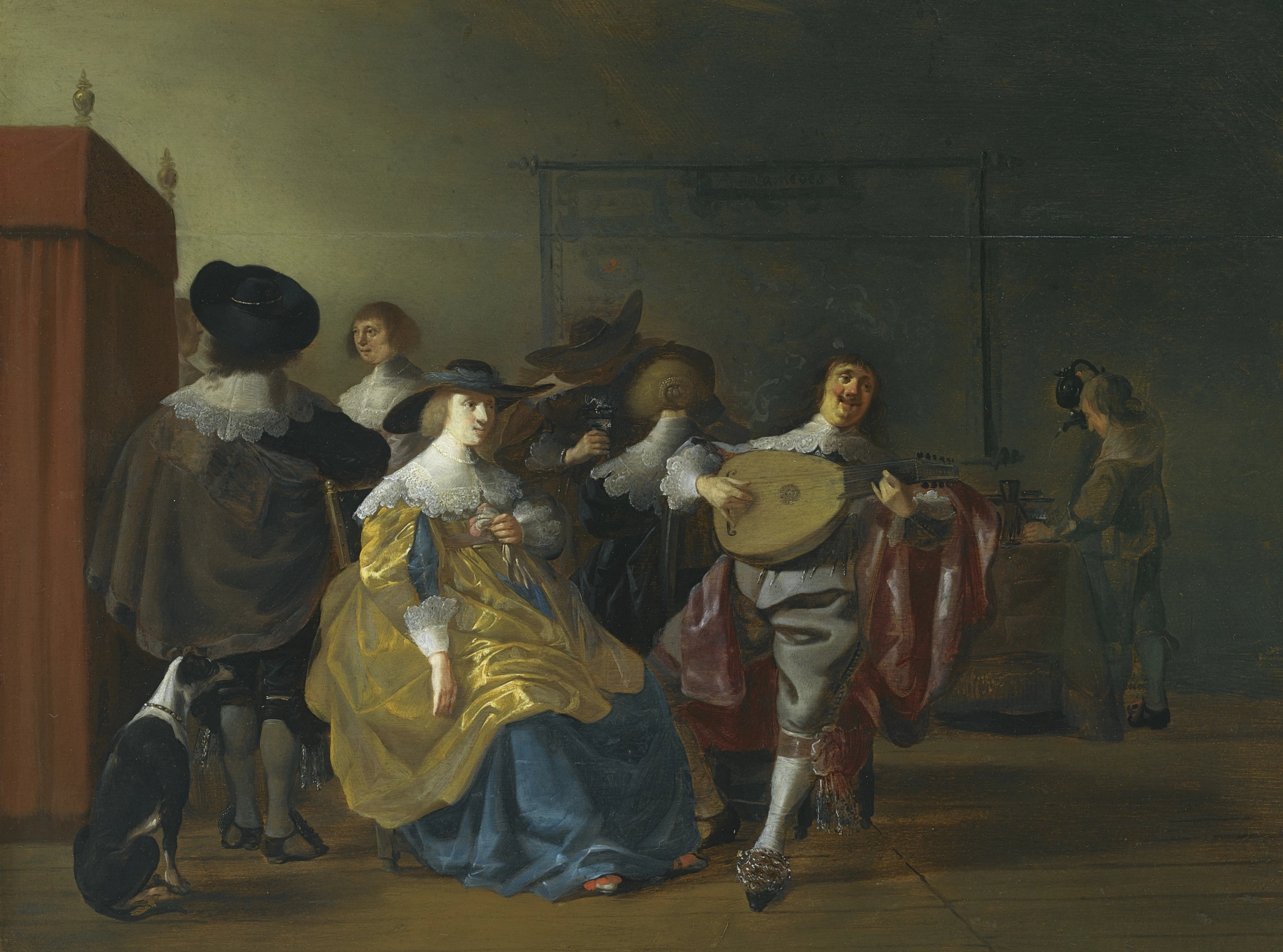
Elegant company in conversation playing games and drinking in an interior

=== Merry companies ===
Palamedesz. painted many merry company paintings, which show elegantly dressed merrymakers in fairly summarily painted interiors. Typically, the figures are partaking in the pleasures of alcohol, tobacco, games, courtship and music. He painted his most accomplished paintings in this genre early in his career. While some of his contemporaries included strong moral meanings in their merry companies, in particular by warning against the dangers of excess and erotic love, Palamedesz. does not appear to have been particularly interested in this motive. He more likely painted these scenes solely for the enjoyment of his patrons who would have engaged in similar behaviour in their spare time.

The interiors of these scenes are usually lit by a strong light entering from the left from two unknown sources. The figures are often typically crowded on one side of the picture. These scenes are reminiscent of works of contemporary artists in Northern Holland such as Dirck Hals, Willem Duyster, Pieter Codde and Hendrik Pot whose works Palamedesz. must have known. He shows originality in his treatment of light and tone in his pictures.

=== Portraits ===
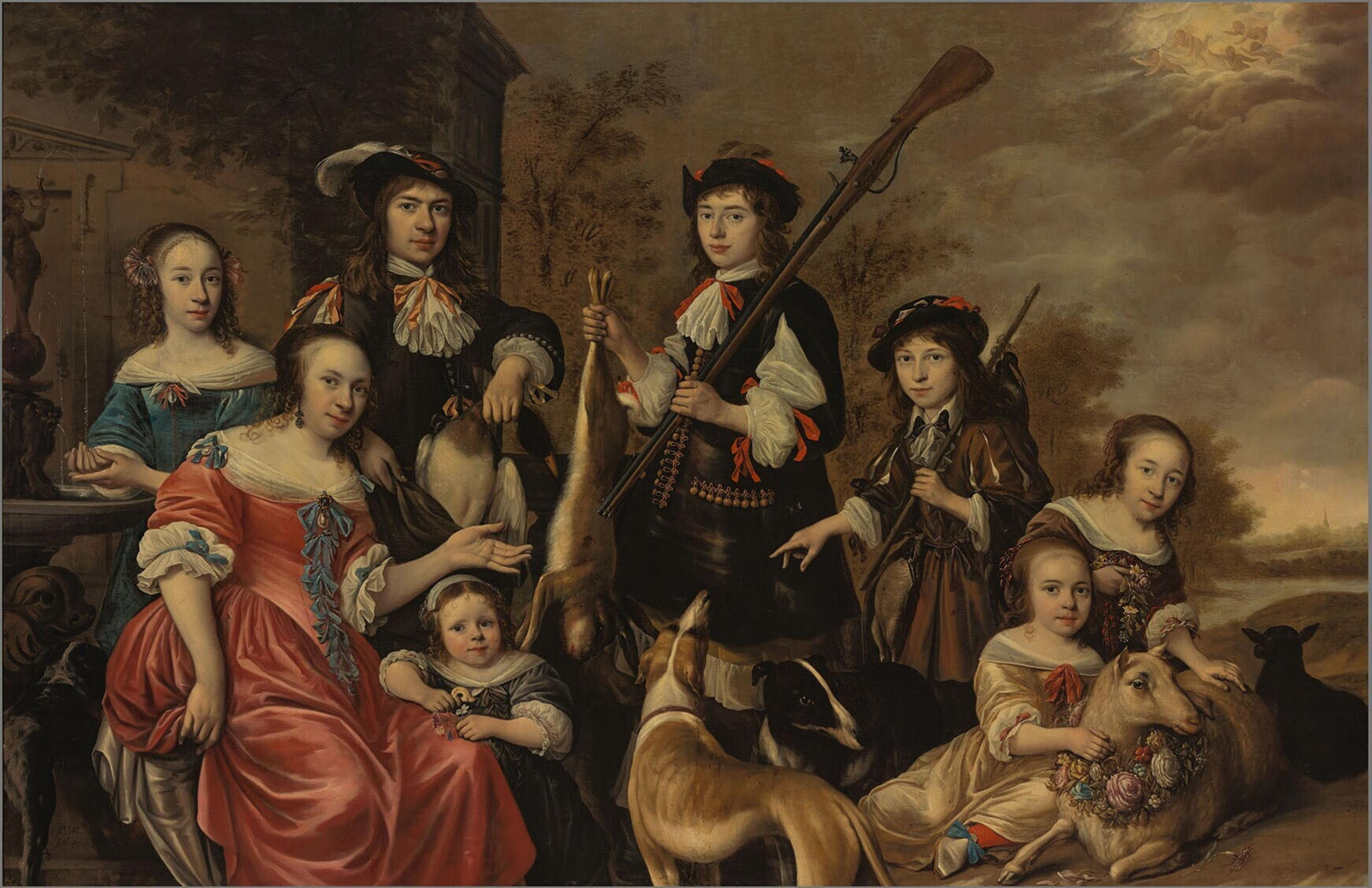
Family Portrait, 1665

Palamedesz. was a sought after portrait painter known for his portraits of individuals, married couples and families with dead game, hunting implements and hounds. His Family Portrait of 1635 (Royal Museum of Fine Arts Antwerp) recalls the Portrait of Anthonie Reyniers and His Family (Philadelphia Museum of Art) painted in 1631 by the Antwerp artist Cornelis de Vos. It is possible that his more dynamic treatment of family groups was due to his experience painting genre scenes which made him more aware of new ways of posing figures and arranging groups. This may explain the animated and lively character of the Family Portrait of 1635.

In some later portraits such as the Portrait of a Gentleman (private collection) he was able to cast off of the stiffness and sober demeanor typical of the sitters in his early works and make his sitters look suave. In his portraits from the 1650s he shows he was aware of developments in portraiture such as the fashionable and sophisticated imagery of Amsterdam portraitists like Bartholomeus van der Helst. An example is his Portrait of a richly dressed young man, half-length.

In the Family portrait of 1665 (Museum Boijmans Van Beuningen, Rotterdam) he depicts a family group of eight among various animals and dead game on the rolling terrain of a country estate not dissimilar to paintings of the Flemish artist Gonzales Coques.

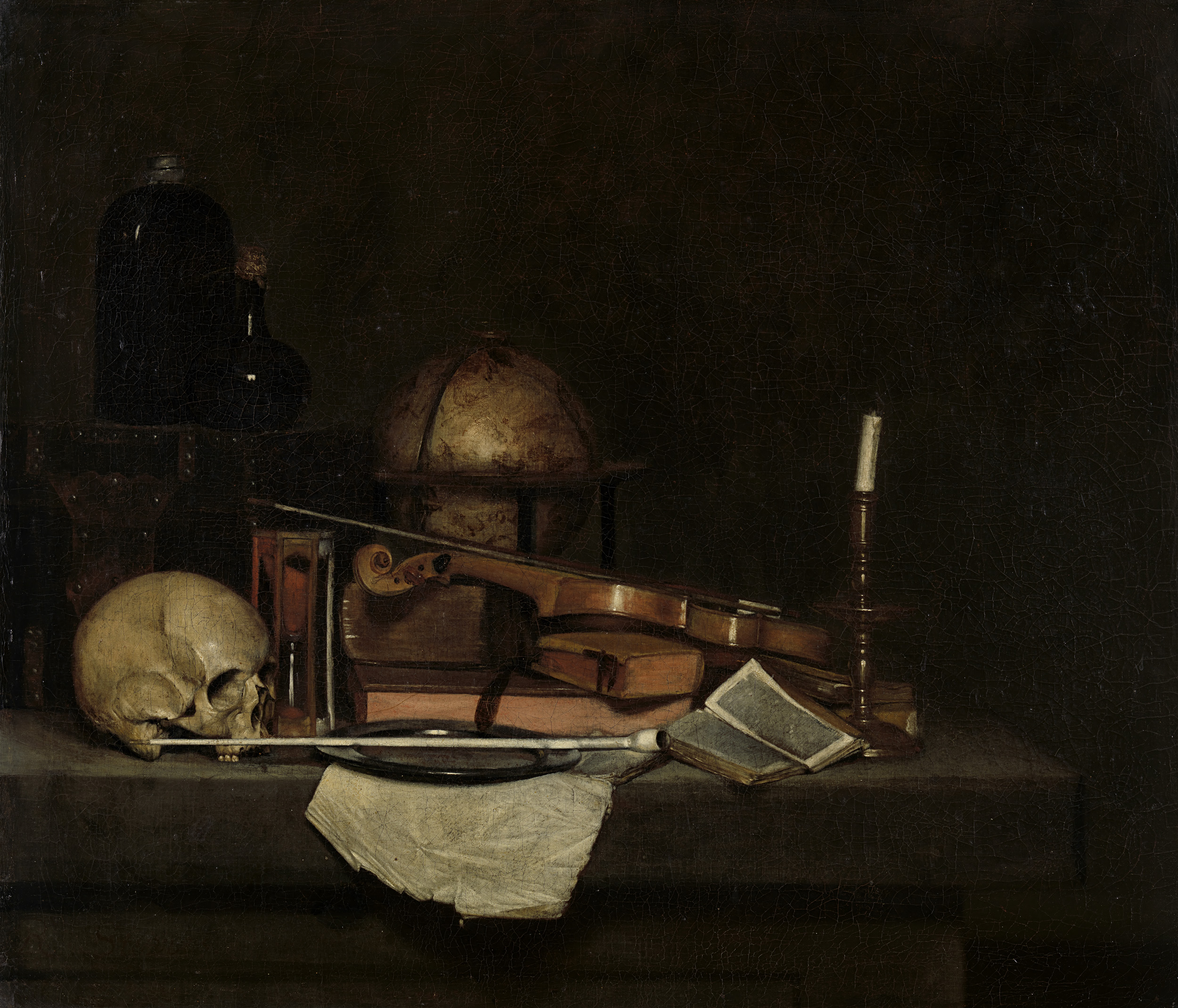
Vanitas still life

=== Other works ===
He also painted still lifes, including vanitas still lifes and kitchen pieces. He further possibly painted the staffage in a few views of church and palace interiors by Dirck van Delen and Anthonie de Lorme and in the Great Assembly of the States General in 1651 by Bartholomeus van Bassen.
