= Palamedes =

Palamedes may refer to:

- Palamedes (Arthurian legend), a Saracen Knight of the Round Table in the Arthurian legend
  - Palamedes (romance), a 13th-century French Arthurian romance named after the knight
- Palamedes (mythology), the son of Nauplius in Greek mythology
- Palamedes (video game), a 1990 video game
- 2456 Palamedes, an asteroid

== People ==
- Anthonie Palamedesz. (1601–1673), Dutch genre and portrait painter and brother of Palamedes Palamedesz. (I)
- Palamedes Palamedesz. (I) (1605–1638), Dutch battle scene painter and brother of Anthonie Palamedesz.

== See also ==
- Palamede, the Italian form
- Palamède (disambiguation), the French form
