= Anthonie de Lorme =

Dutch painter

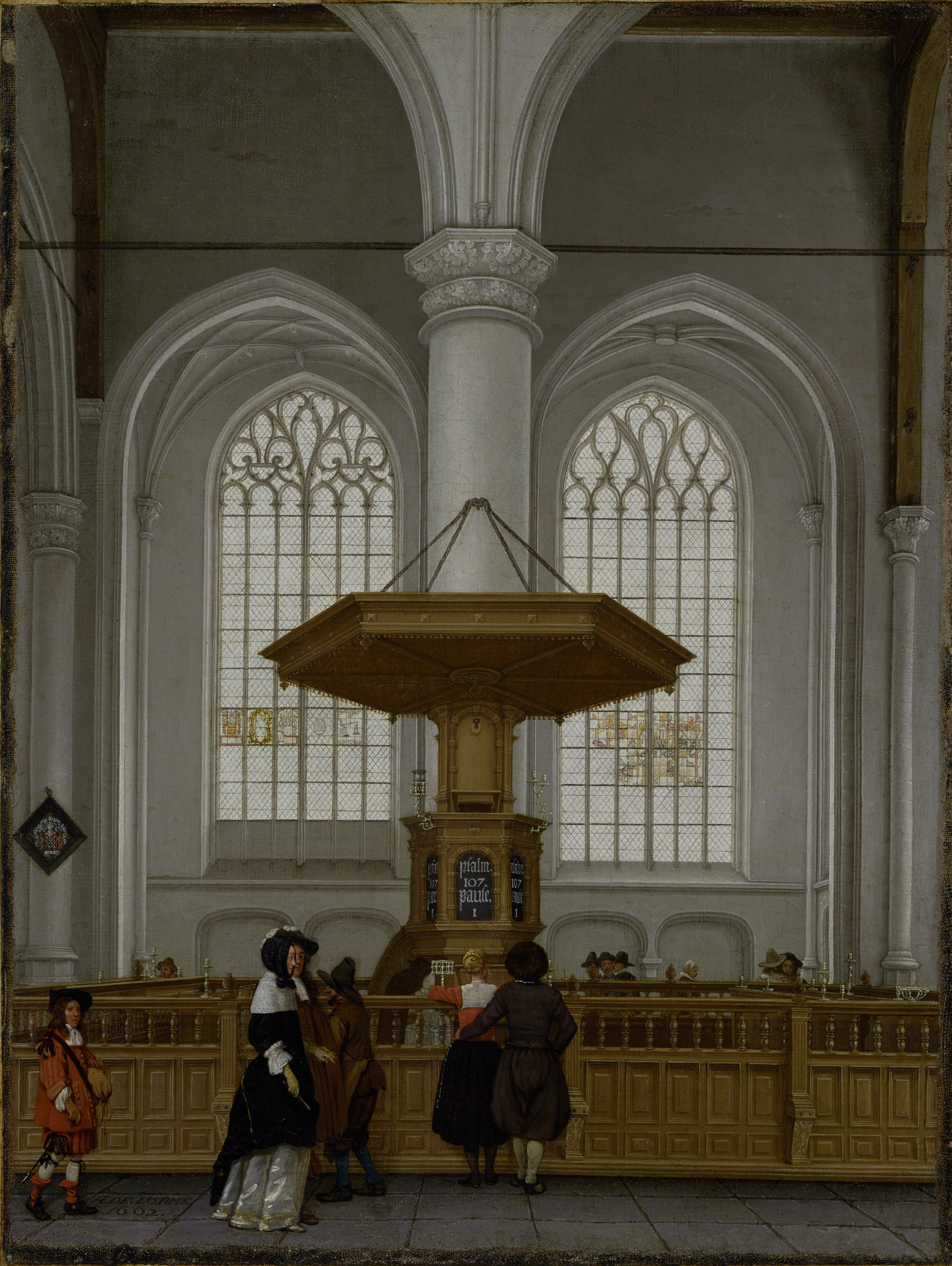
Interior of the Church of Saint Lawrence, Rotterdam, collaboration with Ludolf de Jongh, 1662

Anthonie de Lorme (Tournai 1610 or between 1600 and 1605 – Rotterdam, 1673) was a painter known for his depictions of interiors of existing or imaginary churches. Born in the Spanish Netherlands, he spent his entire career in the Dutch Republic. He regularly collaborated with Anthonie Palamedesz. and Ludolf de Jongh who painted the staffage in his interior scenes.

== Life ==
De Lorme was born in Tournai, the Spanish Netherlands, as the son of the broker Augustijn Delhorme from Tournai (died before 1628) and Marie Beghin (died 1644). His parents were married in 1588 in Antwerp. The de Lorme family were living in Rotterdam from 1612.

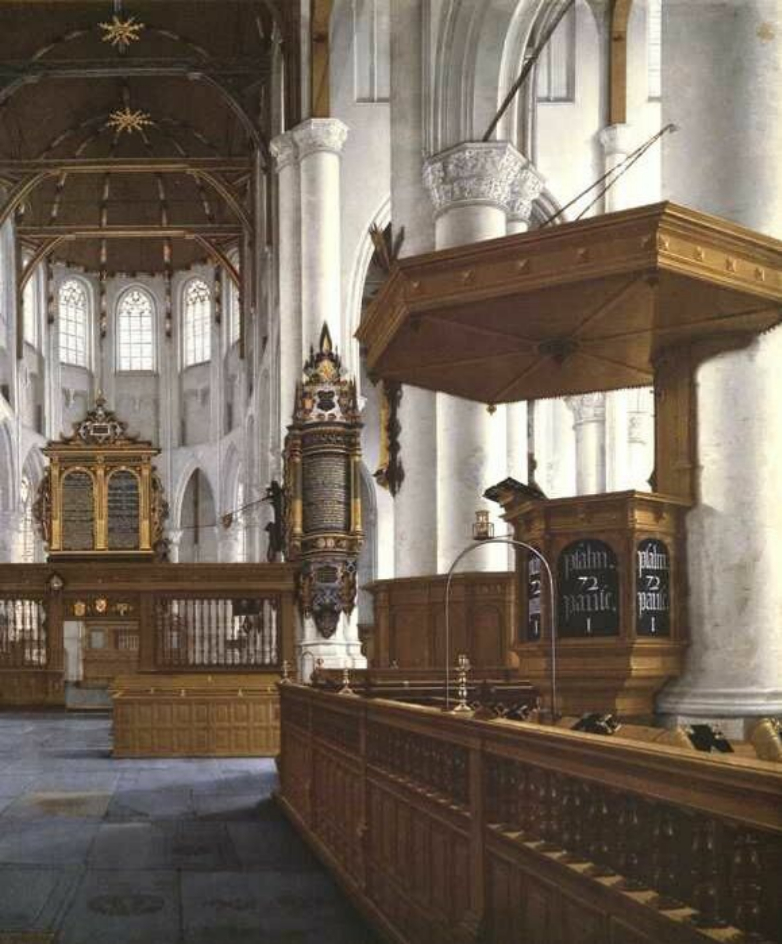
Interior of the Church of Saint Lawrence, Rotterdam, 1655

It is not clear with which master de Lorme studied perspective painting: the obscure Jan van der Vucht or the more famous Bartholomeus van Bassen. The only old source - the Index of Painters compiled by doctor Jan Sysmus from Amsterdam between 1669 and 1678 - states that Anthonie de Lorme was a good painter of peasant fairs and of churches, and was a pupil of Jan van der Vucht. As with other artist entries in the Index, there is doubt about these remarks: firstly, because there are no known peasant fair paintings by de Lorme and it is unlikely he ever painted them in view of his known output of church interiors. Secondly, Jan van der Vucht was born in 1603, while de Lorme around 1610 or even earlier around 1605 according to some sources. This would mean the two artists were of approximately the same age, making a master-pupil relationship rather unlikely. The two artists were known to each other as de Lorme acted several times as a witness for van der Vucht, but is this does not prove a master-pupil relationship.

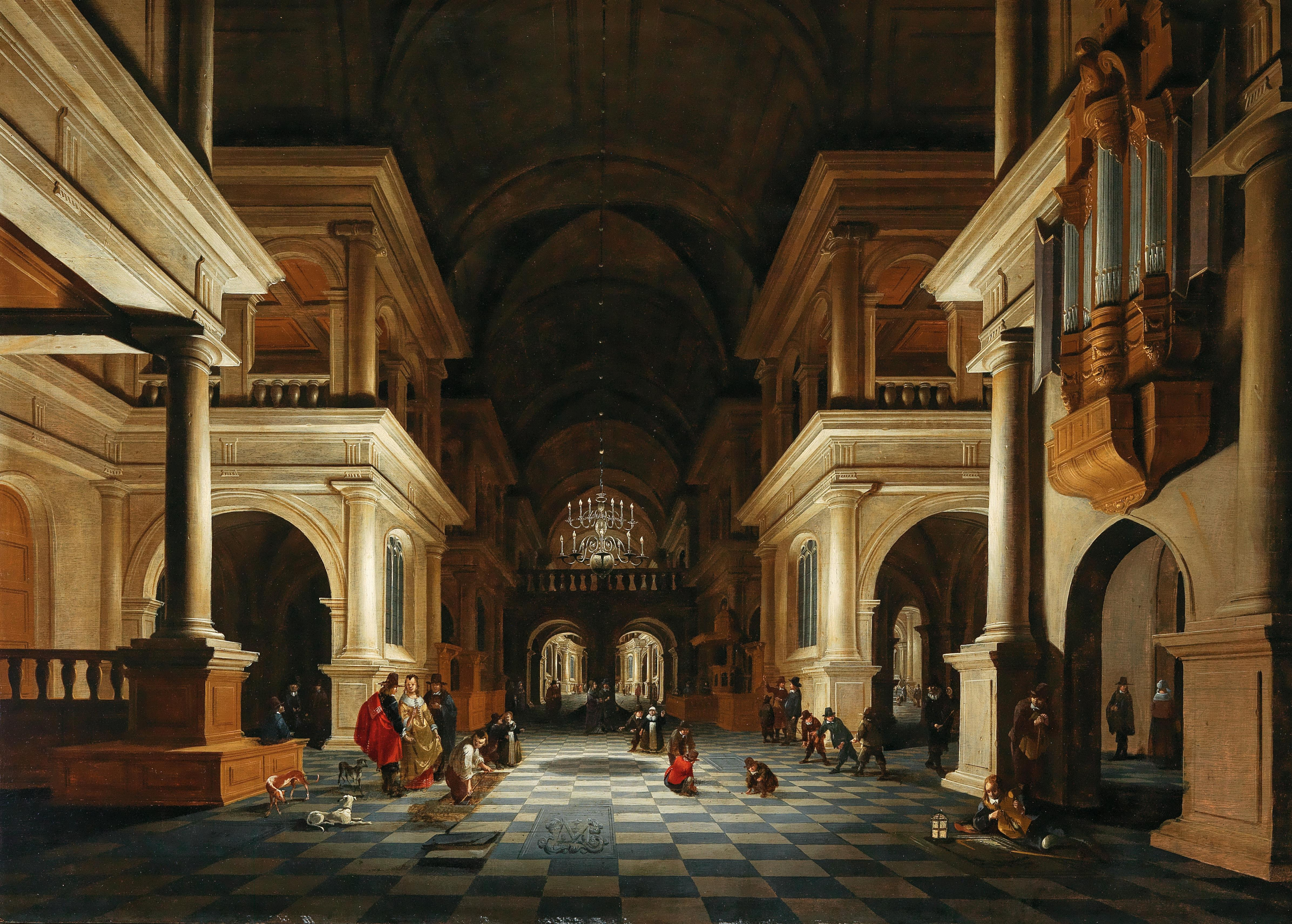
Church interior with elegant figures, 1632

Possibly van der Vucht and de Lorme got to know each other because they were pupils of van Bassen in Delft around the same time. This would explain the similarities between their works. The earliest dated painting known by de Lorme from 1638 (at Sotheby’s London on 17 April 1996) shows van Bassen's influence. The next known dated work from 1641 (Hamburger Kunsthalle) is more similar to van der Vucht, who had died already in 1637.

He was active as an artist as early as 1627. He married in Rotterdam on 12 May 1647 to Maertje Floris van der Werf (died 1671). At the time of his marriage he lived on the Botersloot in the centre of Rotterdam. He made his will in 1649. In the will he declares he had a shop selling linen, stockings, candles, ribbons etc.

He died in Rotterdam and was buried in June 1673.

== Works ==
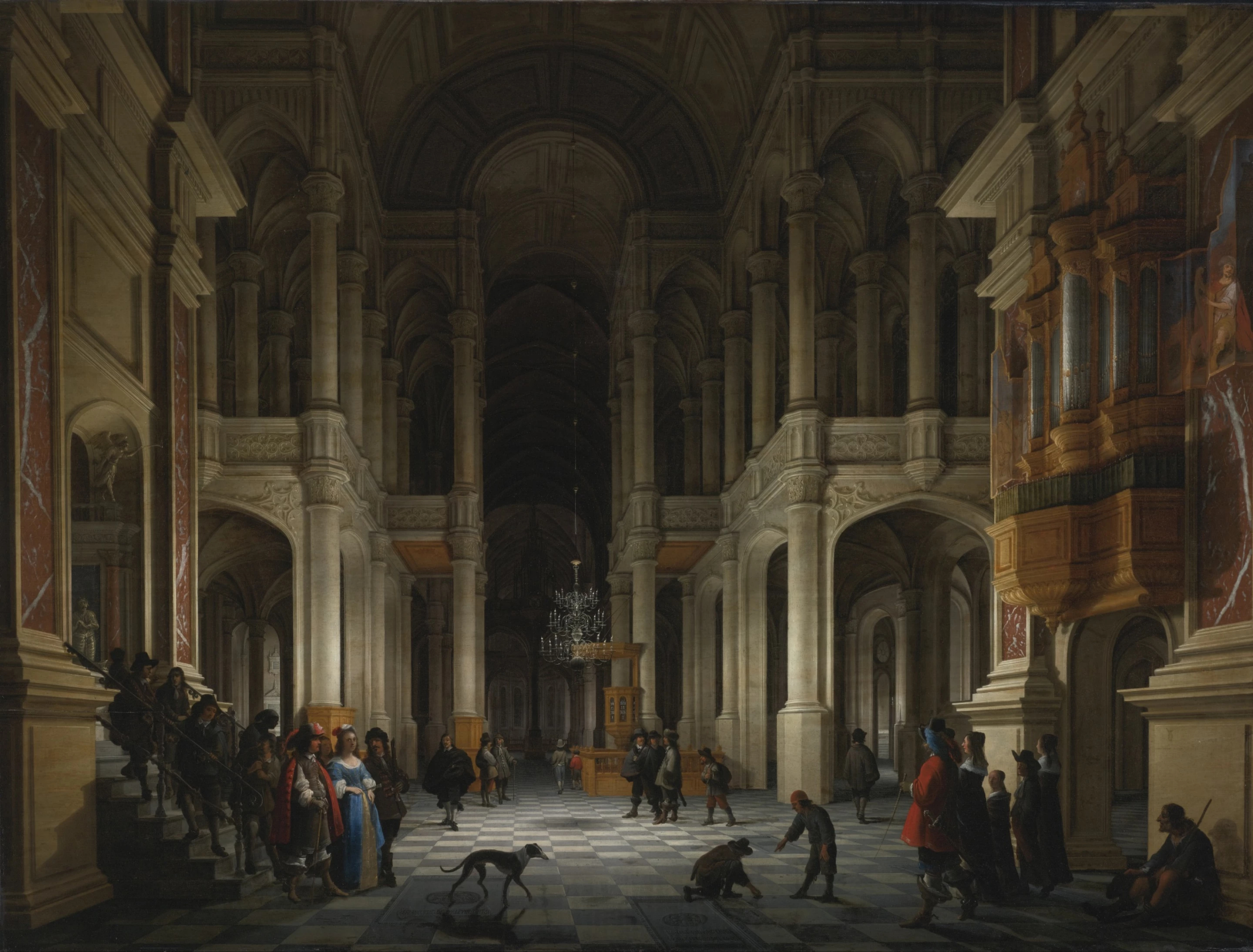
Interior of a Renaissance church at night with an elegant couple entering, collaboration with Anthonie Palamedesz.

He is only known for his church interiors. In his early career he mainly painted imaginary church interiors, to which he at times added architectural elements borrowed from actual buildings. Around 1652 he started to paint simple and accurate depictions of local churches populated with a few figures. This shift reflects possibly the influence of painters in nearby Delft. His church interiors of the 1650s are bathed in light and atmosphere and offer a very close-up view. He painted the Church of Saint Lawrence in Rotterdam at least 17 times. His paintings were used by the restorers of the church after World War II.

In the 1660s De Lorme abandoned his realistic style for a more decorative treatment, by using the church's architectural elements to create an elegant geometric pattern rather than an objective view. De Lorme also made many capriccios of classical churches at night.

The figures in his church paintings were painted by other local painters including Anthonie Palamedesz. and Ludolf de Jongh.
