= Palamède =

Palamède may refer to:

- Palamède de Forbin (died 1508), Provençal lord and minister
- Le Palamède, a former chess periodical

== See also ==
- Palamedes (disambiguation)
