= Jacob Jansz van Velsen =

Dutch painter (1597–1656)

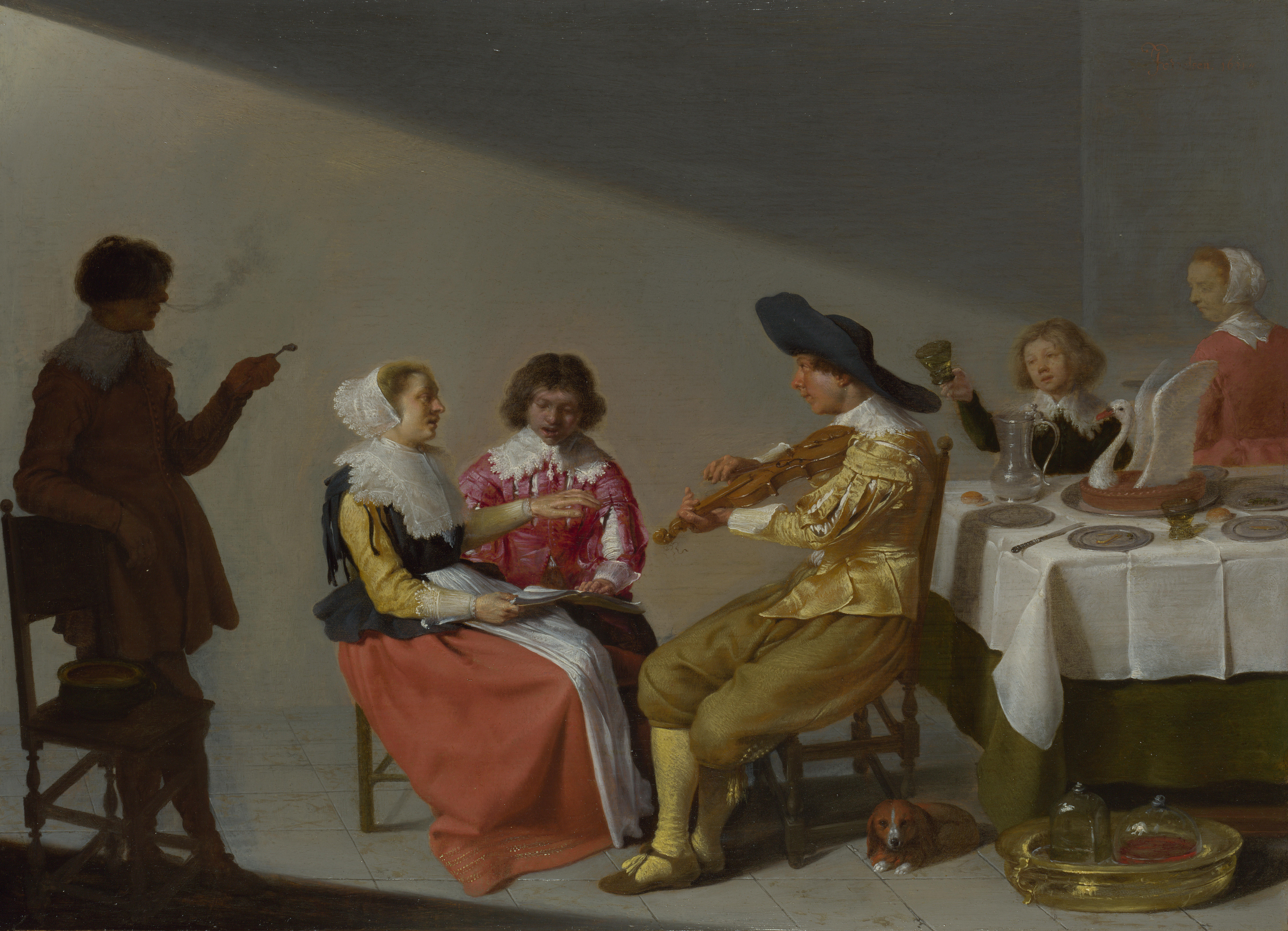
Jacob van Velsen - A Musical Party

Jacob Jansz. van Velsen (1597 in Delft – 1656 in Amsterdam), was a Dutch Golden Age painter.

== Biography ==
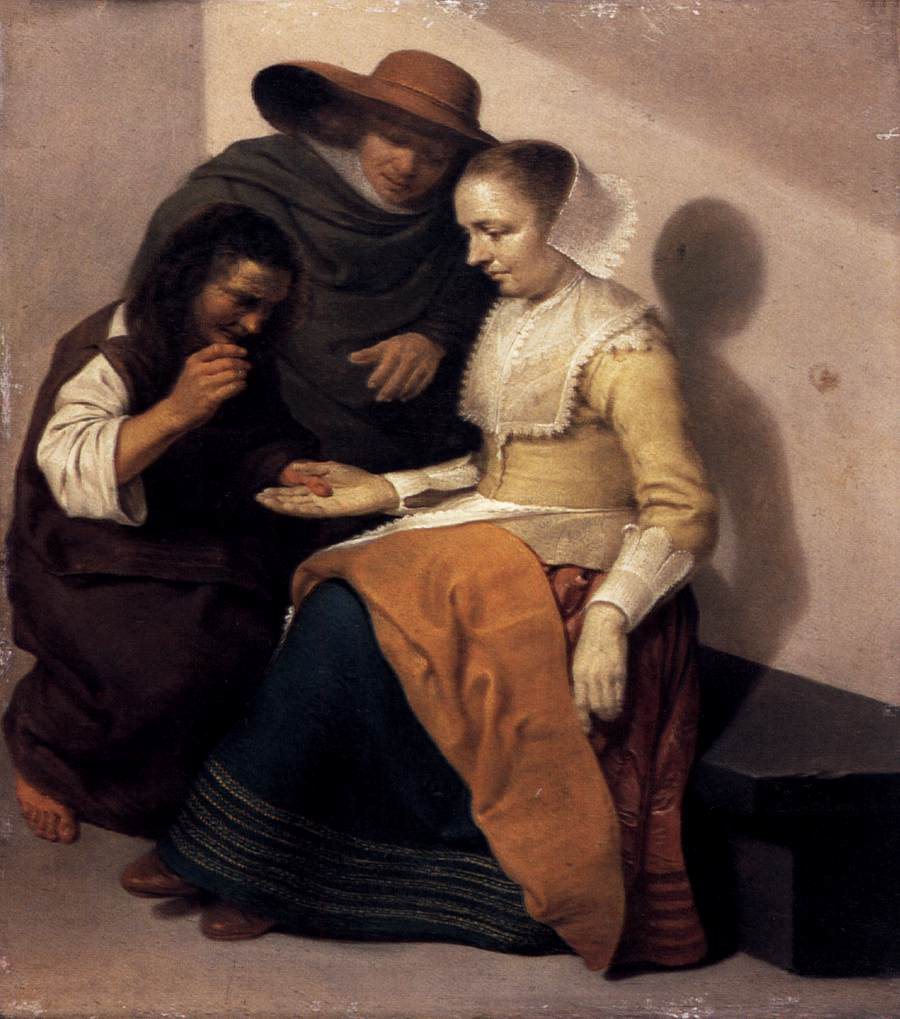
The Fortune Teller, 1631, Louvre

According to the RKD Jacob influenced Willem Cornelisz Duyster and is known for genre works and military pieces, most notably conversation pieces in the manner of Pieter Codde and Dirck Hals. One of his paintings was engraved by Pierre Aveline in 1755.

== Exhibition catalogue ==
- Vermeer and The Delft School, a full text exhibition catalog from The Metropolitan Museum of Art, which contains material on Jacob Jansz van Velsen
