= Palamede =

Palamede is an Italian masculine given name derived from the Greek Palamedes. Notable people with the name include:

- Palamede Bozzuto (fl. 1381–1382), lord of Muro Lucano
- Palamede Gattilusio (c. 1389–1455), Lord of Ainos
