= Palamedes Palamedesz. (I) =

Dutch painter

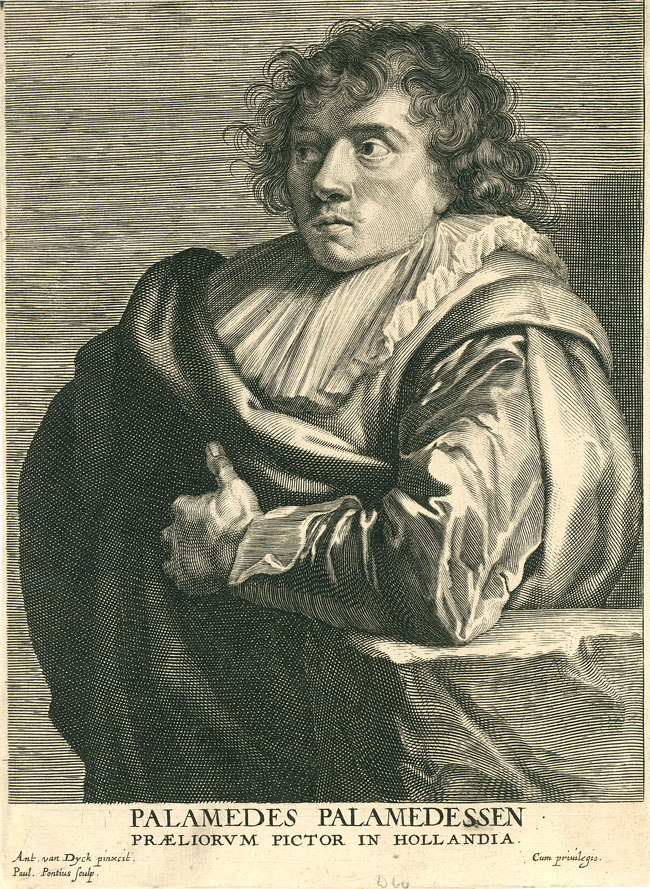
Palamedes Palamedesz by Paulus Pontius after Anthony van Dyck

Palamedes Palamedesz. (I), Palamedes Palamedesz. the Elder or Palamedes Palamedesz. Stevers (bapt. 6 August 1605, Leith – buried 26 March 1638, Delft), was a Dutch painter, and younger brother of Anthonie Palamedesz. He is known mainly for his battle scenes and equestrian portraits.

== Life ==
He was born in Leith, Scotland as the son of Palamedes Willemsz. Stevens and Marie Arsene (in Dutch, called Maeijken van Naerssen) and was baptized on 6 August 1605. His father was a sculptor, stone cutter and court artist who was likely Flemish. His father carved semi-precious stone such as jasper, porphyry, and agate into vases and practised other decorative arts. He was in the service of the Scottish King James VI and possibly traveled with the King to London when he was crowned King of England as James I of England.

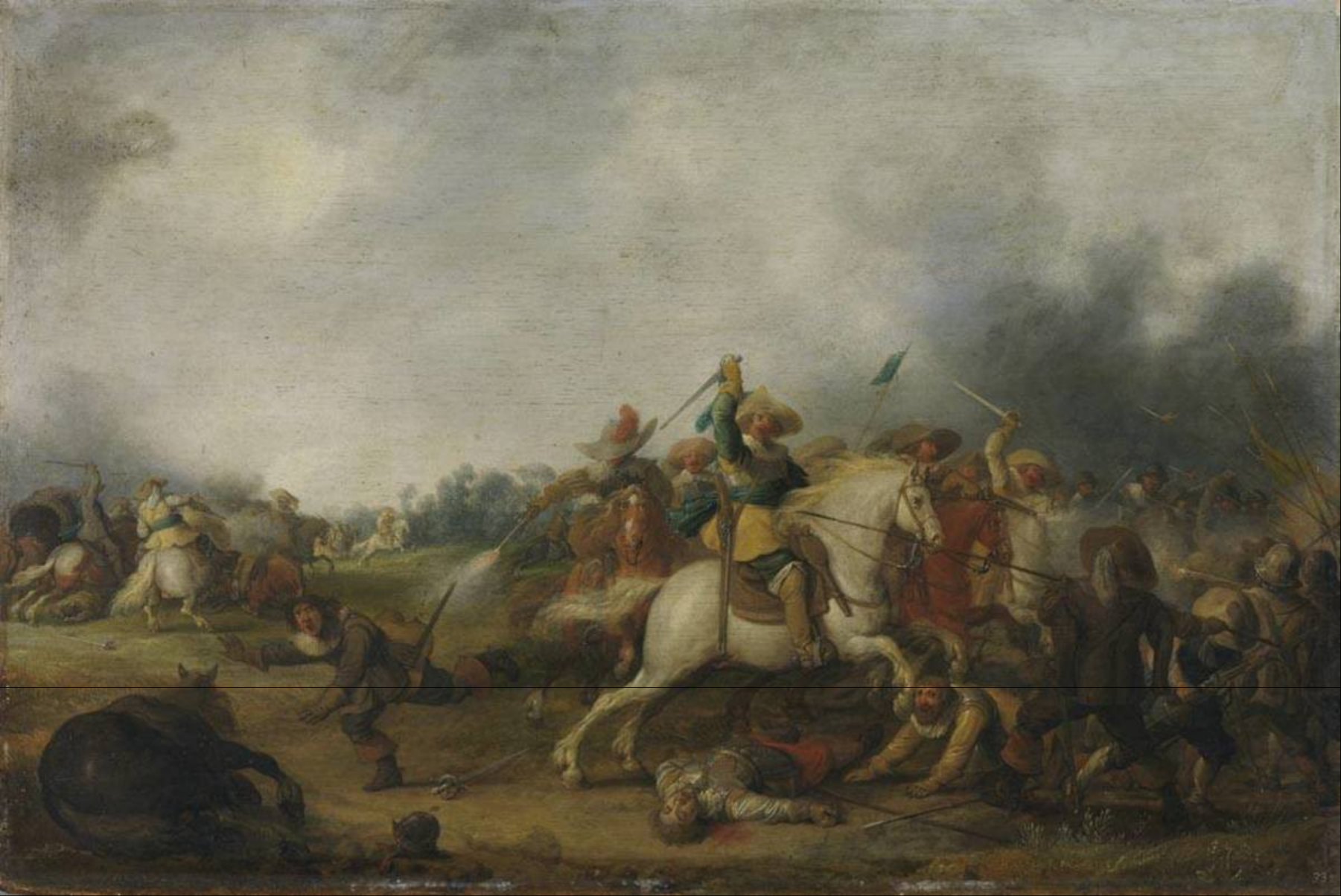
Cavalry skirmish

His father had married Maeijken van Naerssen in Leith on 6 June 1601. The couple had three children: Guilliaem (or William) (1601-1688), who became a tailor, Anthonie (1602-1673), who became a painter, and Palamedes. After Palamedes was born, the family left Scotland and established themselves in Delft in the Dutch Republic where the boys grew up. The early biographer Arnold Houbraken mentions that he was so talented that he became a master without having had a master, and only practised by copying the works of Esaias van de Velde, which he did so well that he became very well known. Contrary to this story, it is more likely that he was taught by his older brother Anthonie.

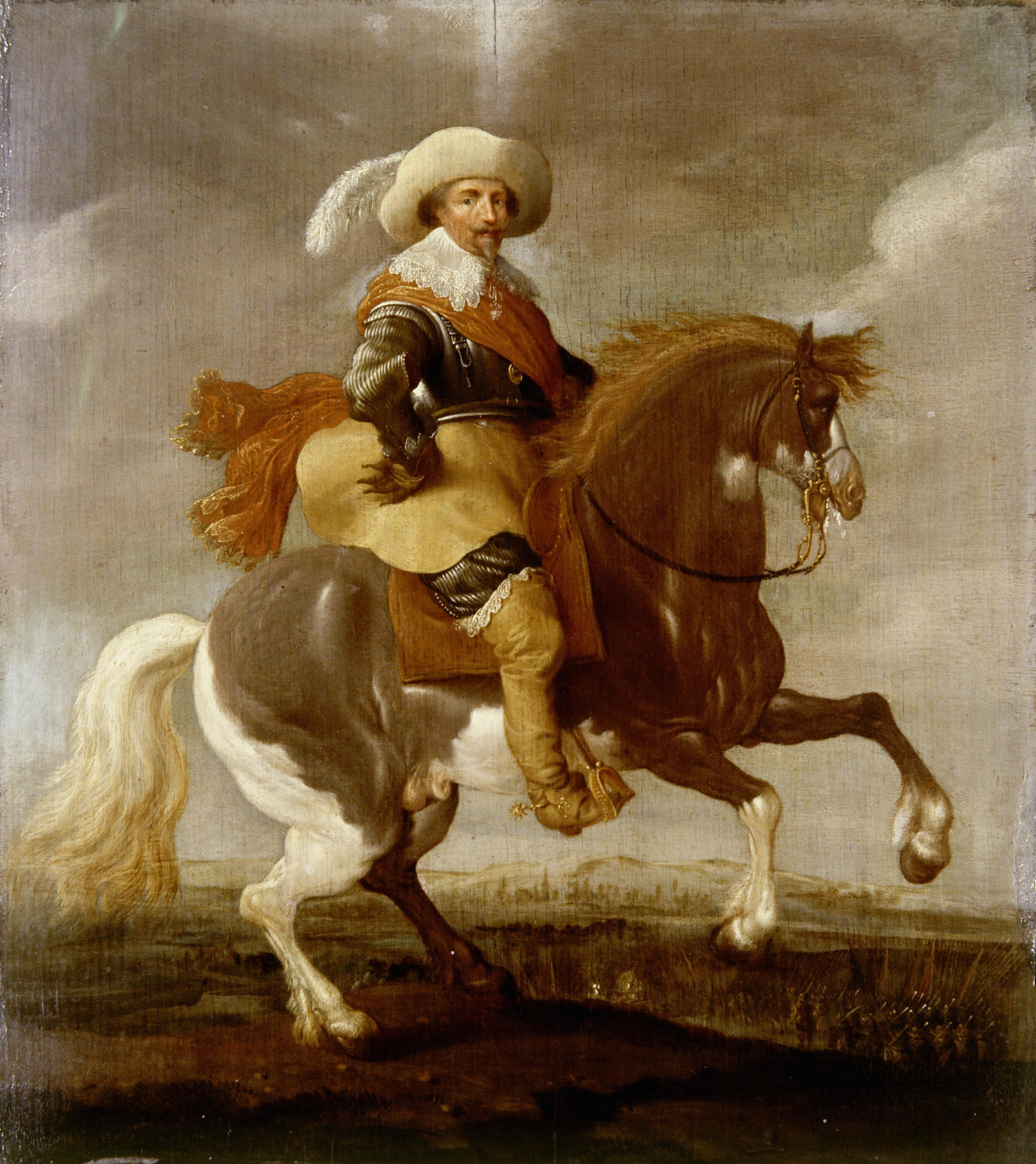
Frederik Hendrik on horseback

He became a member of the Guild of St. Luke of Delft in 1627. When Palamedes and his brother Anthonie were registered with the Guild, they received the discounted entry fee reserved for residents of the city, which suggests that their father had lived in Delft before leaving for Scotland, possibly as a Protestant fugitive from the Spanish Inquisition in his native Flanders.

His brother became a respected portrait and genre painter. Palamedes was described as short, hunchbacked and ugly. He married Maria Ewouts van Schravesande in Delft on 19 January 1630 (died 1695). His wife was the daughter of a wealthy family. The pair were the parents of Palamedes Palamedesz. (III) (1631-1683) who was a painter.

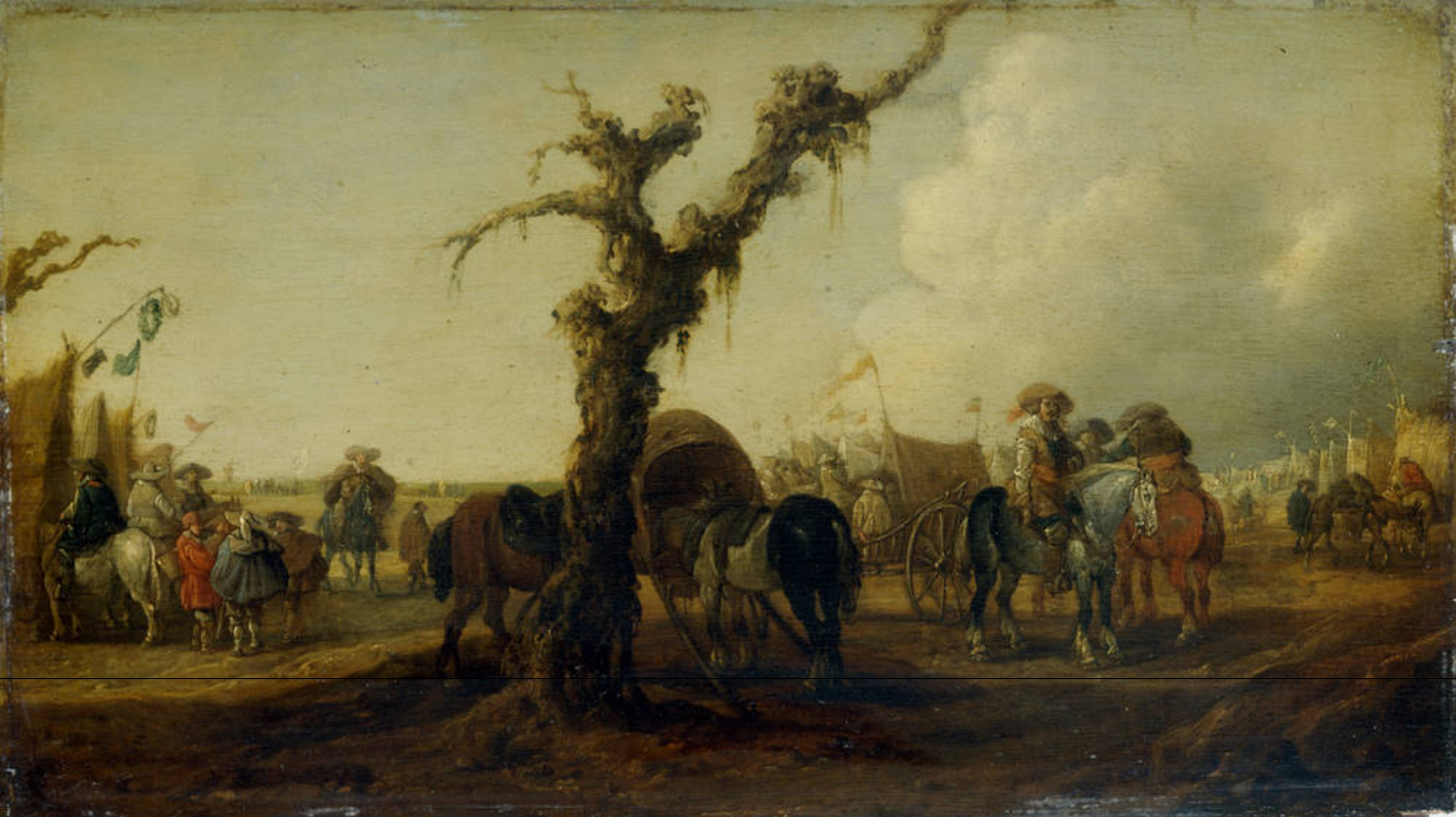
Military camp

He spent time in Antwerp in 1631 and returned to Delft in 1632. His motto was "nog eerst te zullen beginnen" ("yet to start first"). He died at age 33 and was buried on 26 March 1638 in Delft.

== Work ==
Palamedesz. primarily painted battle scenes of cavalry engagements and soldiers in military camps. He may have painted some equestrian portraits and genre scenes.
