= Pieter Codde =

Dutch painter (1599–1678)

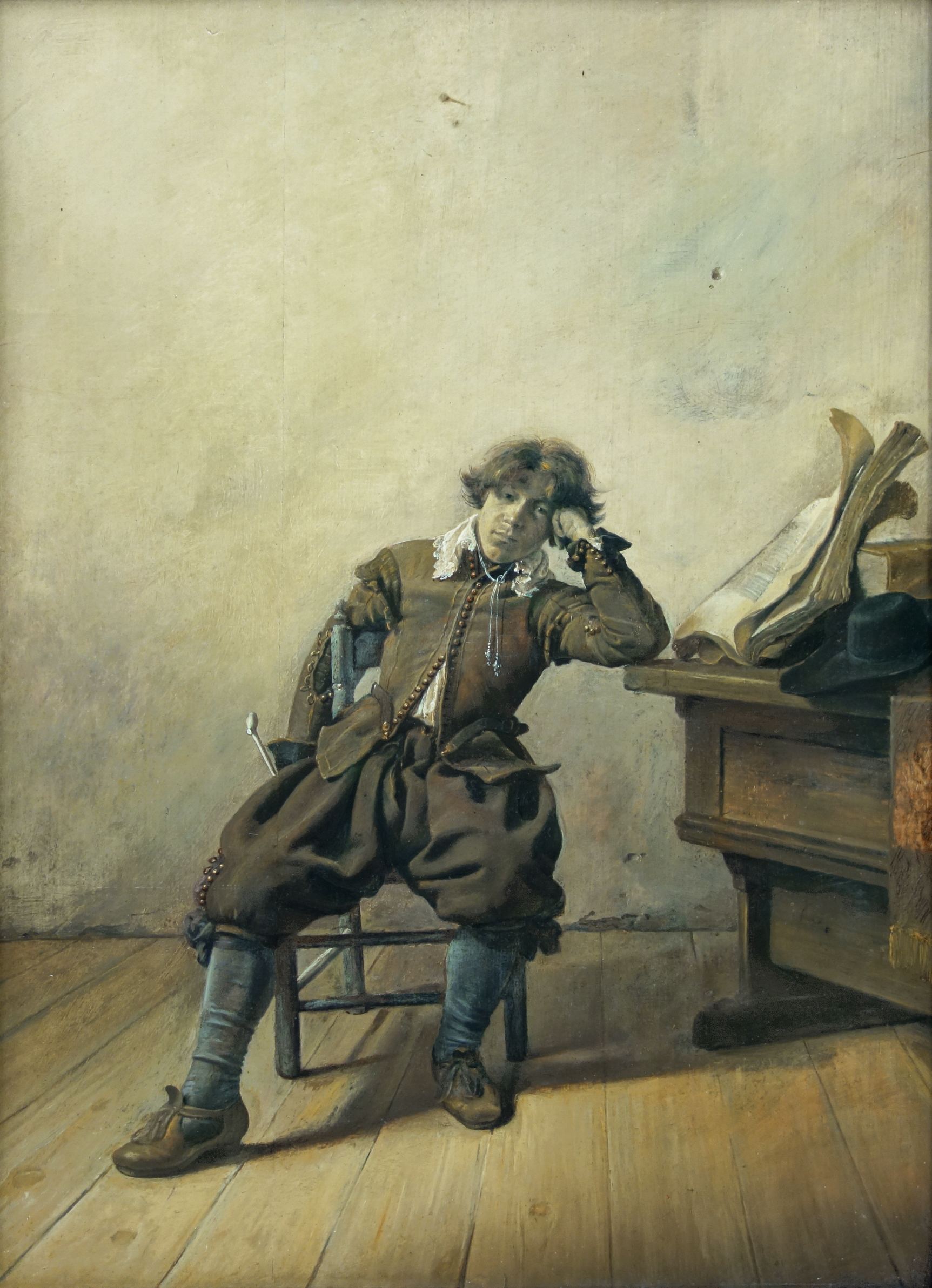
Pieter Codde, Young Scholar in his Study, c. 1630-5

Pieter Jacobsz Codde (December 11, 1599 – October 12, 1678) was a Dutch painter of genre works, guardroom scenes and portraits.

== Life ==
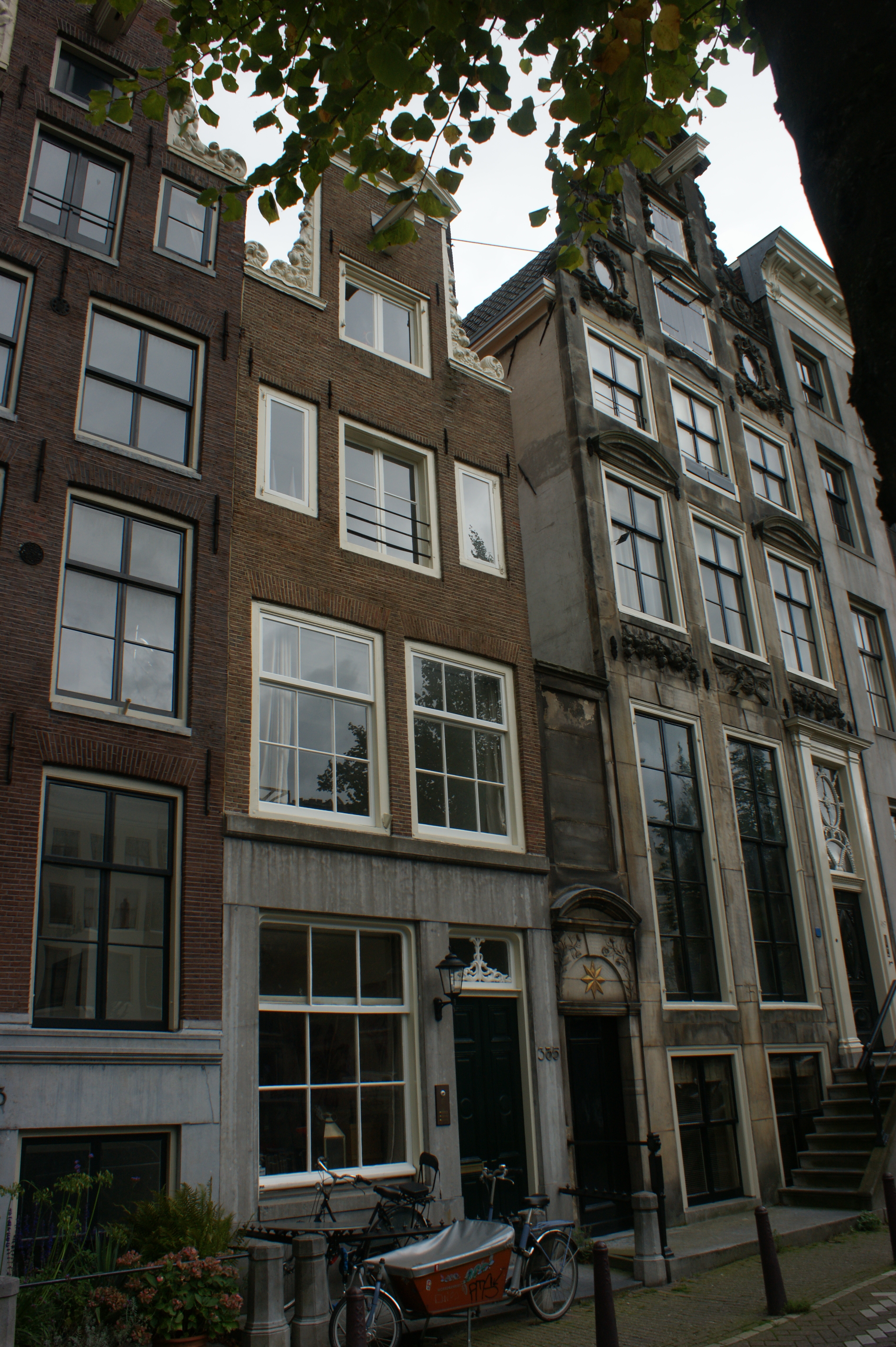
Keizersgracht 385, the house he bought in 1657.

Codde was a technically skilled painter. He is said to have studied with Frans Hals, but it is more likely that his training was with the portrait painter, inn-keeper, actor and art-dealer Barent van Someren (1572–1632) or possibly with Cornelis van der Voort (1576–1624). In 1623 he married the 18-year-old Marritje Arents. In the summer of 1625, at a party organized by Van Someren on his estate, Codde got into a fight with his friend, the artist Cornelis Duyster. It ended with bloodshed as the two hit each other in the face with jars. By 1628 Codde was living in the Sint Antoniesbreestraat, then a fashionable street in Amsterdam with many painters. In 1636 the couple divorced after he was accused of raping the maid; because nothing could be proved he was only locked up for one night. His wife went to live with Pieter Potter, their neighbor and the father of the painter Paulus Potter. In 1657 he purchased a house on the Keizersgracht for 5,000 guilders, where he lived for the rest of his life. When Pieter Codde died, his maid, Barendje Willems, inherited most of his property.

== Works ==
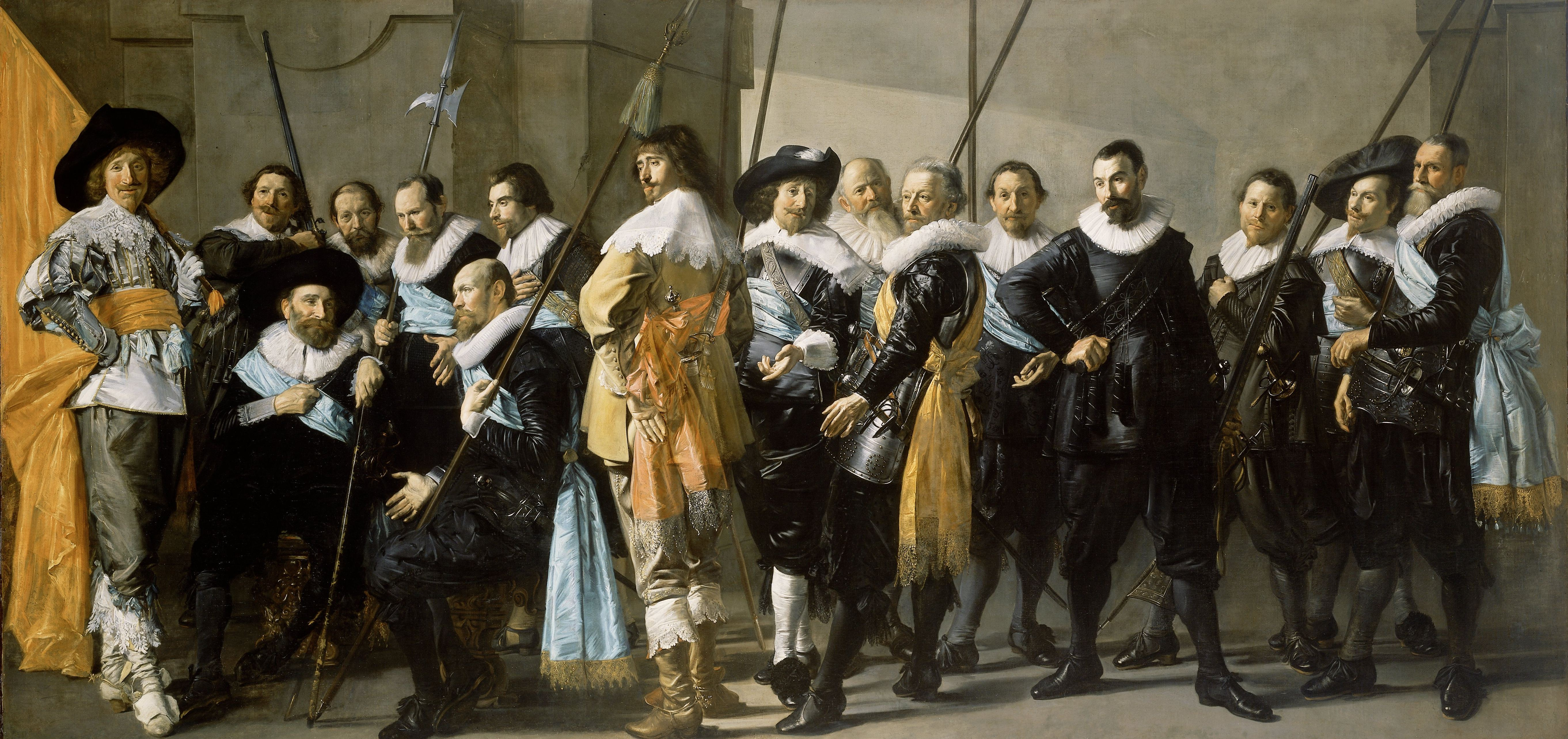
Pieter Codde, De Magere Compagnie - The company of Captain Reinier Reael and Lieutenant Cornelis Michielsz. Blaeuw, 1637

His earliest known work is a piece from 1626, Portrait of a Young Man, now in the Ashmolean. Most of his best-remembered works were executed in Amsterdam and are small-scale paintings. They are distinctive in their silvery-gray tonalities, and many are musically themed, such as his first known genre work, Dancing Lesson (Louvre) from 1627, Musical Company of 1639, The Lute Player (Philadelphia Museum of Art) and, Concert, a piece now in the Uffizi Gallery. The other piece by Codde in the Uffizi is a genre work, Conversation. Codde also painted historical religious works, such as his Adoration of the Shepherds, from 1645, in the Rijksmuseum of Amsterdam.

Though it is unknown whether he studied with Hals, his style is undoubtedly similar in some respects. He was commissioned in 1637 to complete an unfinished work of Hals, the schutterstuk called Officers of the Company of the Amsterdam Crossbow Civic Guard Under Captain Reynier Reael and Lieutenant Cornelis Michielsz. Blaeuw. While the choice of Codde to complete this work by Hals was not an obvious selection at the time, Codde's work is recognizably smoother. It is thought that Hals completed only the left half of the composition, with the third, fifth and seventh faces from the right; the rest was executed by Codde. The piece has become known as, The Meagre Company, from comments by later viewers in the Rijksmuseum who observed that the men painted well over a decade later by Rembrandt in his 'The Night Watch' were much fatter.

Codde's pupil was Willem Duyster, who was about the same age, and Jacob Duck was influenced by him. Simon Kick was their brother-in-law. Adriaen Brouwer, Gerard Terborch, and Pieter Quast also belonged to this group of painters that developed the style of genre scene. Codde may have been related to a poet with almost the same name, Pieter Adriaensz. Codde.

== Sources ==
- Playter, C. B. 1972, Willem Duyster and Pieter Codde: The 'Duystere Wereldt' of Dutch Genre Painting, c. 1625-1635, Dissertation, Harvard University.
