= Jacob Duck =

Dutch painter and etcher

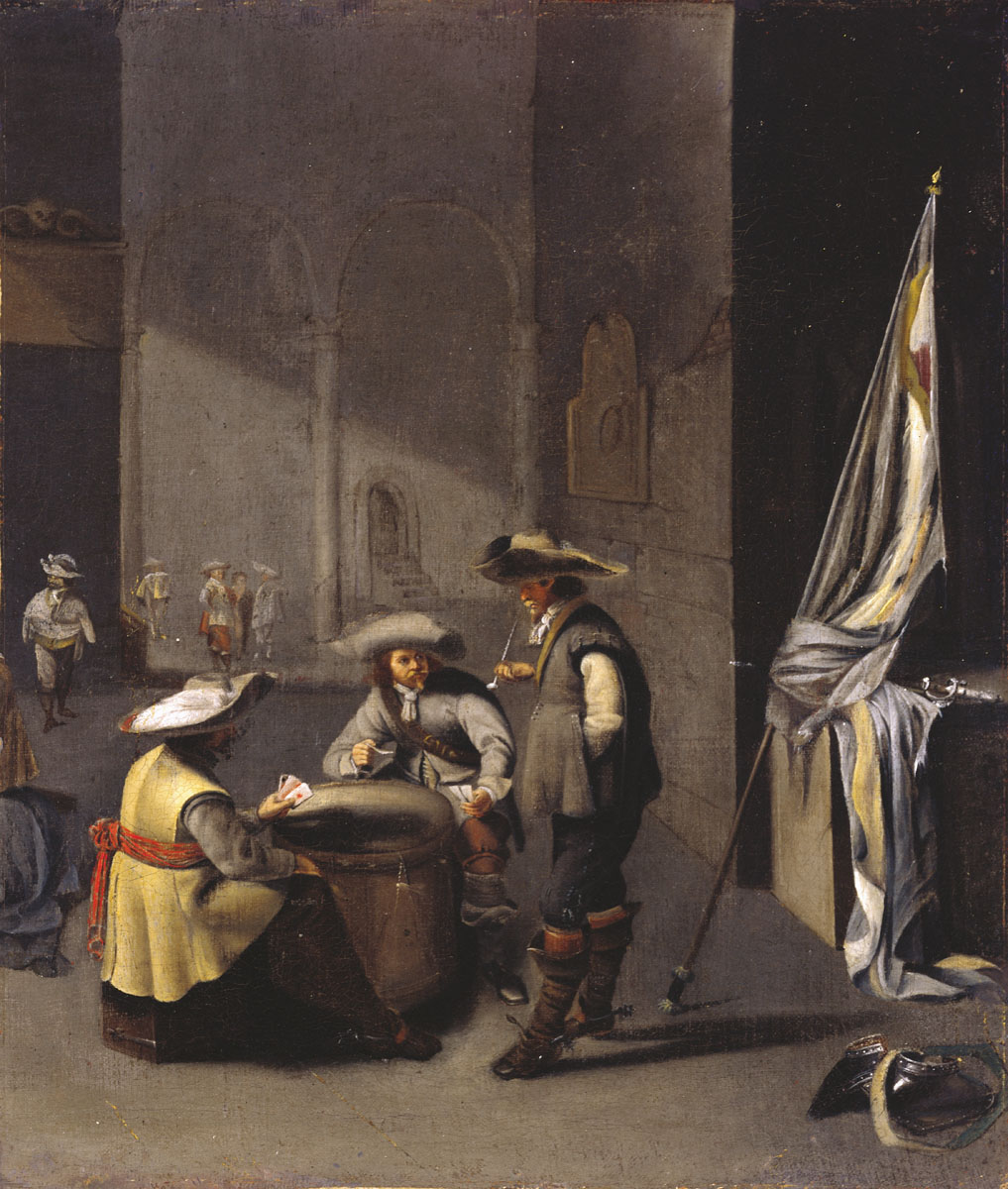
Jacob Duck, Guard House with soldiers and a pack of cards, Szépművészeti Múzeum

Jacob Duck (also Ducq, Duyck, Duick, Duc) (1600 – buried 22/28 January 1667) was a Dutch painter and etcher.

Duck is thought to have been born in Utrecht. From 1611, he was trained in Utrecht to become a goldsmith, in which craft he became a master in 1619. From 1621 he took drawing lessons from Joost Cornelisz Droochsloot. He was primarily active in Utrecht, but between 1636 and 1646 also in Haarlem, while between 1656 and 1660 he lived in The Hague. In 1661 he returned to Utrecht, where he died and was buried at the monastery of St. Mary Magdalene.

Duck primarily painted soldiers, figures, and everyday scenes. His works reside at many notable museums, including the Hermitage Museum.
