= Simon Kick =

Dutch Golden Age painter

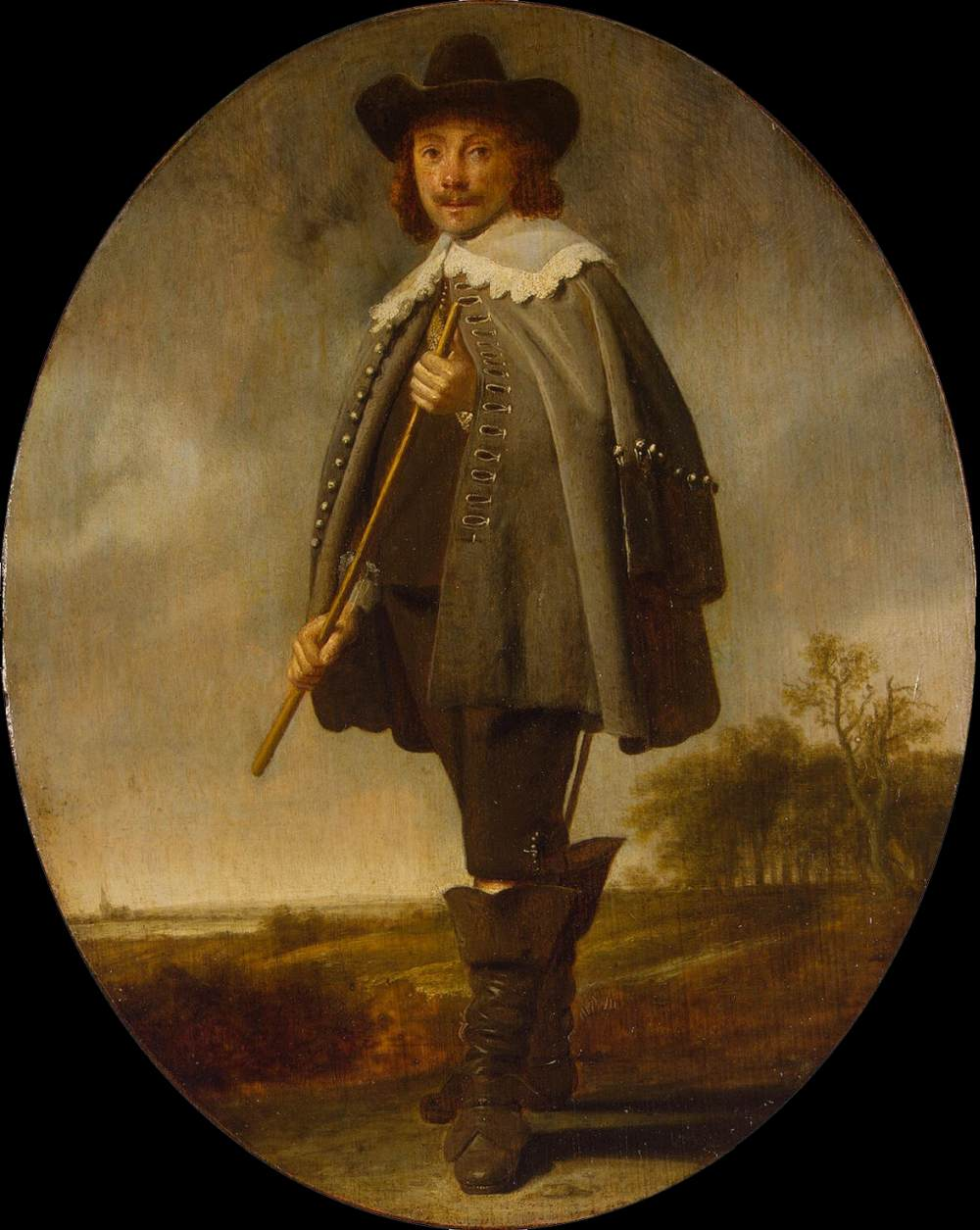
- Born: 1603; Delft, Holland, Netherlands
- Died: 1652 (aged 48–49); Amsterdam, Netherlands
- Resting place: Amsterdam, Holland, Netherlands
- Occupation: Artist
- Spouse: Christina Cornelis Duyster
- Children: 7
- Family: Cornelis Kick

Simon Kick (1603, Delft – 1652, Amsterdam), was a Dutch Golden Age painter.

== Gallery ==
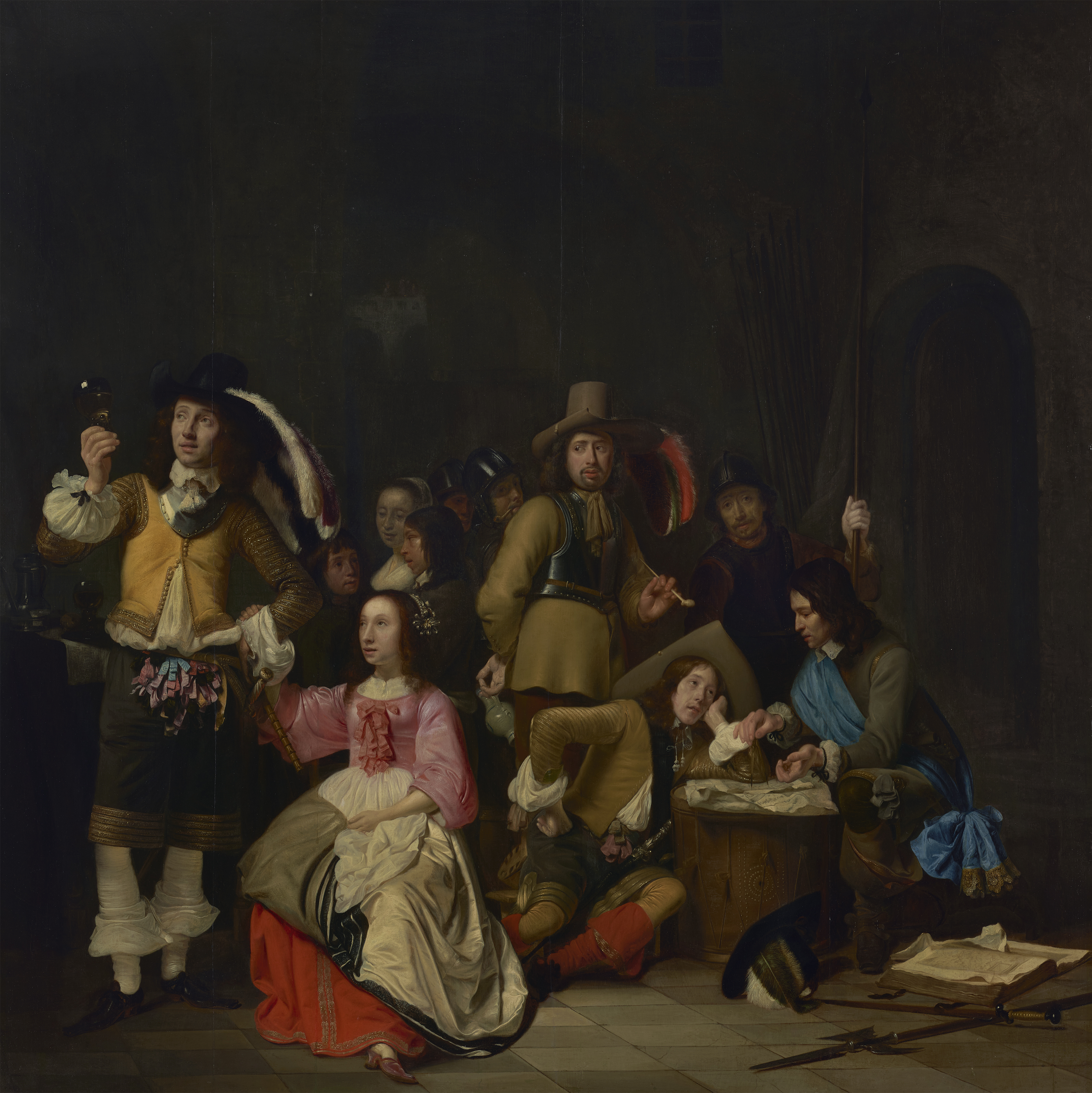
Company of Soldiers in a Guardroom

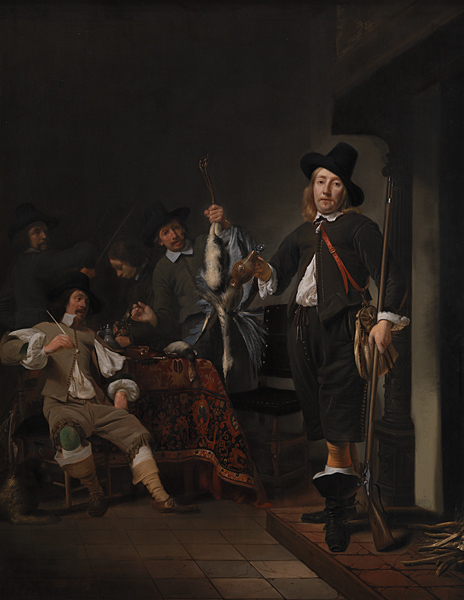
Homecoming of a Fowling Party

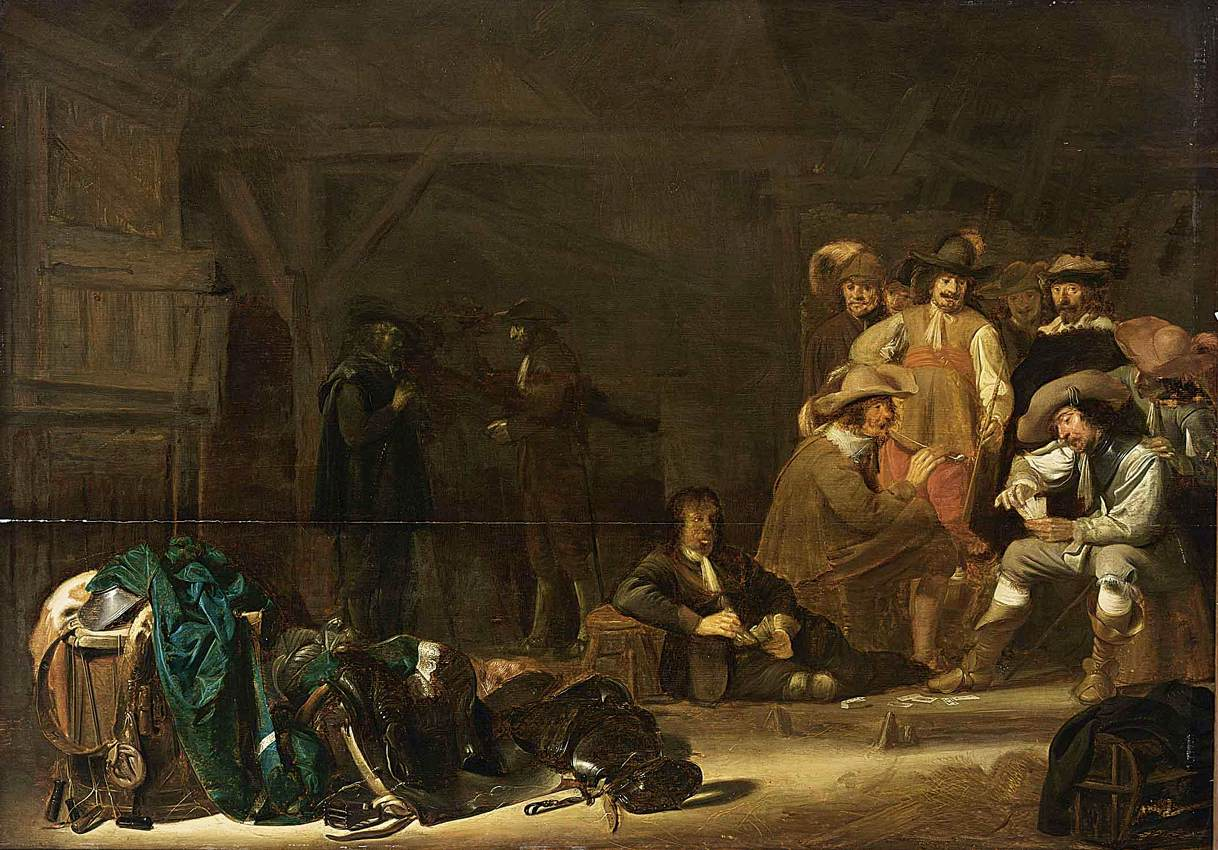
Soldiers in a barn

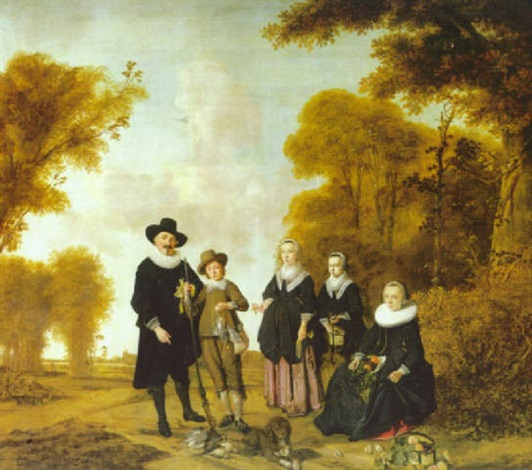
Le Retour du Jeune Chasseur

== Biography ==
According to the RKD he was the son of the Delft varnish worker Willem Kick. He married Christina (Stijntje) Duyster, who he got engaged to on the same day that her brother, the painter Willem Duyster got engaged to Simon's sister Margrieta. Simon and Stijntje became the parents of the painter Cornelis Kick. He is known for portraits and genre works with soldiers and horsemen.
