= Willem Cornelisz Duyster =

Dutch Golden Age painter

Soldiers beside a Fireplace, 1632, oil on wood. Philadelphia Museum of Art, Philadelphia, Pennsylvania, USA.

Willem Cornelisz Duyster (1599–1635) was a Dutch Golden Age painter from Amsterdam, best known for his "guardroom scenes" (cortegaarddje), genre paintings showing the military life.

== Biography ==
According to the Netherlands Institute for Art History, he was named after his house on the Amsterdam Koningstraat, which was called "De Duystere Werelt", the dim world. He knew his exact contemporary Pieter Codde well though, in a brawl between them in 1625, Codde hit him in the face with a "tin pitcher" at a country house party hosted by another artist. He married the sister of the painter Simon Kick (1603–1652), who in turn married Willem's sister.

== Painting career ==
After an early period as a portraitist, Duyster became a specialist in genre scenes such as merry company paintings, and military scenes. Unlike many painters of guardroom scenes, he avoided depicting prostitutes, with the women in his military paintings often hostages for ransom or the victims of looting or worse. He exhibited a strong ability to paint textiles, accurately characterize his subjects, and to depict relationships between his figures. Duyster's career was cut short when he succumbed to the plague in 1635.
