= Staffage =

Minor human and animal figures in a painting

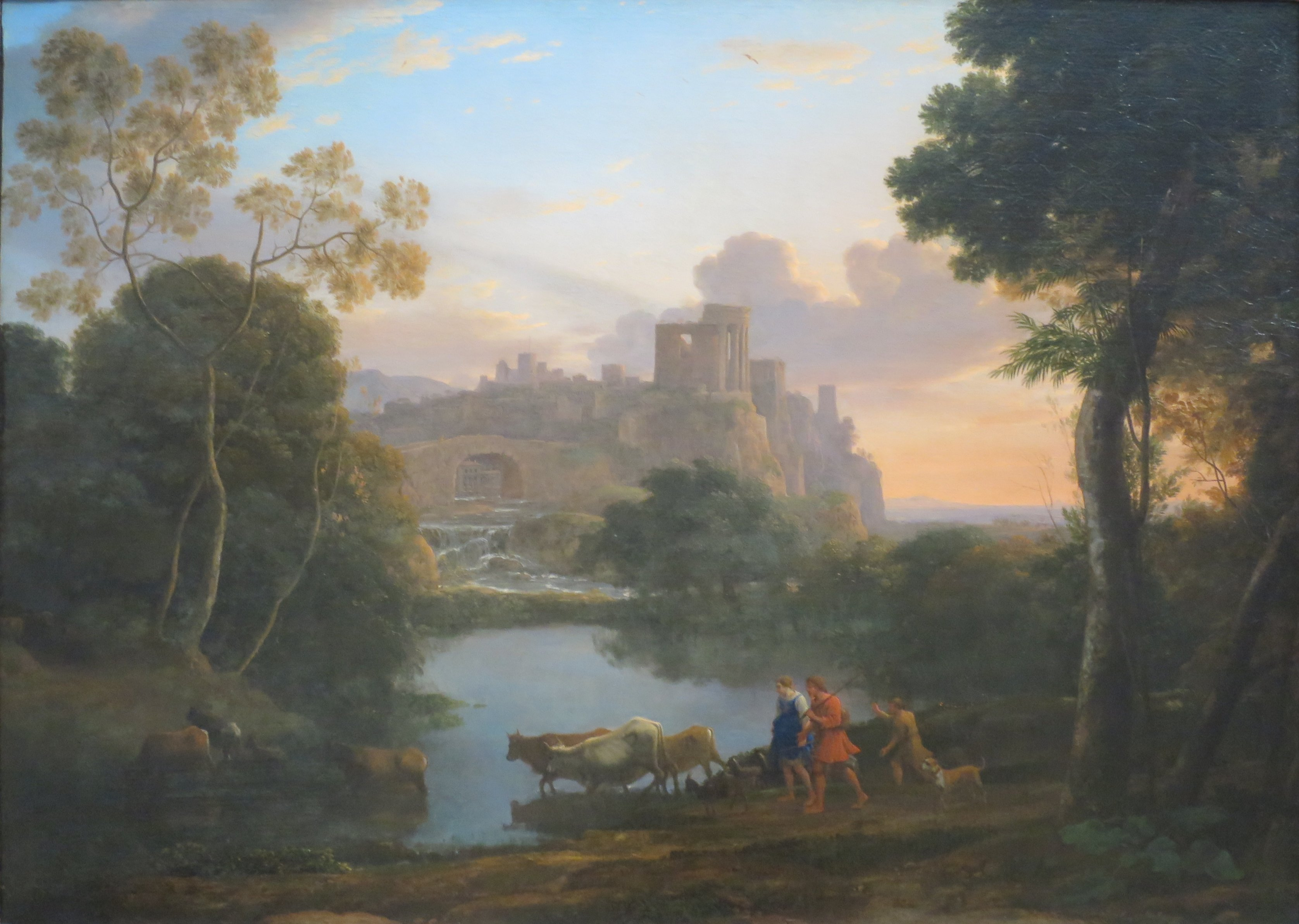
View of Tivoli at Sunset, 1644, with cows and cowherds as staffage, by Claude Lorrain

In painting, staffage (French pronunciation: [stafaʒ]) are the minor human and animal figures depicted in a scene, especially a landscape, that are not the primary subject matter of the work. Typically they are small, and there to add an indication of scale and add interest.

Before the adoption of the word into the visual arts in the late eighteenth and early nineteenth centuries, Staffage in German could mean "accessories" or "decoration". The word can be used in two senses: as a general term for any figures in a work, even when they are, at least ostensibly, the main subject, and as a descriptive term for figures to whom no specific identity or story is attached, included merely for compositional or decorative reasons. In the latter sense, staffage are accessories to the scene, yet add life to the work; they provide depth to the painting and reinforce the main subject, as well as giving a clear scale to the rest of the composition.

During the Baroque, painters such as Nicolas Poussin and Claude Lorrain commonly used staffage. Some landscape specialists had other painters who were more adept at painting the human form add staffage to their canvasses. Staffage figures in the second sense defined above are always unnamed and should be distinguished from equally small figures with an identity, who were also used in landscapes in what is technically a very similar way. However, when named figures are used, the contemporary theory of the hierarchy of genres holds that the landscape painting becomes a more prestigious history painting, even when the figures are small and inconspicuous amid a large landscape. Such works are often given modern titles in the form "Landscape with ...".

Staffage should also be distinguished from the figures in genre paintings, who are also anonymous and typically from the common people, but who are the main subject of the painting.

By the 19th century, books with patterns for hundreds of different staffage figures were published for painters to "cut and paste" into their compositions. Earlier artists had often kept drawings of such pattern figures, and the same figures often recur in several of the works of an artist, and can sometimes be traced passing to other artists.
