= Abraham van den Hecken the Younger =

Flemish-Dutch painter

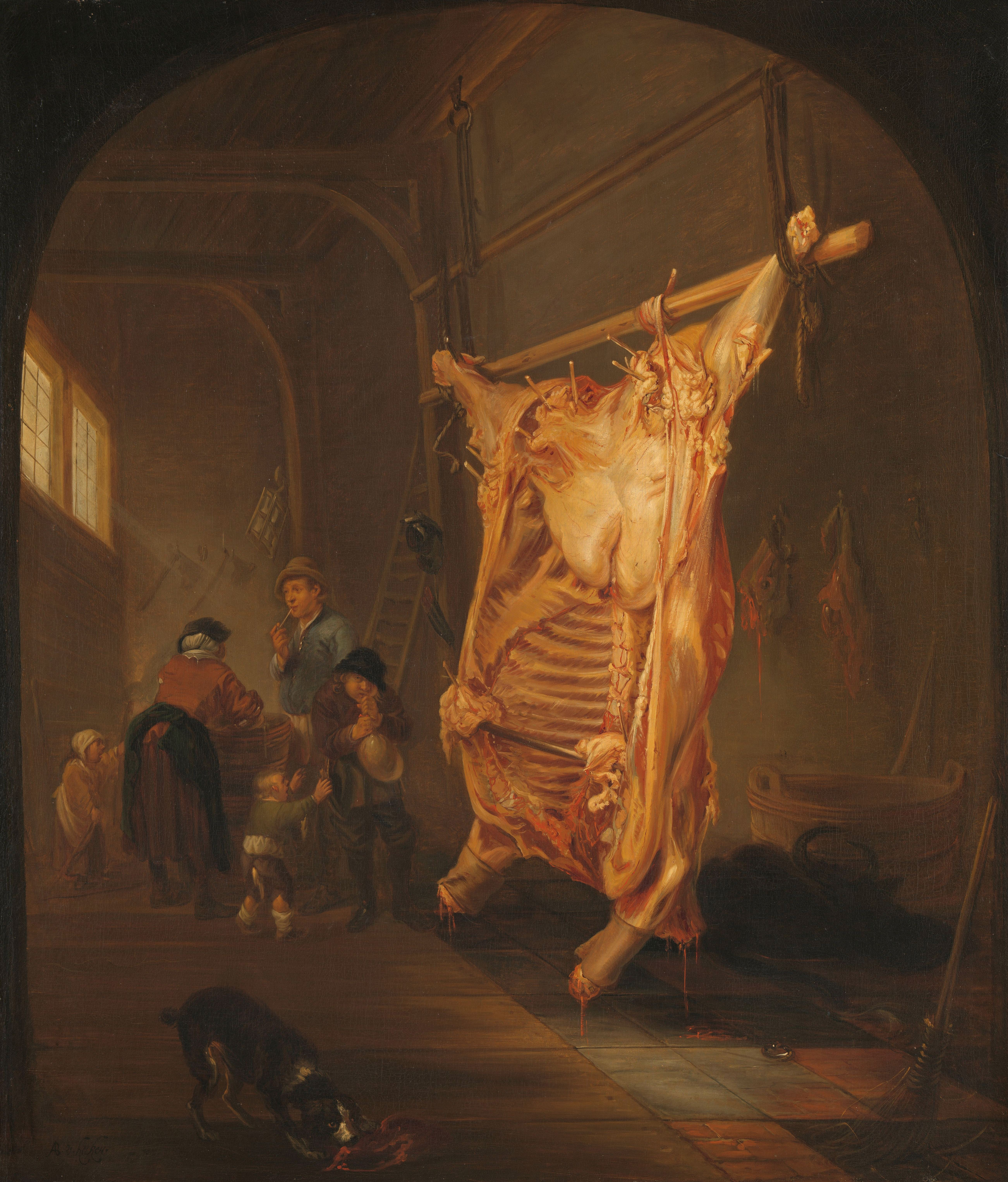
The slaughtered ox, Rijksmuseum

Abraham van den Hecken or Abraham van den Hecken the Younger (Antwerp, 1616 - between 1655 and 1669) was a Dutch-Flemish painter. He is known for his genre pieces, religious and historical scenes, portraits and still lifes.

== Life ==
Little is known about the life of Van den Hecken. Both his birth and death dates are uncertain. There is also some confusion with the life and work of another artist called Abraham van den Hecken the Elder who was a copperplate engraver, goldsmith and silversmith active in Frankenthal and Amsterdam. His relationship with this Abraham van den Hecken the Elder is not clear. Abraham van den Hecken the Elder was a member of a family of Flemish immigrants who moved from Antwerp to Frankenthal in Germany where they were active as goldsmiths. As Abraham van den Hecken the Elder collaborated on some prints with the printmaker and publisher Christoffel van Sichem the Elder and Christoffel van Sichem the Younger, the son of Christoffel van Sichem the Elder, was later the best man at Abraham van den Hecken the Younger's wedding, a family relationship seems likely.

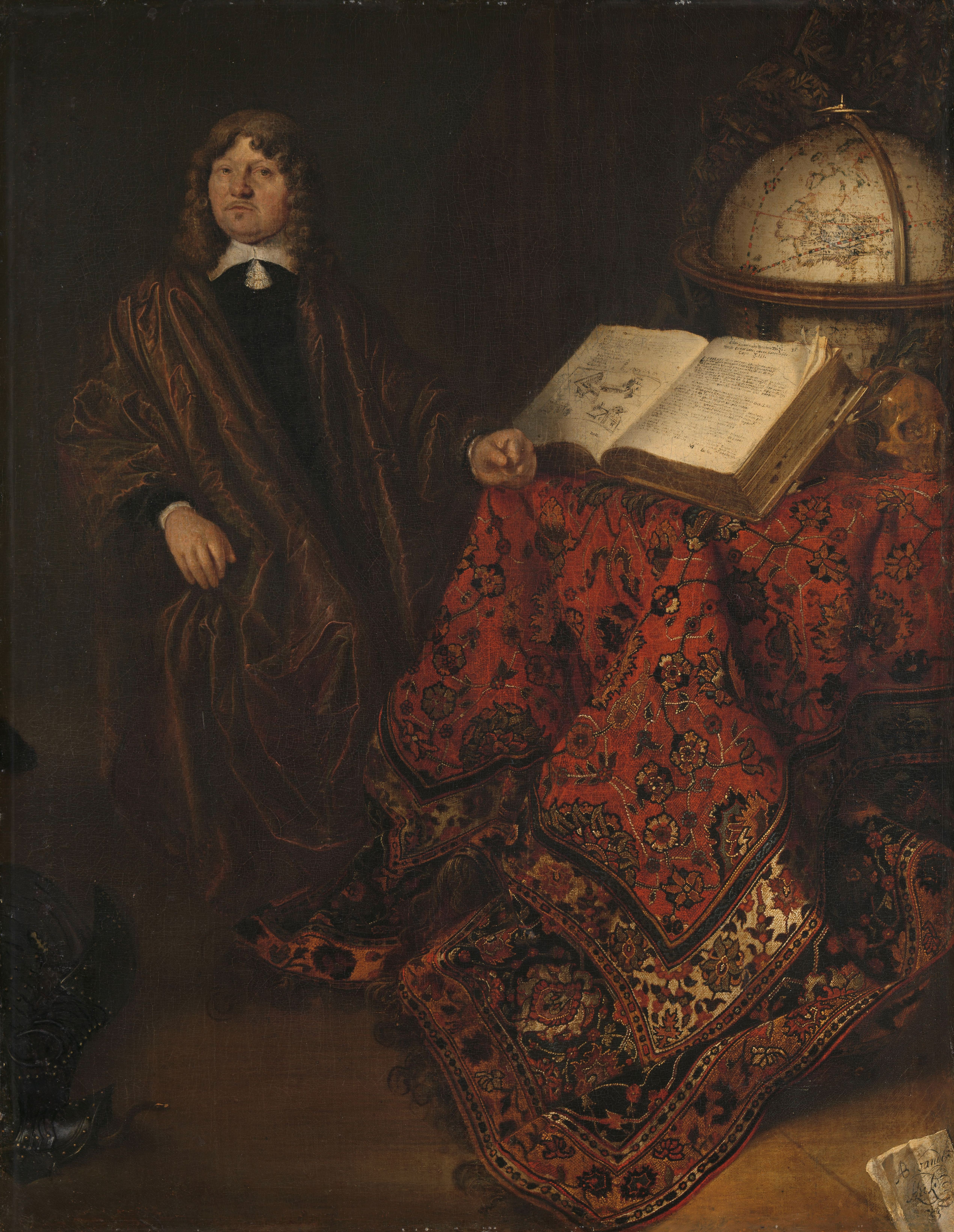
Portrait of the hydraulic engineer Cornelis Meijer

Abraham van den Hecken the Younger was born in Antwerp where he was baptized on 23 March 1616 as the son of Samuel van den Hecken and Sara Geijluwe. His father was a landscape and still life painter. His father moved in the 1620s to the Dutch Republic and was probably his first master. His sister Magdalena became a still life painter.

He posted banns of marriage on 7 July 1635 in Amsterdam for his marriage to Catharina Lundens, a sister of Gerrit Lundens. The couple got married on 29 July 1635 in Sloterdijk, with Christoffel van Sichem the Younger, an uncle of Lundens, acting as Abraham's best man. Gerrit Lundens was possibly a pupil of van den Hecken.

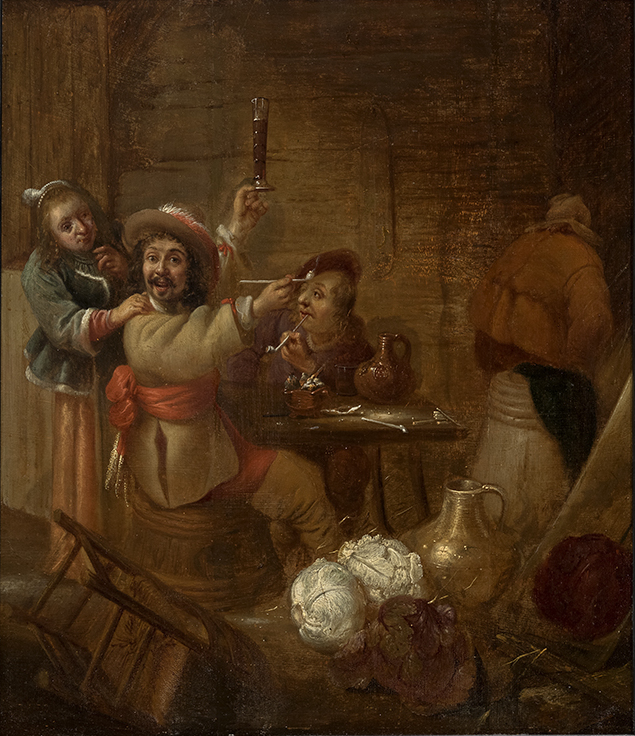
Tavern scene

From 1647 to 1649 van den Hecken was active in The Hague. He returned to Amsterdam in 1649. In 1652 he traveled to London where he was deacon of the Dutch Church.

He returned to The Hague in 1653. He died after 22 January 1655 and before 1669, when his wife was recorded as a widow. The place of death is believed to be Amsterdam or The Hague.

== Work ==
He painted genre scenes, history painting, portraits, Christian religious scenes, fruit still lifes and flower still lifes.
