= Abraham Govaerts =

Flemish painter

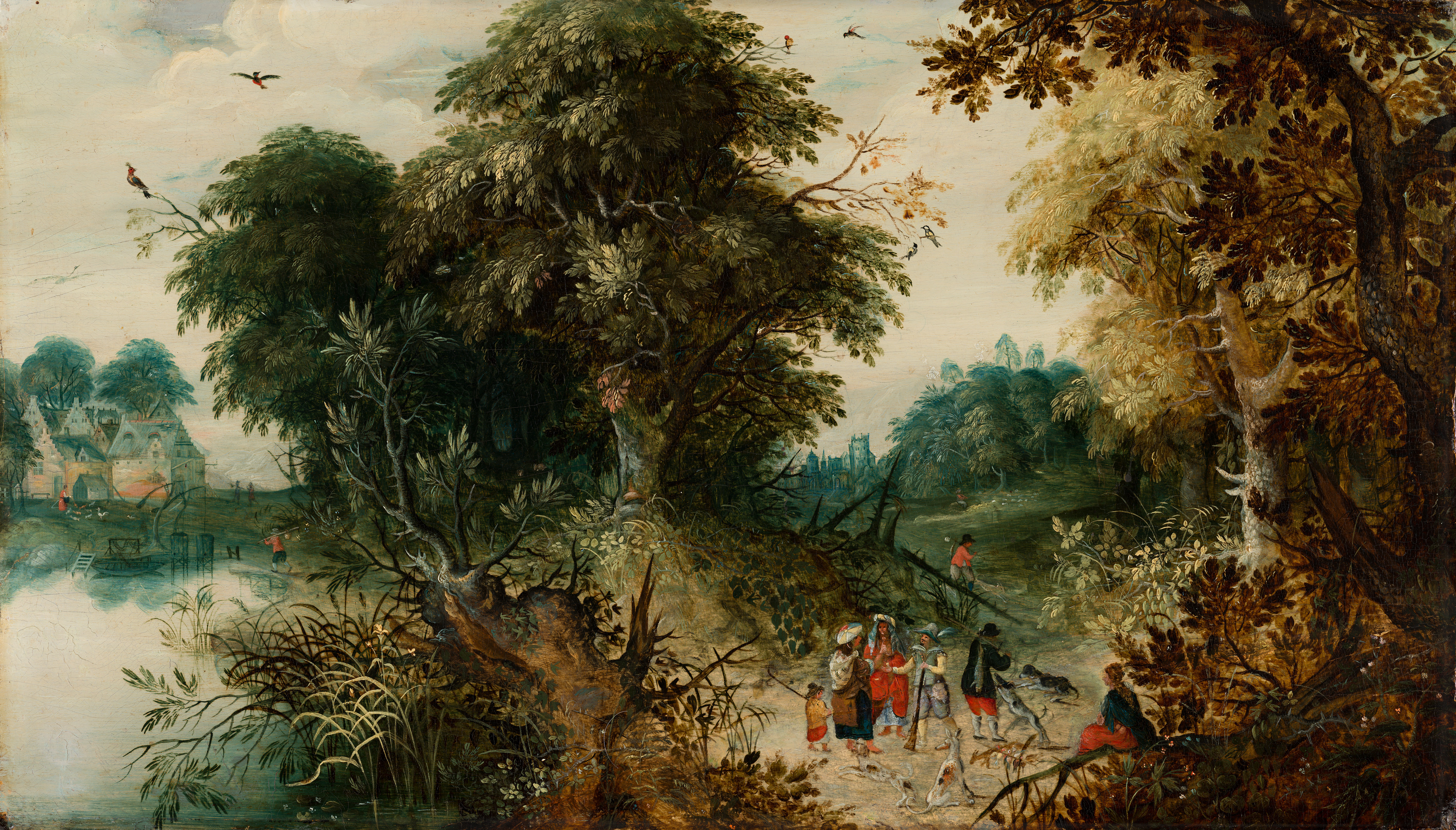
Wooded Landscape with Travellers

Abraham Govaerts (1589 – 9 September 1626) was a Flemish painter who specialized in small cabinet-sized forest landscapes in the manner of Jan Brueghel the Elder and Gillis van Coninxloo. He was a regular collaborator with other artists who were specialists in specific genres. Govaerts would paint the landscape while these specialists painted the figures, animals or still life elements.

== Life ==
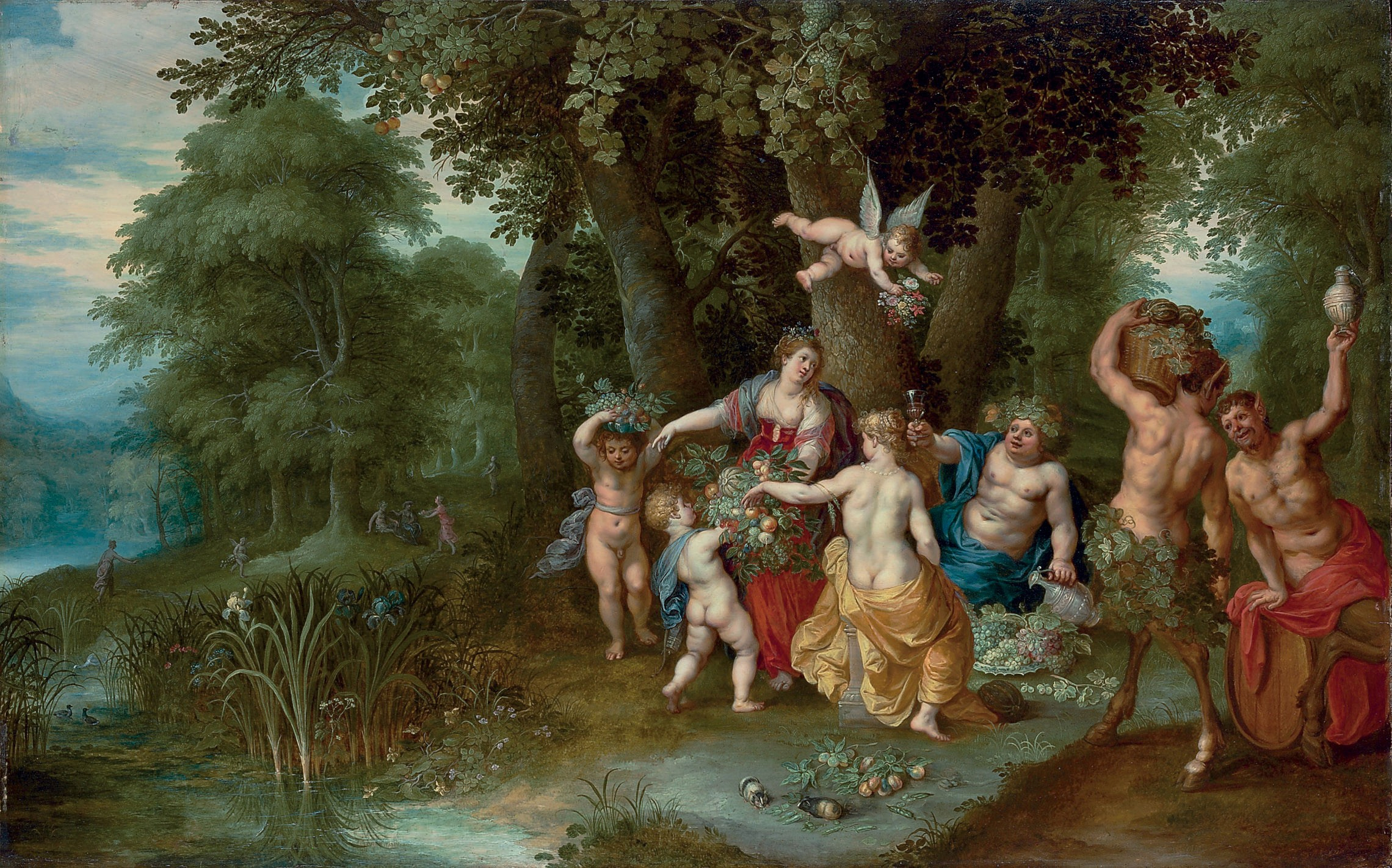
Bacchus, Venus and Ceres, an allegory of Autumn, collaboration with Hendrik van Balen

He was born in Antwerp where his father was an art dealer. There is no information on his training. In view of the influence on his early oeuvre of Jan Brueghel the Elder, some believe he may have apprenticed in the latter's workshop but there is no evidence for this. He became a master in Antwerp's Guild of Saint Luke in 1607–1608.

He married Isabella Gielis, with whom he had two daughters named Isabella and Suzanna. He was active throughout his career in Antwerp. He became deacon of the local Guild of Saint Luke in 1623.

He trained several artists including Alexander Keirincx, Nicolaes Aertsens and Gysbrecht van der Berch.

He was one of the many people who died during an epidemic in Antwerp. He died on 9 September 1626 and his wife followed him in death a few days later on 13 September 1626. After his premature death, his unfinished works were completed by a number of artists including Alexander Keirincx, Jasper van der Lanen, Jasper Adriaenssens, Nicolaes Aertsens, Antoon Bellieur, Peter Meulevelt and Jan Viers.

== Work ==
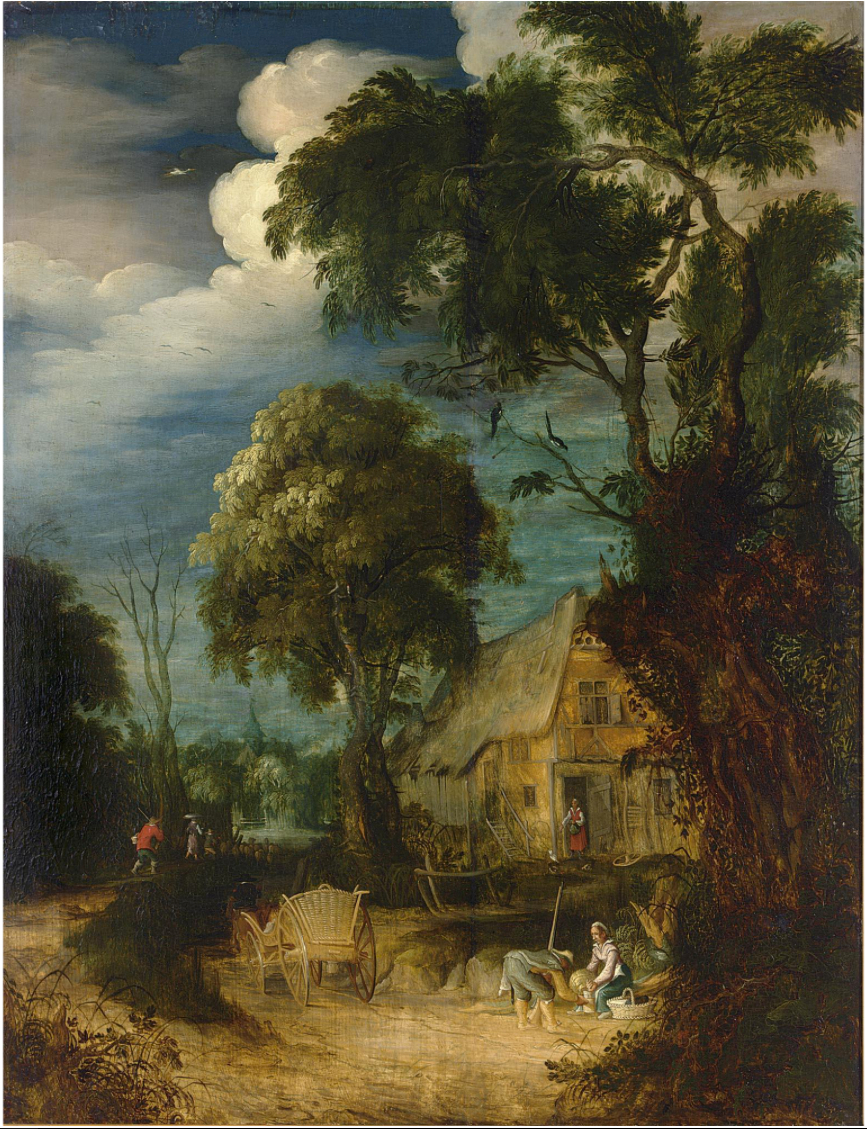
Wooded Landscape with Figures

Govaerts was a landscape specialist, and was known for his wooded landscapes which included a diminutive history, mythological or biblical subject or a hunting scene. His landscapes initially followed the Mannerist style of the three-colour world landscape in which the figures are bracketed by repoussoir trees. His palette at the time exaggerated the brown foreground and the blue tones in the foliage. An example is the composition Diana and Actaeon (Pushkin Museum, Moscow).

Another major influence was the landscape painter Gillis van Coninxloo. A painting entitled Landscape with River Vale and Falcon Hunt (Museum Mayer van den Bergh, Antwerp) is inspired by the work of Joos de Momper.

From 1620 onwards the Mannerist aspect of his palette was replaced by pure and brilliant colours applied in light stippling. He juxtaposed various colours to achieve gradual shading and gentle transitions. This style was more reminiscent of the work of Jan Breughel the Elder. He strived for a dynamic effect in his work by placing dramatic and contorted tree trunks in the foreground and using stark light–dark effects.

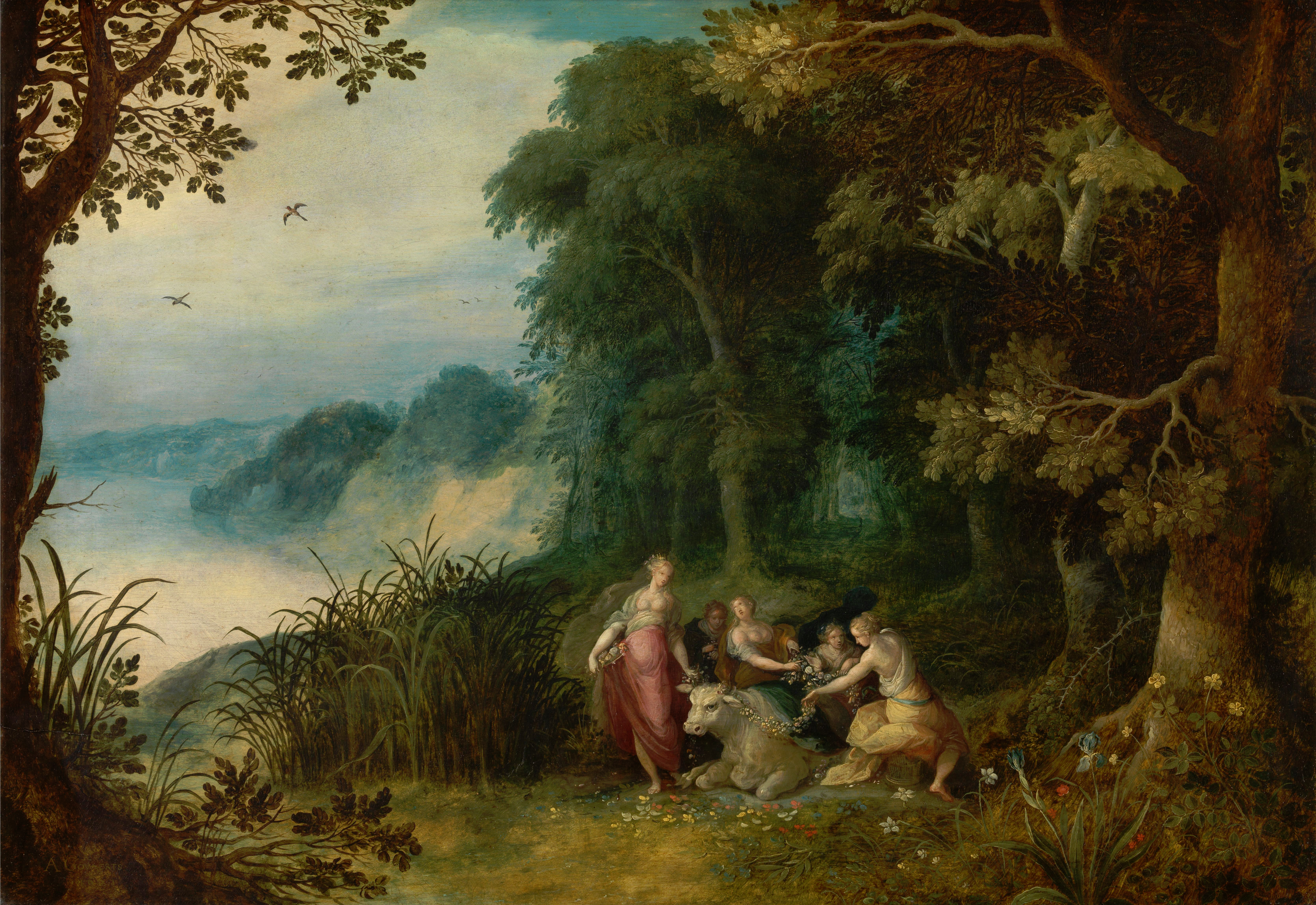
The Rape of Europa, collaboration with Frans Francken the Younger

As was common at the time, Govaerts often collaborated with other artists who were specialists in specific genres. Govaerts would take care of the landscape while these specialists painted the figures, animals or still life elements. He collaborated often with members of the Francken family such as Frans Francken the Younger and Ambrosius Francken I. Other collaborators included Sebastiaen Vrancx and Hendrick van Balen. An example of such a collaboration is the composition An elegant couple strolling through the forest where Govaerts had the assistance of Sebastiaen Vrancx who painted the figures and dog in the landscape. A landscape composition painted in collaboration with Frans Francken the Younger (Château de Compiègne) showing an open view of a river is uncharacteristic for his oeuvre.
