= Jasper van der Lanen =

Flemish landscape painter

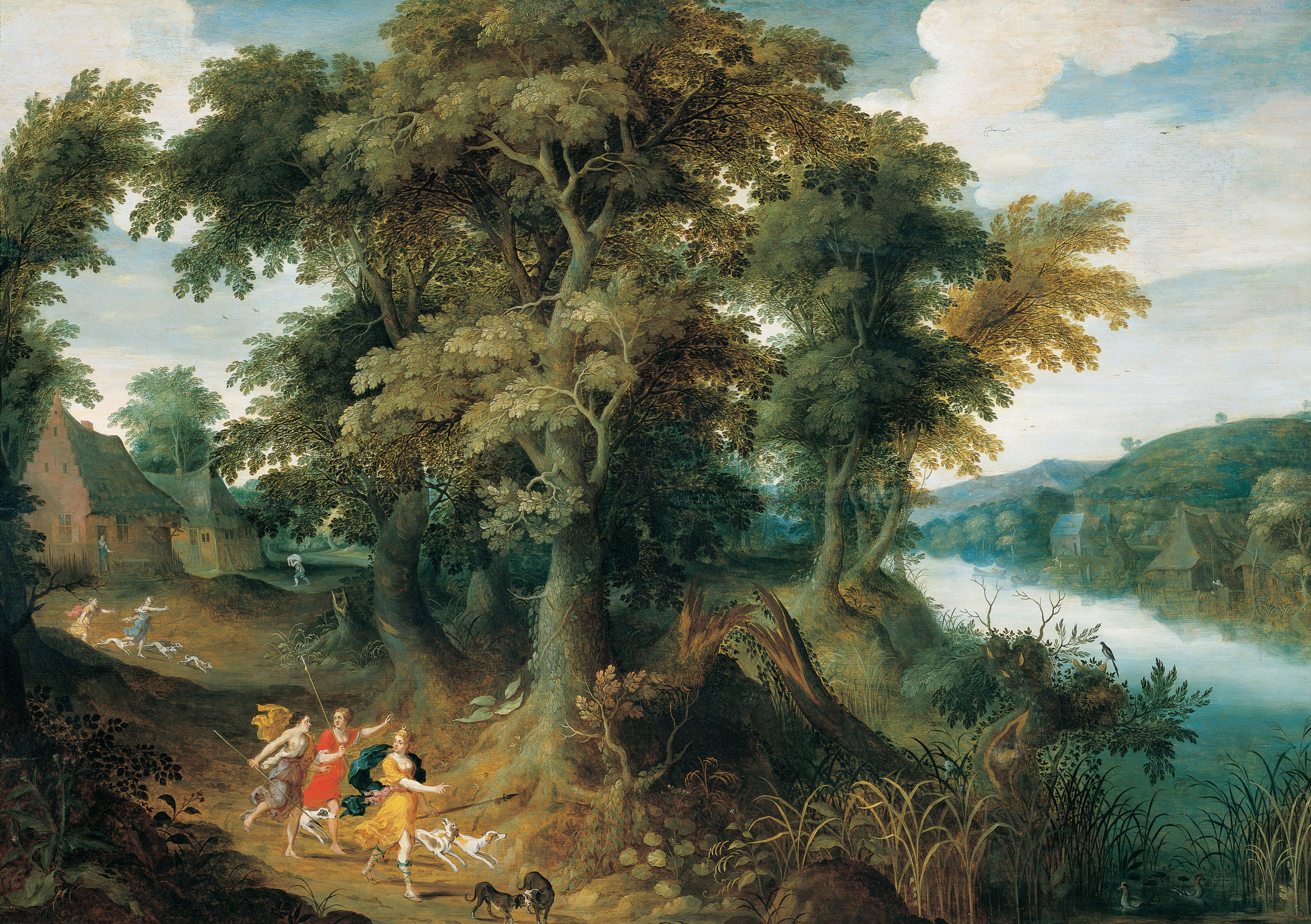
Diana and her nymphs on the hunt

Jasper van der Lanen, Jasper van der Laanen or Kasper van der Lanen (c. 1585 in Antwerp – after 1626 in Antwerp) was a Flemish landscape painter. He is known for his wooded landscapes with figures representing mythological or biblical stories or pastoral scenes. His work was only rediscovered in the mid-20th century. The discovery of additional signed works has made it possible to better understand the artist's style. As a result, there have been more attributions to him of works, which had previously been attributed to other painters with which he shared a similar approach to landscape painting such as Jan Brueghel the Younger.

== Life ==
Very little is known about the life of Jasper van der Lanen. He was registered as a pupil of the obscure painter Nicolaas Geerts in the guild year 1607 and became master of the Antwerp Guild of St. Luke in the guild year 1615.

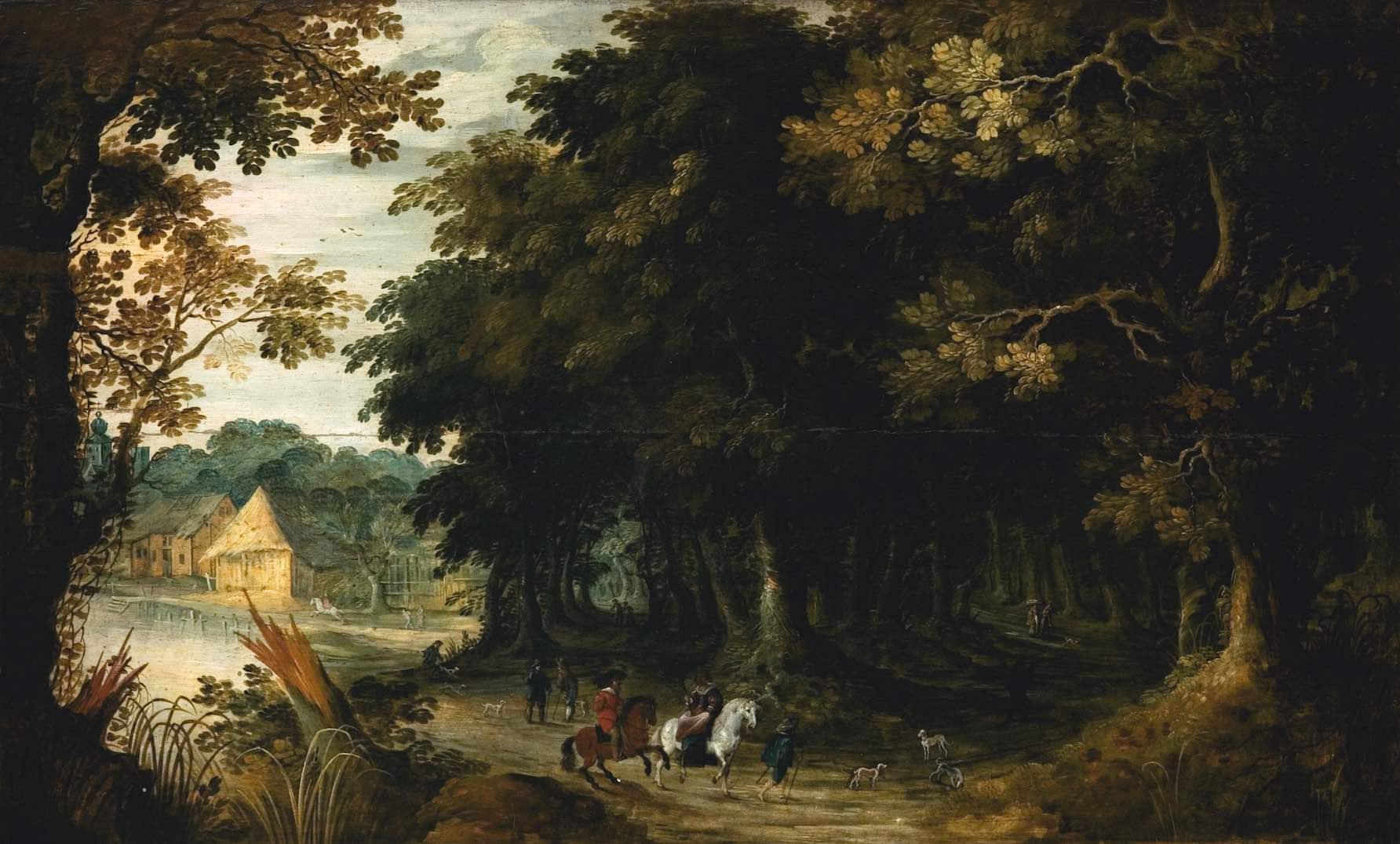
Landscape with travellers in a forest

In 1624 he married Elisabeth Rombouts. Abraham Govaerts acted as one of the witnesses at the wedding. Like van der Lanen, Abraham Govaerts was a young landscape painter and the two men were close friends. After the premature death of Abraham Govaerts on 9 September 1626, van der Lanen was one of the artists who were tasked with completing the works left unfinished by Govaerts. The other artists were Alexander Keirincx, Jasper (or Kasper) Adriaenssens, Nicolaes Aertsens, Antoon Bellieur, Peter Meulevelt and Jan Viers.

The time of death of van der Lanen is not known with certainty but it is believed he died in Antwerp sometime between 1626 and 1644.

== Works ==
Jasper van der Lanen was a specialist landscape painter. He is known for his wooded landscapes with figures representing mythological or biblical stories or pastoral scenes. His work was only rediscovered in the mid-20th century. The discovery of additional signed works has made it possible to better understand the artist's style. As a result, there have been more attributions to him of works, which had previously been attributed to other painters with which he shared a similar approach to landscape painting such as Jan Brueghel the Younger.

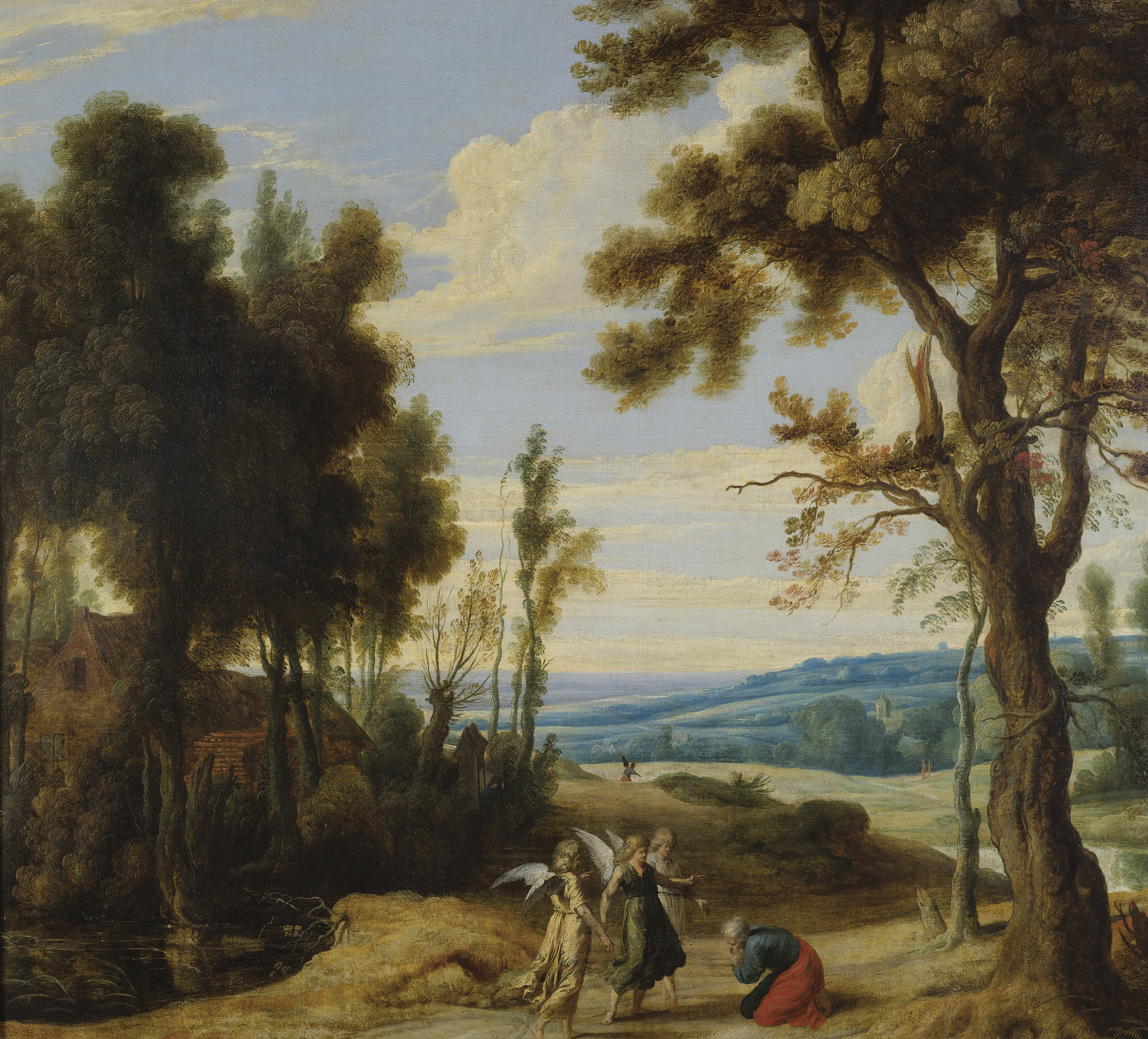
Three angels appearing to Abraham

Jasper van der Lanen was working in a style that was similar to that of the contemporary Antwerp landscape artist Abraham Govaerts, with whom he was friends. His paintings share motifs and composition patterns with Govaerts work. Govaerts continued and developed further on the 16th-century landscape formula that divided space into receding planes, distinguished by color: earth tones and ochres for the first plane, various tones of green for the middle ground and blue tones for the last, distant plane. They further used devices to allow the viewer to penetrate the landscape from the foreground into the distance, thus created a dynamic landscape composition.

Van der Lanen distinguished himself from Govaerts by reserving more space for the figures in the foreground, treating the props of his landscapes, such as the trunks of trees or clusters of yellowing with more detail, and painting reflections on the water and leaves with distinctly outlined edges. Typical hallmarks of van der Lanen's style are the clear diagonal perforations and the frequent use of broken tree trunks in the foreground.

As was common in Antwerp artistic practice of the time, van der Lanen collaborated with specialist figure painters who added the figures to his landscapes. The painter Frans Francken the Younger often added the staffage in his works as did Hans III Jordaens. In some cases more than two artists worked on the same composition as in the case of The Four Elements, in which van der Lanen painted the landscape, Frans Francken the Younger added some figures and Jan Brueghel the Younger filled in the animals, the flowers and the plants on the right as well as the figures in the middle distance.
