= Paulus van Hillegaert (I) =

Dutch Golden Age painter

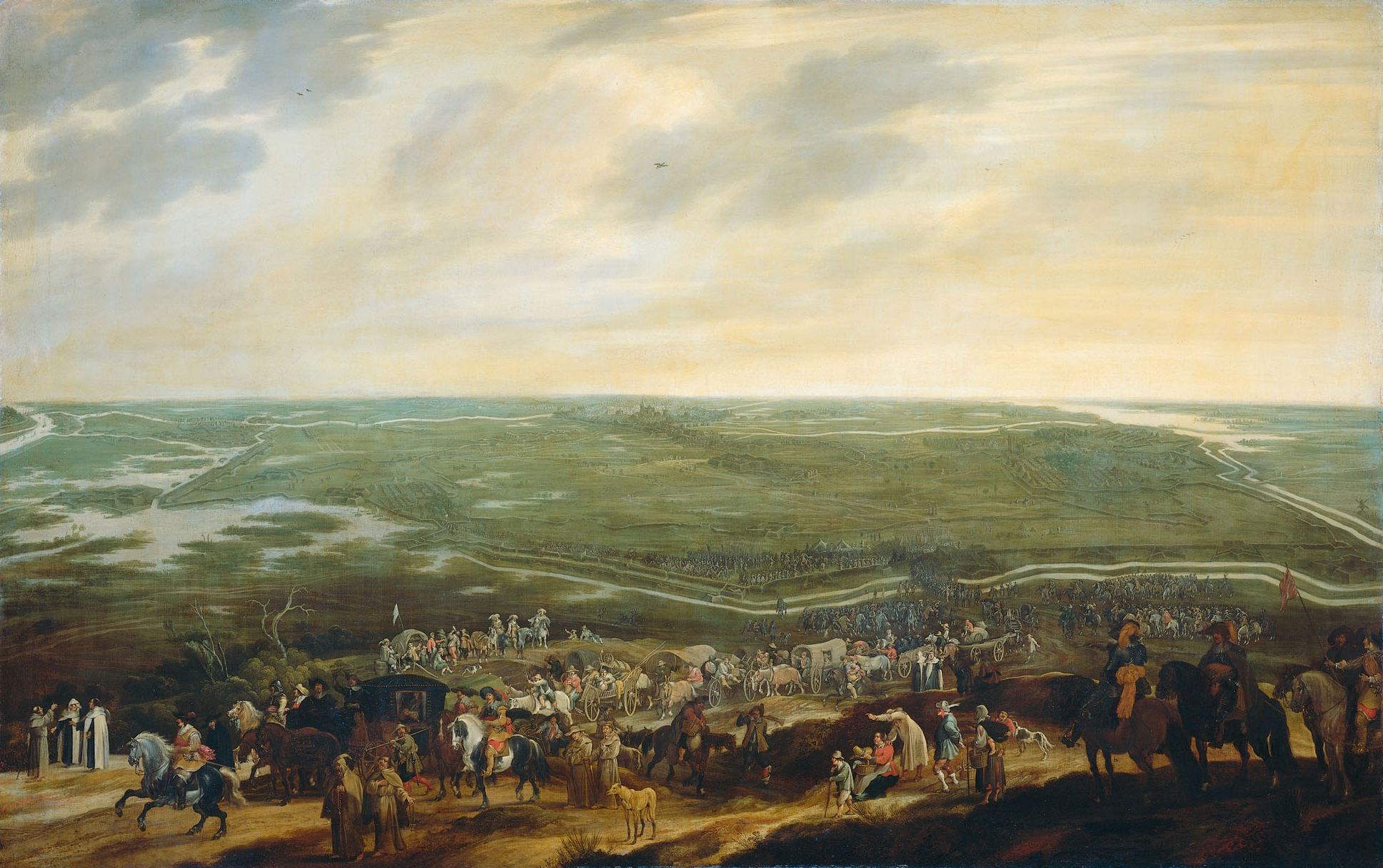
- Retreat of the Spanish troops after the Siege of 's-Hertogenbosch of 1629
- Born: 1596; Amsterdam
- Died: 1640 (aged 43–44); Amsterdam
- Known for: Baroque painting and drawing

Paulus van Hillegaert (I) or Pauwels van Hillegaert (I) (1596–1640) was a Dutch painter and draughtsman, known mainly for his landscapes, military scenes and equestrian portraits. He may also have painted the staffage in the landscape paintings of the Flemish painter Alexander Keirincx who worked for some time in Amsterdam. His work is closely related to that of the Dutch painter Henri Ambrosius Pacx.

== Life ==
Van Hillegaert was baptized 29 July 1596 in Amsterdam. His parents were Flemish immigrants Francois van Hillegaert (from Leuven and Janneke Spierinx (from Antwerp). It is not known with whom he trained.

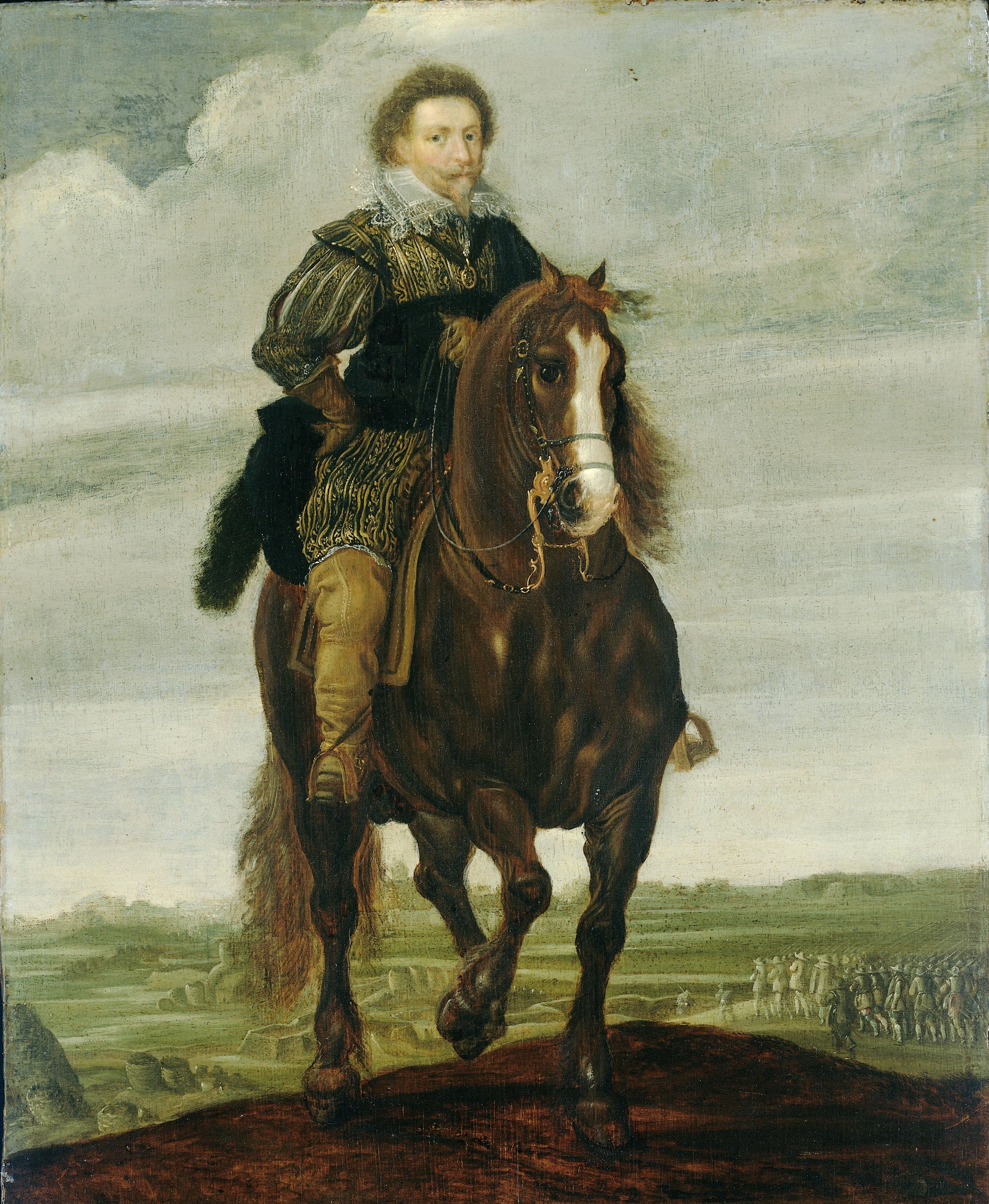
Portrait of Frederick Henry, Prince of Orange

He married Anneken Homis (Anna Hoomis) from Antwerp in 1620 (marriage license of 27 June 1620). From this marital union several children were born, including the painters Francois van Hillegaert (I) (1621–1660) and Paulus van Hillegaert (II) (1632–1658). Paulus (II) married Cornelia de Vlieger, the daughter of the painter Simon de Vlieger, and had two daughters. Through this marriage Paulus (II) became the brother-in-law of Gerrit Lundens. When Paulus (II) died in 1658 at a relatively young age, the Flemish artist biographer and poet Cornelis de Bie wrote a commemorative poem about him. After their father’s death, his son Francois inherited "all his father's painting implements, likewise the drawings by the same together with all the unfinished paintings".

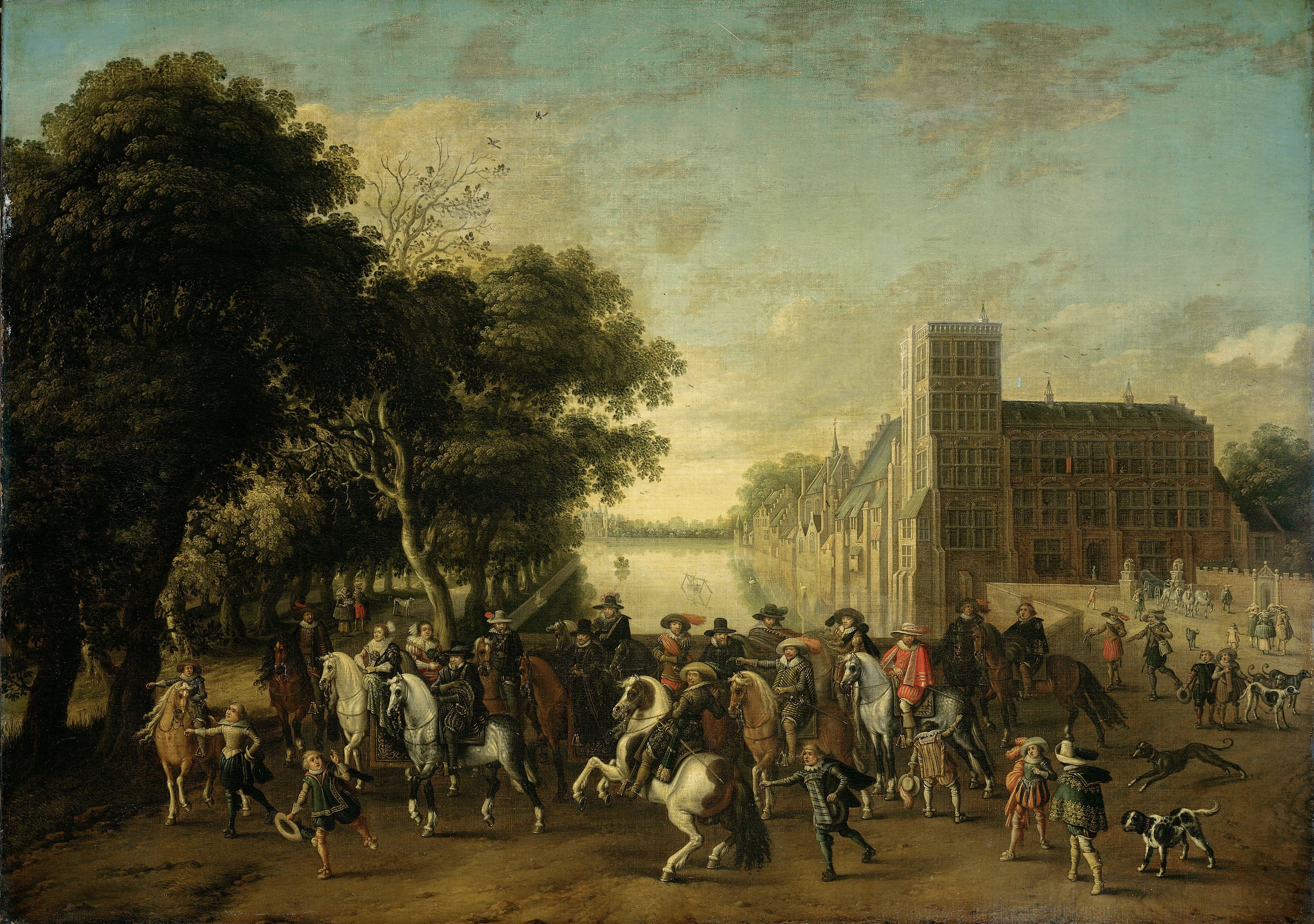
Prince Maurice in the company of Prince Frederick Henry, Frederick V and his wife Elizabeth Stuart, King and Queen of Bohemia and others at the Buitenhof in The Hague

He bought paintings at several auctions in 1625 or 1626. In 1639 he became a member of the civic guard (called in Dutch schutterij). Such civic guard was made up of volunteers who received military training in order to protect their town. He was included as such in the Portrait of the members of the civic guard company of Captain Dirck Tholinx and Lieutenant Pieter Adriaenszn Raep, a 1639 schutterstuk (militia piece or group portrait of members of the civic guard) by Nicolaes Eliasz Pickenoy (Amsterdam Museum). There is no longer any information to identify who in the group portrait is van Hillegaert or whether he was one of the sitters who was cut out of the picture when it was cut down after 1790.

He was buried in Amsterdam on 10 February 1640.

== Work ==
Van Hillegaert is known for his landscapes, military scenes and equestrian portraits. His earliest known work dates from 1619. He painted the important sieges of the Eighty Years' War led by the Princes of Orange Maurice and Frederick Henry. He depicted two of Prince Maurice's key military successes: the victory at the Battle of Nieuwpoort in 1600 and the disbanding of the ‘Waardgelders’ in Utrecht in 1618. He further painted the Siege of 's-Hertogenbosch of 1629, an important victory for Prince Frederick Henry. He also created equestrian portraits of the two Princes and other dignitaries.

His military scenes are closely related to those of the Dutch painter Henri Ambrosius Pacx and, to an extent, the Flemish painter Pieter Snayers.

He often executed multiple versions of paintings as he likely worked mainly for the open market and less often on commission for the House of Orange or official institutions. For instance, four known version of the Siege of 's-Hertogenbosch are known. He may have added the figures in a landscape by Alexander Keirincx.

A number of landscape drawings, some of Italianate landscapes, have been attributed to the artist.
