= Gerrit Lundens =

Dutch painter (1622–1686)

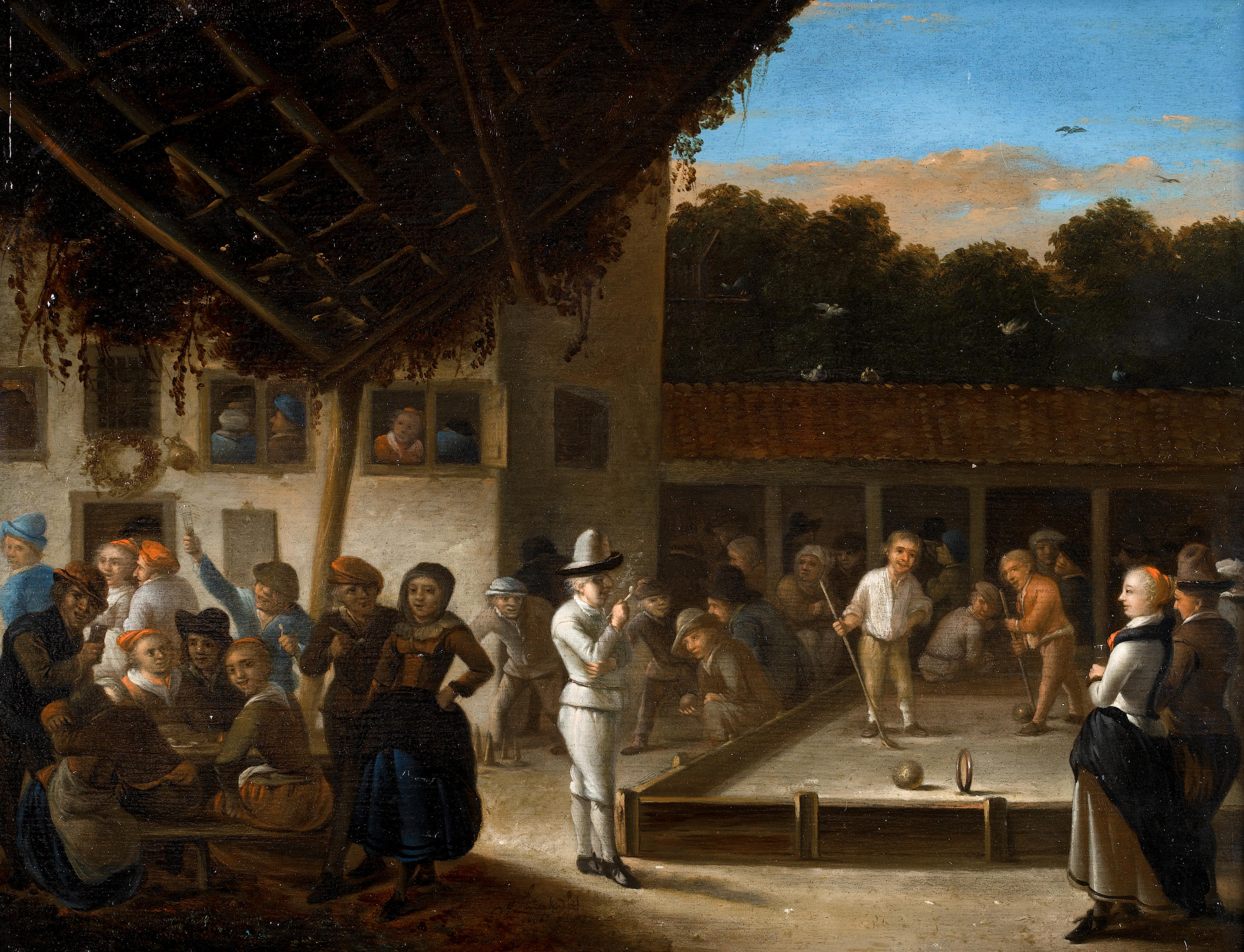
Croquet players in the courtyard of an inn

Gerrit Lundens (1622 – 1686), was a Dutch painter known for his genre scenes, portraits and a single vanitas painting. He also made copies after prominent masters, including Rembrandt. He further operated an inn and was active as a wine merchant.

== Life ==
He was born in Amsterdam as the son of Berend (or Barend) Lunden, a laundry bleacher, and Catharyne (or Catharina) van Sichem, daughter of the engraver Christoffel van Sichem the Elder. His father's family was originally from Antwerp and had moved to Middelburg and c. 1590 to Amsterdam. His aunt Anneke (or Annken) Lunden (born in Antwerp in 1571) married in 1620 Christoffel van Sichem the Younger, who was presumably her brother-in-law.

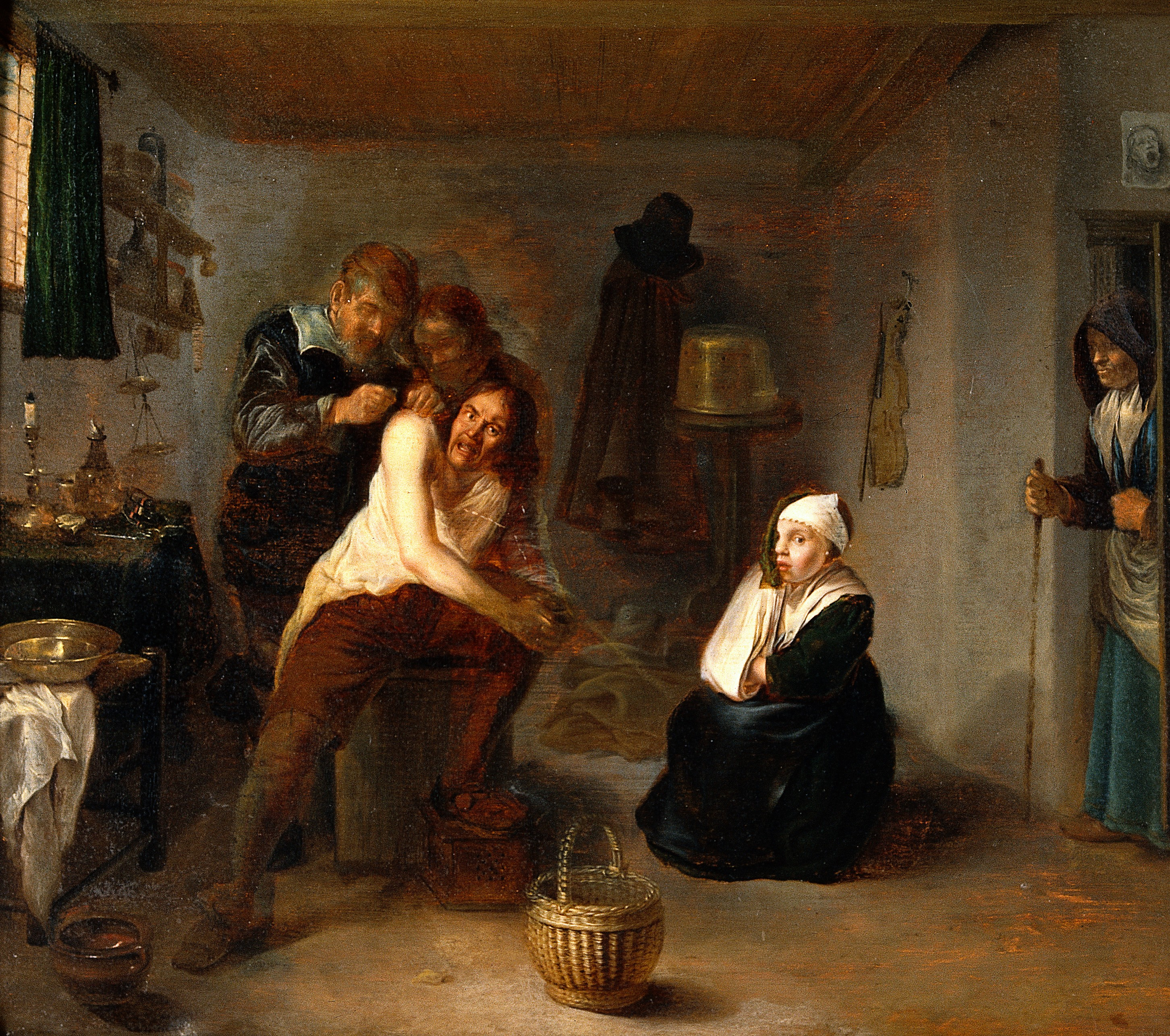
Interior with a surgeon operating on a man's back

He may have trained with the painter Abraham van den Hecken the Younger, his brother-in-law who had married his sister Catharina when he was 13 years old. The stylistic similarities of his early works with those of van den Hecken seem to confirm this apprenticeship. He was first recorded as a painter in 1643. He posted banns of marriage on 27 April 1643 with Agniet Mathijs (or Angeniet Mathijsen), a native of Antwerp. The couple married on 10 May 1643 in Sloterdijk, a village about 3 km northwest of the Amsterdam city centre. The couple had a number of children between 1646 and 1652. His daughter Anna married on 12 June 1677 in Amsterdam the ruby cutter Gillis Ouman. His daughter Ysabella posted banns on 13 November 1677 and married Theodorus van Rijn, a gemstone cutter. Through his marriage he was also a brother-in-law of the painter Paulus van Hillegaert (I).

In 1667 Lundens became a 'poorter' (citizen) of Amsterdam. In addition to his activity as a painter, he also earned a living as an innkeeper and wine merchant. His wine trading business went bankrupt in 1671 a year before France invaded the Dutch Republic. His last dated painting was made in 1675. He may have stopped painting due to the economic downturn caused by the French invasion.

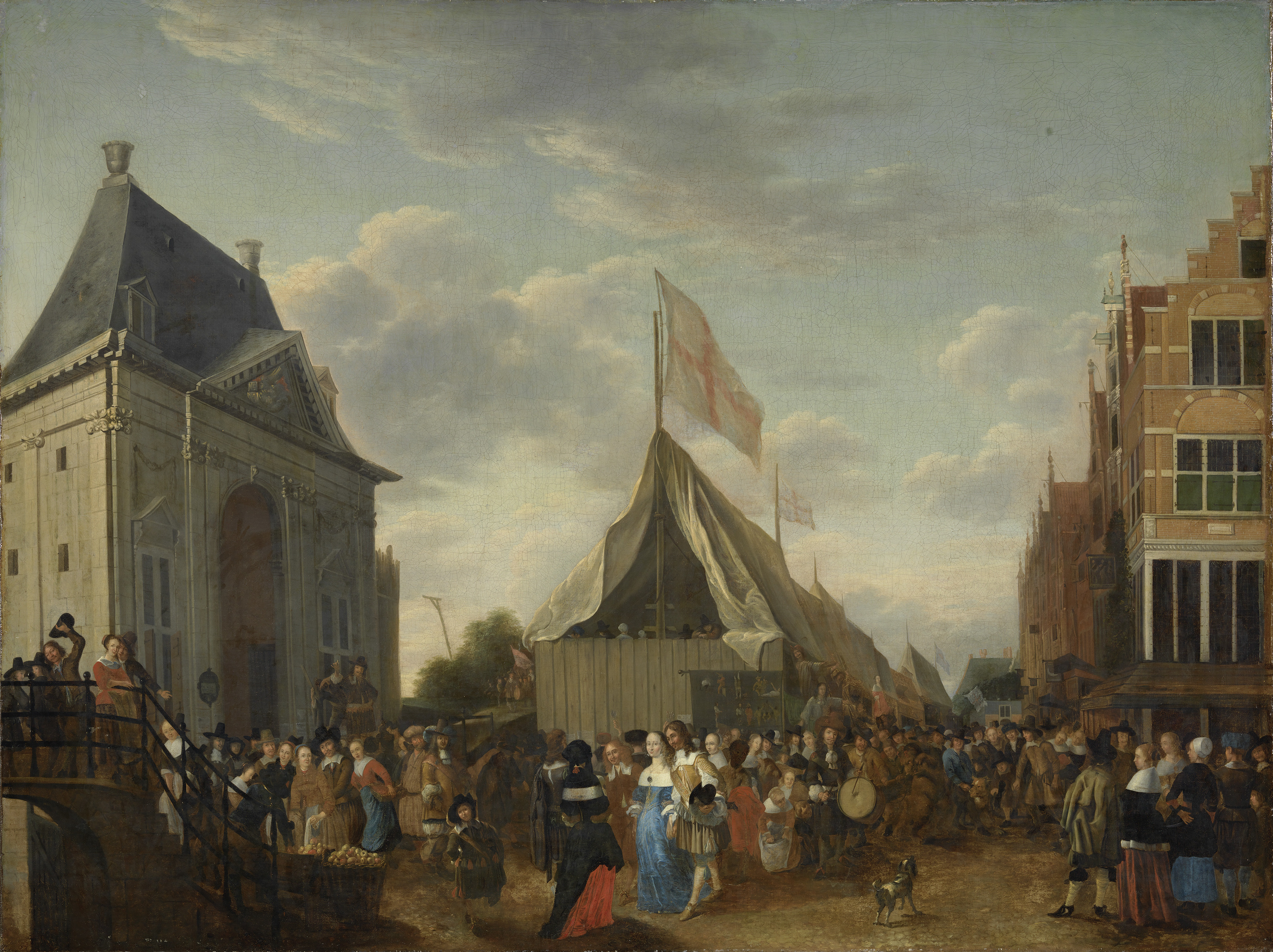
Fair at the Heiligwegpoort in Amsterdam

At the time of his death in 1686 he lived on the Singel near the Munt.

== Work ==
About 150 paintings and a few drawings have been attributed to Lundens. He is known for portraits, genre scenes, a vanitas still life and copies of old masters. He was influenced by his brother-in-law Abraham van den Hecken and Jan Miense Molenaer, a pupil of Frans Hals.

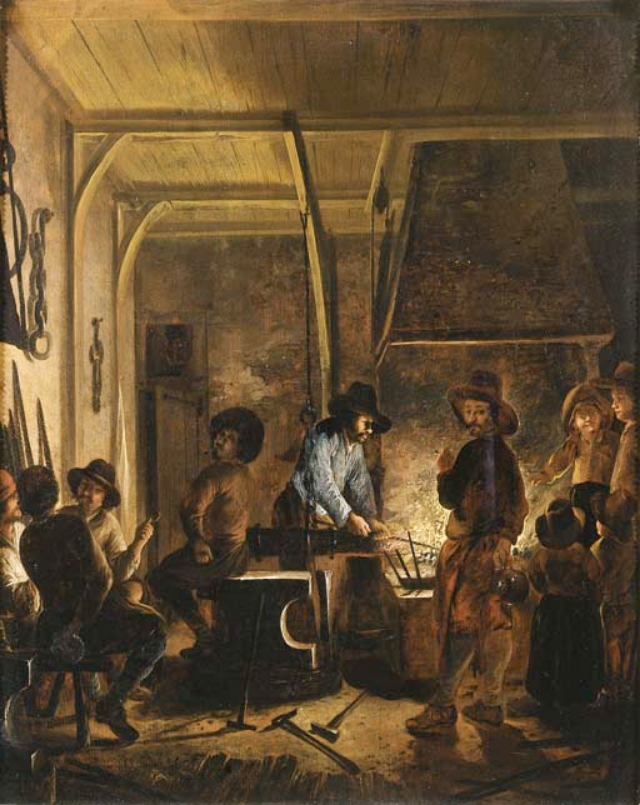
A blacksmith at work

His genre scenes often represent peasants and persons from the lower as well as middle classes enjoying a good time at taverns. He painted about a dozen wedding parties. He further painted more unusual subjects, such as scenes with surgeons performing operations and views of the fire that destroyed the old town hall of Amsterdam on 7 July 1652 (one version in the Amsterdam Museum). He painted a view of the Fair at the Heiligwegpoort in Amsterdam (at the Amsterdam Museum), which shows, amongst the festive fair, a fight of dogs (so-called 'berebijters' (bear biters') against a bear. Since Lundens did not vary the handling of his genre scenes substantially over time, it is difficult to date these works.

He painted family portraits, pendant portraits of couples and miniature portraits.

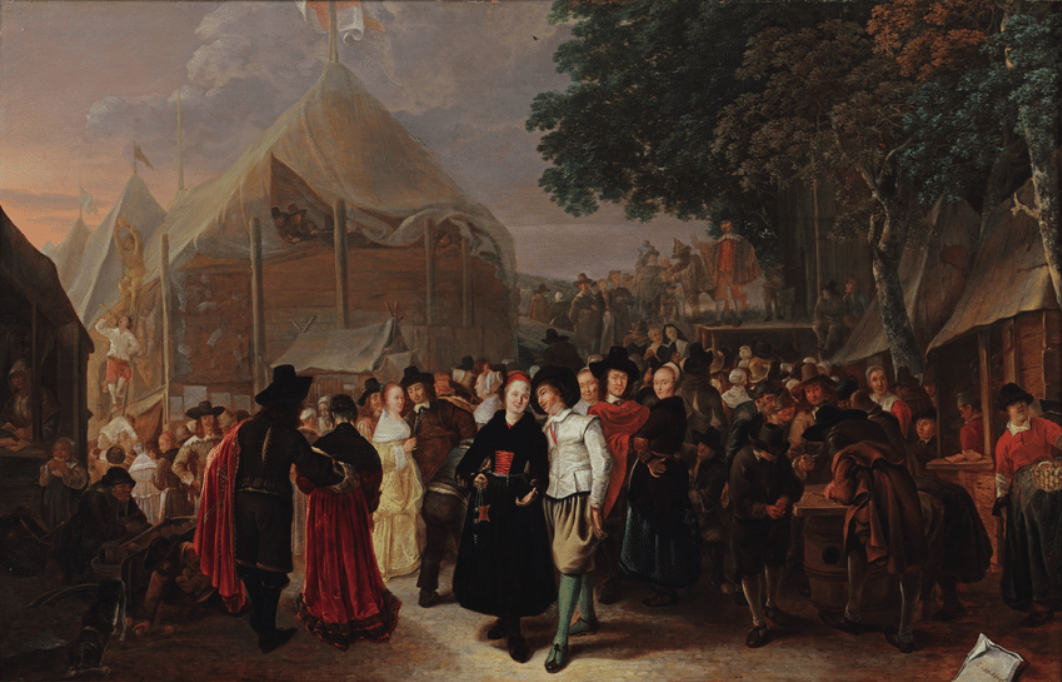
The fairgoers

He made copies after prominent masters including work of the Flemish genre painter Adriaen Brouwer who had worked a long time in the Dutch Republic. His most notable copy after a work of a contemporary master is his copy of The Night Watch, Rembrandt's famous painting which shows one of Amsterdam's Schutterijen (civic militia guards) led by its Captain Banning Cocq out of the gates of their Amsterdam militia headquarters (original on display at the Rijksmuseum Amsterdam. It is believed that Captain Cocq commissioned Lunden to make the smaller replica, which is now in the collection of the National Gallery, London. Lundens' copy painted only a few years after the original, shows Rembrandt's work before 1715 when it was cut down on three sides and lost a few figures. One significant difference with the original work is the more elevated position of the pikeman Walich Schellingwou, which was possibly to compensate for the omission of the cartouche with the names of the persons depicted. It has been suggested that about 10 of his works made around the time he is presumed to have copied The Night Watch were influenced by Rembrandt's composition. His composition The fairgoers (private collection, c. 1643-49) has even been described as plagiarism of The Night Watch in its organisation of the figures in a chaotic crowd to create the illusion of movement, the flanking of the central figures by dark sections and the various light effects used to highlight certain details.
