= Framing (visual arts) =

Presentation of visual elements in an image

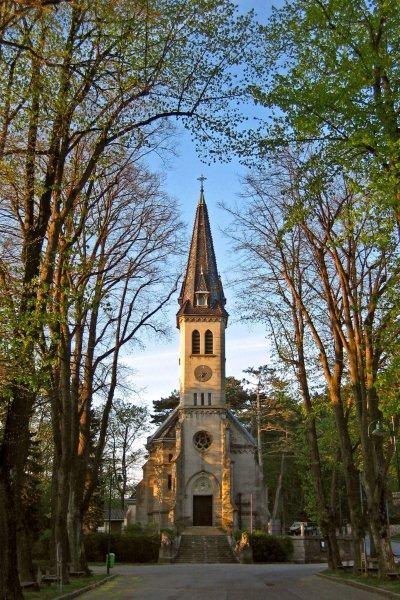
Framing: trees focus on the church of Weissenbach an der Triesting, Austria

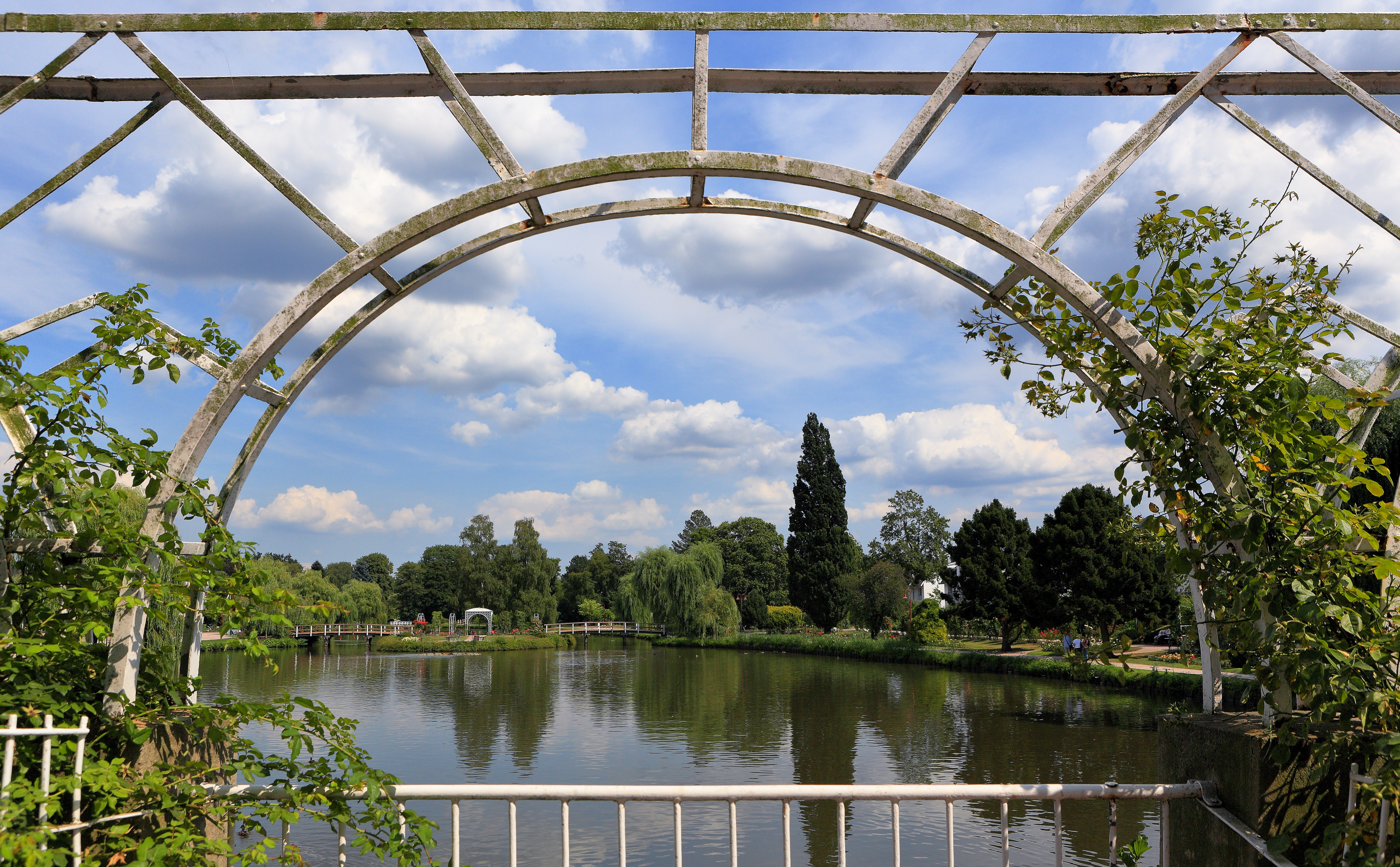
A framing view of the Uetersen Rosarium.

In visual arts and particularly cinematography, framing is the presentation of visual elements in an image, especially the placement of the subject in relation to other objects. Framing can make an image more aesthetically pleasing and keep the viewer's focus on the framed object(s). It can also be used as a repoussoir, to direct attention back into the scene. It can add depth to an image, and can add interest to the picture when the frame is thematically related to the object being framed.

== Purpose ==
The goal is often to focus the viewer's attention on the subject, but the ends and means are ultimately at the discretion of the artist. It is accomplished by manipulating the viewpoint of the image, rather than the object(s) within.

Framing, especially in the photographic arts, is primarily concerned with the position and perspective of the viewer. The position of the observer has tremendous impact on their perception of the main subject, both in terms of aesthetics and in their interpretation of its meaning.

For example, if the viewer was placed very far away from a lone subject in an image, the viewer will gather more information about the subjects' surroundings and bearing, but very little in terms of emotions. If the setting was in the middle of a flat plain, the viewer might perceive a sense of loneliness or that the subject is lost, because the viewer cannot find any visual cues to orient the location of the subject. If some foreground elements are put in front of the viewer, partially obscuring the subject, the viewer would take the position of an unseen observer. Especially if the artist chooses to hint at some malicious intent, a member of the audience might feel uncomfortable looking through the eyes of, say, a stalker.

== Factors determining frame ==
- Repoussoir – Foreground elements placed along the sides of the frame to lead the viewer's eye onto the subject. Can be used to create a more closed and stable space in the frame.
- Depth of field (DoF) – The distance between the nearest and furthest points in which an object will be in focus. A longer distance means the DoF is deeper, and a shorter distance means the DoF is shallower. This selective focus technique allows the artist to directly control which areas of the frame the viewer should be focused on.
- White space – Negative space used in framing to increase aesthetic appeal. This principle of design allows a balance in the frame to positive space. The empty area can form contrasting silhouettes with the subject and thus become a meaningful aspect of the frame; however, negative space is used mostly as a neutral or complementary background in order to draw focus upon the central subject.
- Vignetting – A naturally occurring optical phenomenon where the brightness or saturation is reduced at the periphery of an image. Can be produced mechanically or digitally to bring focus to the well-lit and saturated areas of the image, known as the "hotspot" effect.
- Perspective distortion – An optical technique where lenses of different focal lengths are used to affect the perceived distance between the foreground and background. Wider lenses extend the distance and show more of the background, which can be used to reveal a detailed view of the subject and its immediate surroundings in the same frame. Longer lenses compress the distance; because it can minimize the perception of space within the frame, it can be used on buildings and cars to create a scene of congestion.
- Color and lighting.
