= Alexander Keirincx =

Flemish painter

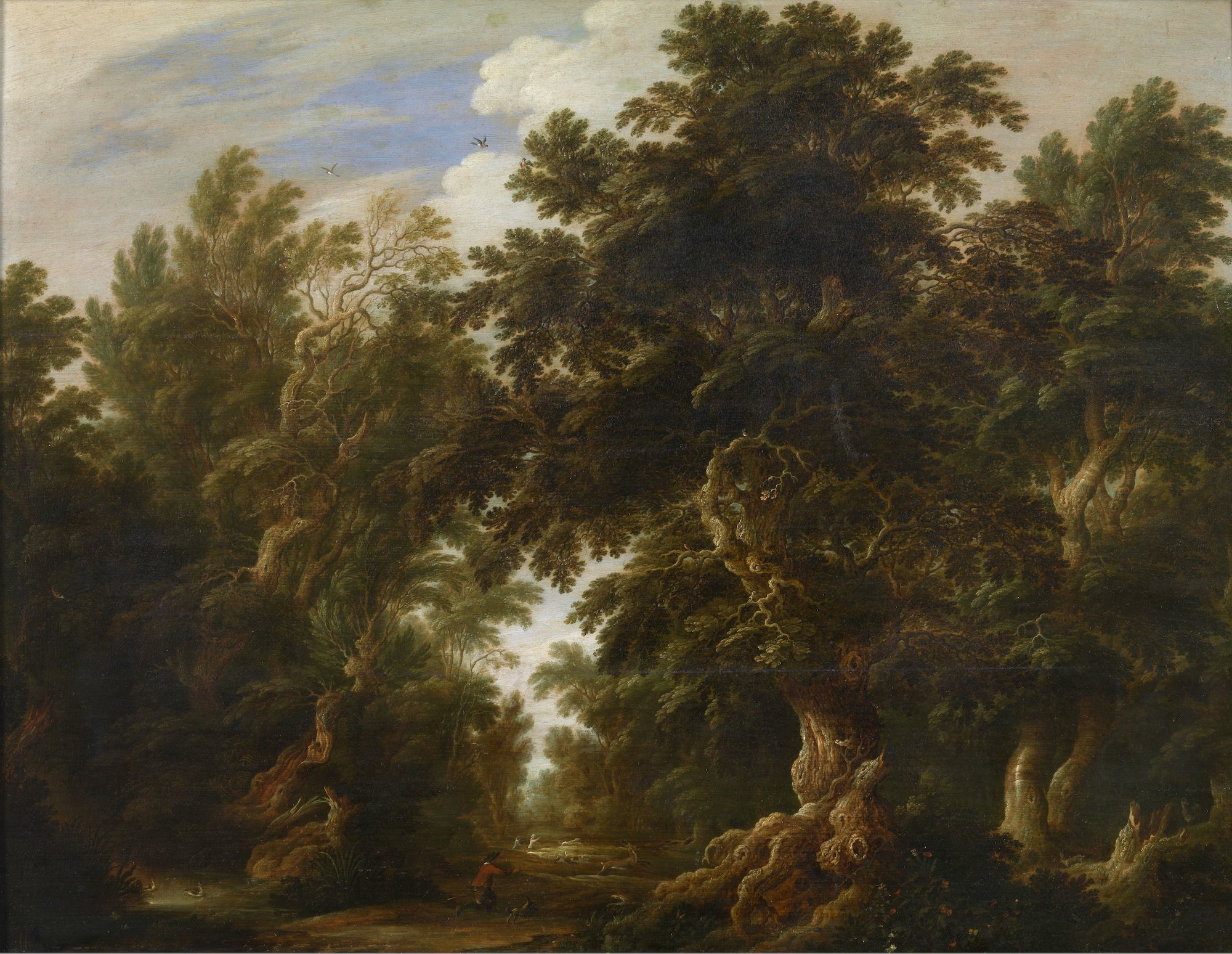
Landscape with a deer hunt

Alexander Keirincx (23 January 1600 in Antwerp – 1652 in Amsterdam) was a Flemish landscape painter who is known for his wooded landscapes with figures as well as his 'portraits' of English castles and country houses. After training in his native Antwerp, he worked abroad and in particular in the Dutch Republic and England. During his residence in England, he worked on royal commissions for landscape paintings depicting views of the king's castles and houses in Northern England and Scotland. He was a regular collaborator of the Dutch painter Cornelis van Poelenburch.

== Life ==
Alexander Keirincx was born in Antwerp on 23 January 1600 as the son of Matthijs Keirincx and Anna Mason. He became a master in the Antwerp guild of St. Luke in the guild year 1618–1619. While it is not recorded who his master was, it has been suggested that it was the leading Antwerp landscape painter Abraham Govaerts.

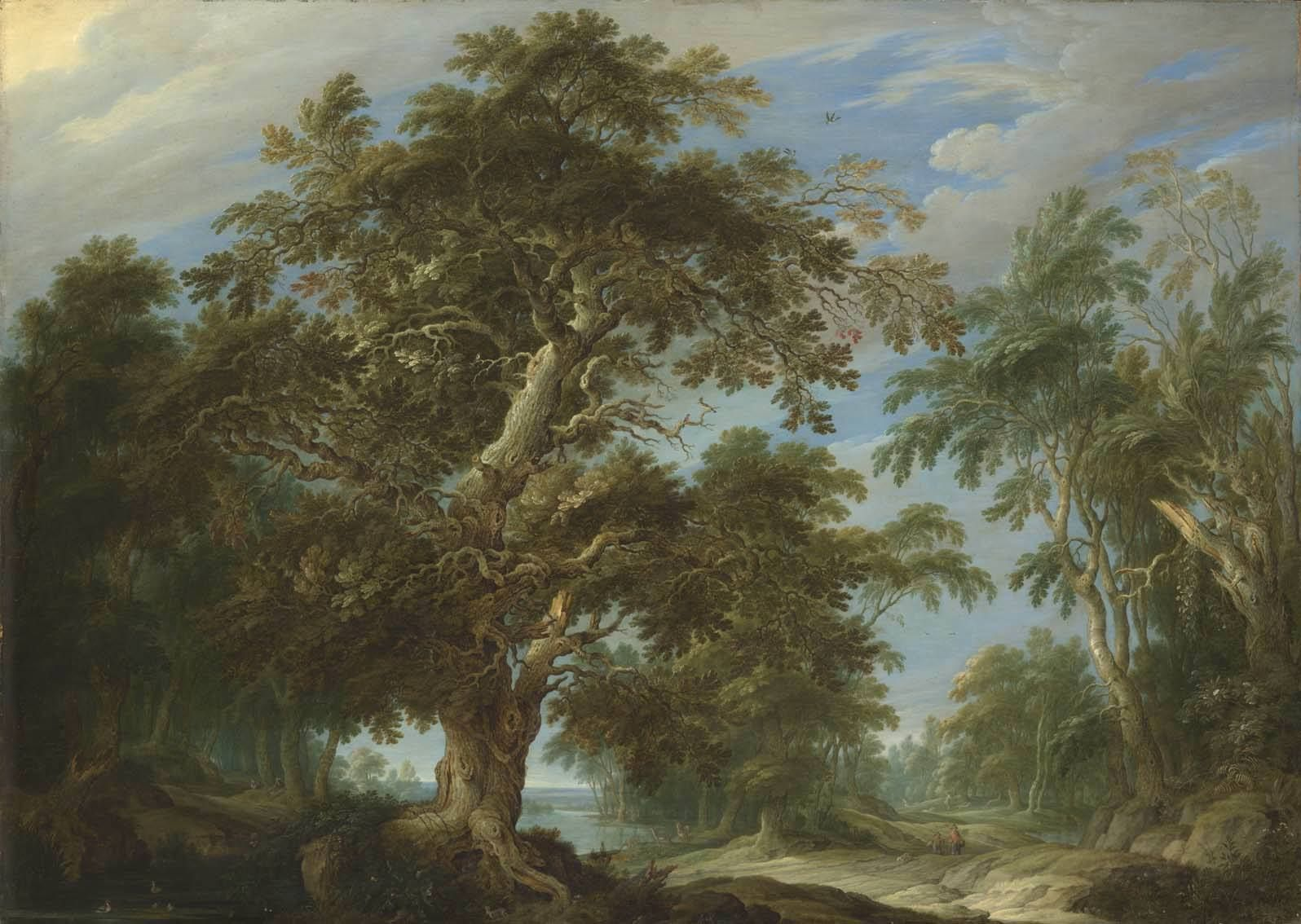
Forest landscape with hunters

He married Clara Mattheusen on 18 June 1622 in Antwerp. In the guild year 1623–1624, Artus Verhoeven was registered as his pupil. It is possible he visited England in 1625 as three drawings with a pen and washed showing a view of parliament house in London and the Westminster and dated 1625 were recorded in the 18th century. He is for the last time mentioned in Antwerp in 1626. He is recorded in Amsterdam in 1629. He was residing in Utrecht in 1632 and may have stayed there until 1637. It is also possible that he returned to Amsterdam in 1632 where he would have stayed until 1636.

In August 1637, he is recorded in London where he resided until at least 1641 and possibly until 1652. He was in the service of King Charles I for whom he painted a series of 10 or more paintings of royal castles and places in England and Scotland. He spent time working in Yorkshire and Scotland in 1639. His time in London overlapped with the residence in England of Utrecht painter Cornelis van Poelenburgh who Keirincx already knew from his time in Utrecht.

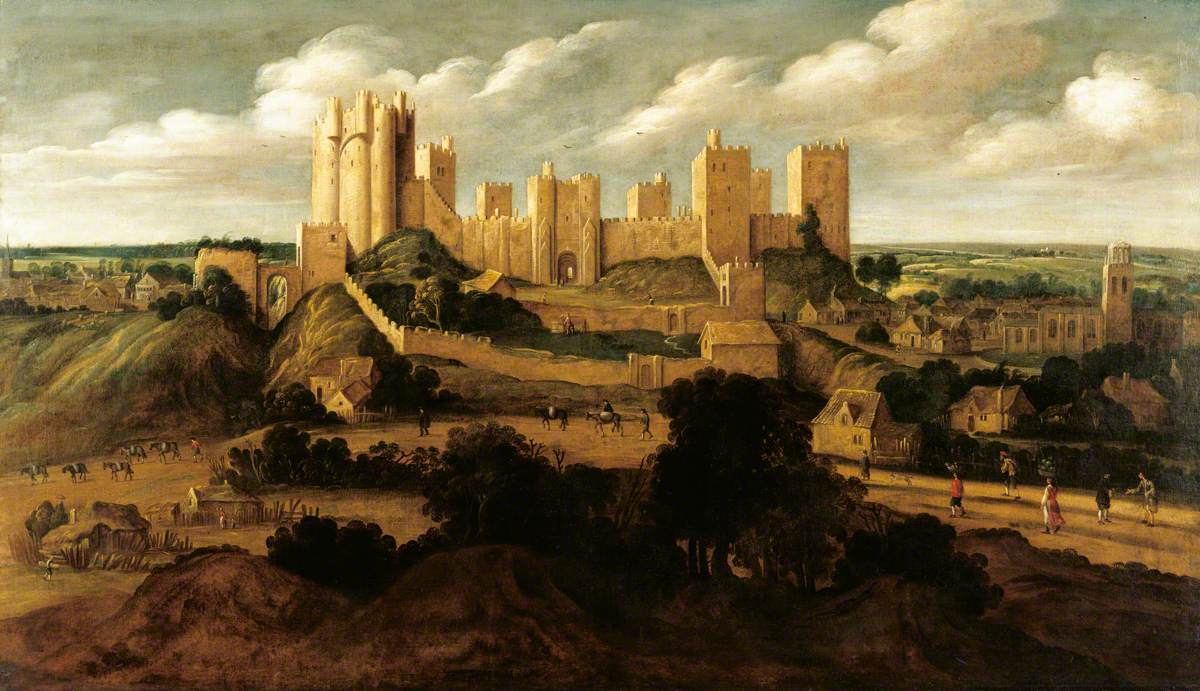
Pontefract Castle in Yorkshire

The two artists lived in the same house in Orchard Street, Westminster, and regularly collaborated with each other. Among surviving documents, a warrant for payment of rent for the dwellings of Cornelis van Poelenburgh and "Alexander Keyrnix", painters employed by the king since July 1638, was receipted by Mary Swetnam on 10 July 1649.

He returned to Amsterdam in 1641 but it is not clear whether this was only for a brief period after which he returned to England. He was clearly back in Amsterdam in 1652 as he obtained citizenship of that city on 30 January 1652. He died in Amsterdam not long before 7 October 1652.

== Work ==
Keirincx was a specialist landscape painter who is known for his wooded landscapes with figures and portrayals of English castles and country houses. His career and contributions to art history and especially to the development of painting in Britain have long been obscured by mistaken identity, lack of documentation and variant name spellings. In particular, he has erroneously been identified with the English painter Jacob or Johann Carings or Cierings (c. 1590–1646).

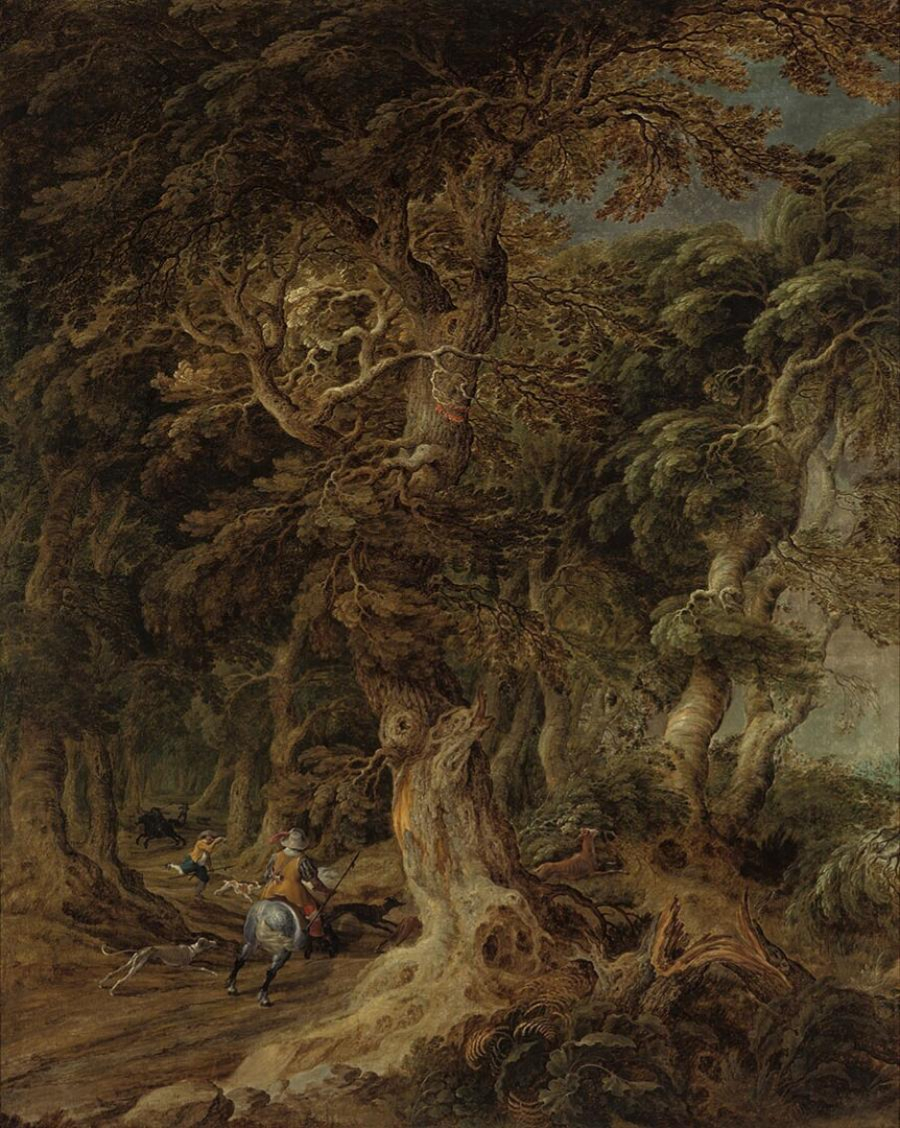
Forest view with a large oak, figures likely by Pauwels van Hillegaert

Like his presumed master Abraham Govaerts, Keirincx initially specialized in small cabinet-sized forest landscapes in the manner of Jan Brueghel the Elder and Gillis van Coninxloo. Also like Govaerts, Keirincx's early works typically show history, mythological or biblical subjects within a Mannerist three-color, schematic landscape bracketed by repoussoir trees. However, during the 1620s and 1630s, his landscapes become increasingly naturalistic, influenced by Dutch tonalism in the manner of Pieter de Molyn, Jan van Goyen and others.

A key event in Keirincx's career was his sojourn in England during which he received a commission of King Charles I of ten landscape paintings. These depicted mainly views of the king's castles and houses in Northern England and Scotland produced between May 1639 and mid-1640. Charles' commission was likely politically motivated, originally intended to celebrate his campaign and victory over the Scots during the first of the Bishops' Wars and when that didn't materialize, a face-saving measure upon the return of his properties by the Scots. One example, Distant View of York at Tate Britain, shows an important site in the campaign of the First Bishops' War. The importance of this series and its impact on later painting in Britain is hard to overstate, as Keirincx combined the aesthetic landscape tradition with that of the taste for detailed, topographical views, firmly grounded in Caroline court culture. His are the first "house portraits" which became a well-established trend in painting in Britain by the later 17th century as practiced for example by Jan Siberechts and Jan Griffier the Elder.

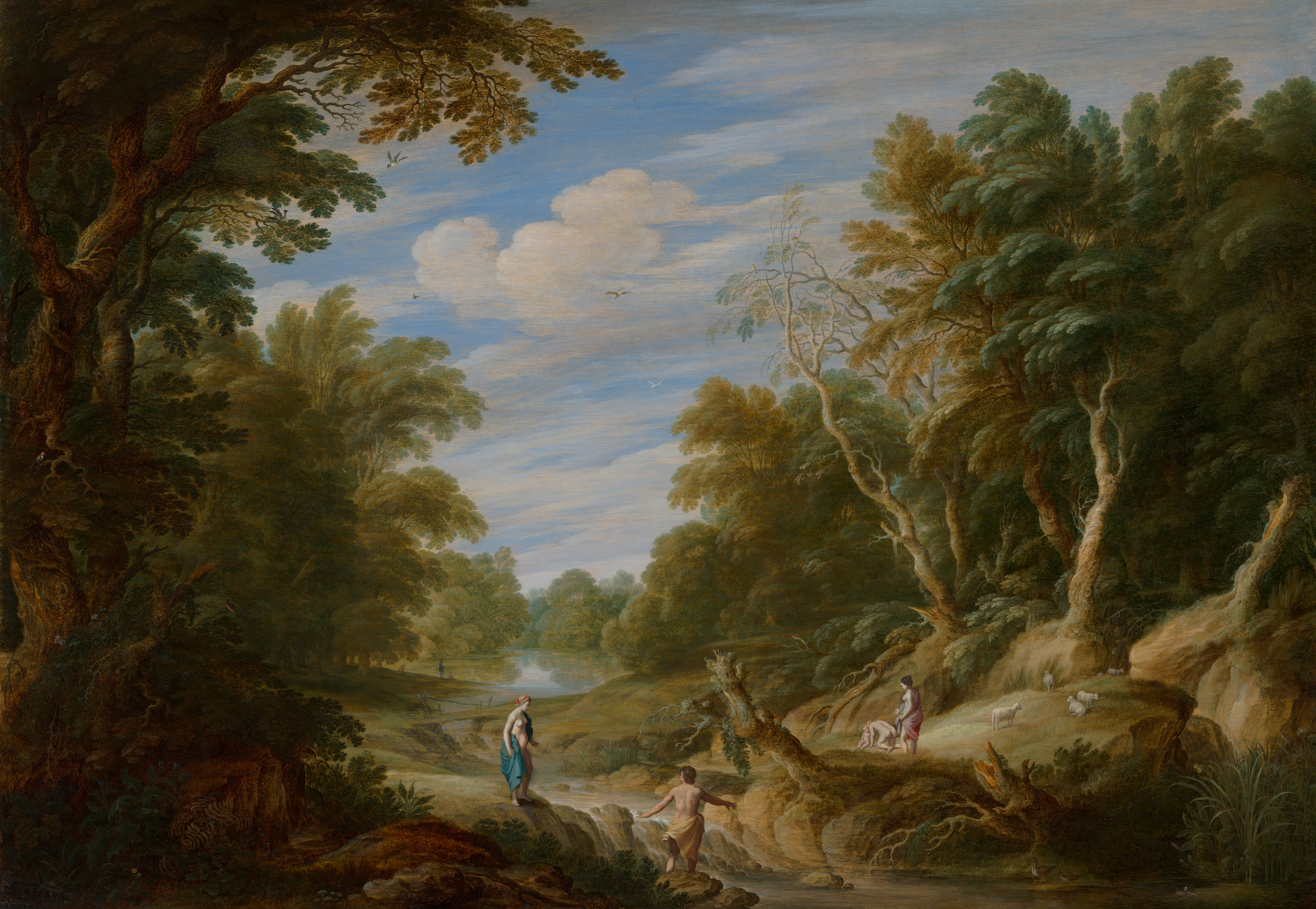
Forest landscape with figures, collaboration with Cornelis van Poelenburgh

Seventeenth-century artistic practice often relied on collaborations between specialist painters. Keirincx was the most frequent collaborator of the Dutch painter Cornelis van Poelenburgh. While the two artists lived near each other in Utrecht during the period between 1632 and 1636 and in London from 1637 to 1641, their collaboration was not limited to those years. In their collaborations Keirincx usually painted the landscape to which Poelenburgh added the figures. However, in one instance it was Poelenburgh who painted the landscape and figures to which Keirincx added a tree. Fifteen paintings have survived on which they have collaborated, but the artists likely collaborated on more works. Two of the collaborations are signed by both artists, one by Van Poelenburgh only, and most of the others by Keirincx alone. The paintings signed by both artists are the Arcadian landscape with dancing figures (1633, Kunsthalle Bremen) and the Landscape with Callisto (1629, Musée Fabre). Infrared reflectography revealed that in the Forest landscape with figures, van Poelenburgh made some adjustments to the landscape painted first by Keirincx, likely to integrate his figures better into the landscape.
