= Christoffel van Sichem the Younger =

Dutch woodcutter and engraver

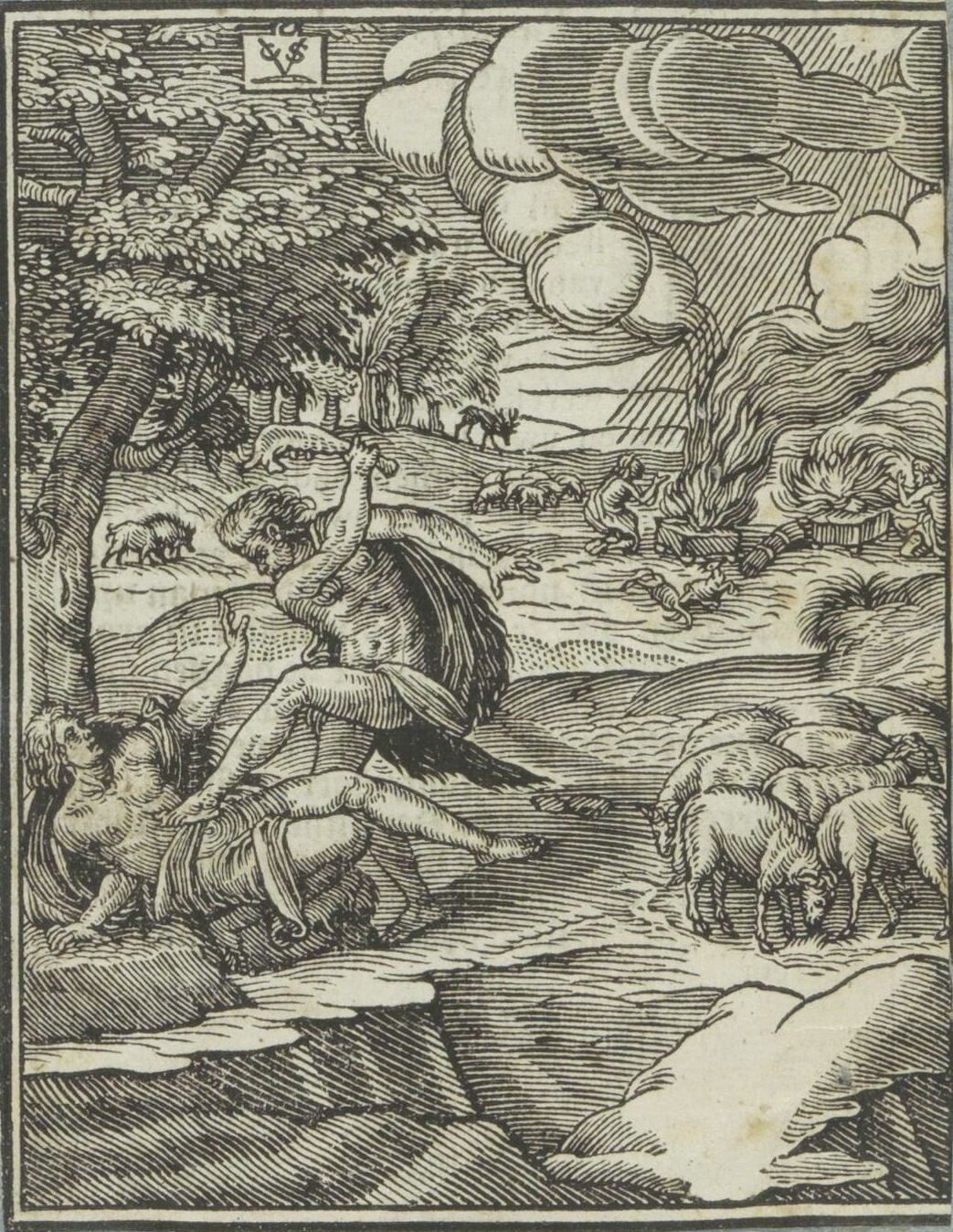
Cain kills Abel

Christoffel van Sichem the Younger (1581, Basel – 1658, Amsterdam) was a Dutch woodcutter, engraver and publisher. He was mainly active as a reproductive artist making prints after the prints or paintings of other artists.

== Life ==
He was a member of the second generation of a Roman Catholic family of Dutch engravers and publishers, who for four generations created and published a wide variety of prints used as illustrations in books and as loose pictures. He was born in Basel as the son of Christoffel van Sichem the Elder and Catalijn Serwouters. His father was originally from Amsterdam and had moved in 1570 to Basel where he was active as a printmaker and publisher. His mother was originally from Antwerp. He had a brother Karel (or Carel), who was also a printmaker and publisher, and a sister Catharyne. His family moved in 1599 to Amsterdam. In 1602 he moved to Leiden and in 1606 to Amsterdam.

On 23 March 1613 he married in Amsterdam Anneken Lunden from Antwerp. His wife was the sister of Berend (or Barend) Lunden, a laundry bleacher originally from Antwerp, who had married his sister Catharyne. Through this marriage he became the uncle of the painter Gerrit Lundens, the son of Berend Lunden and his sister Catharyne. The couple had four children Janneke van Sichem, Anna van Sichem (1617- ?), Christoffel van Sichem (III) (1618–1659) and Barend Christoffelsz van Sichem (1620–1639). The two sons also became printmakers.

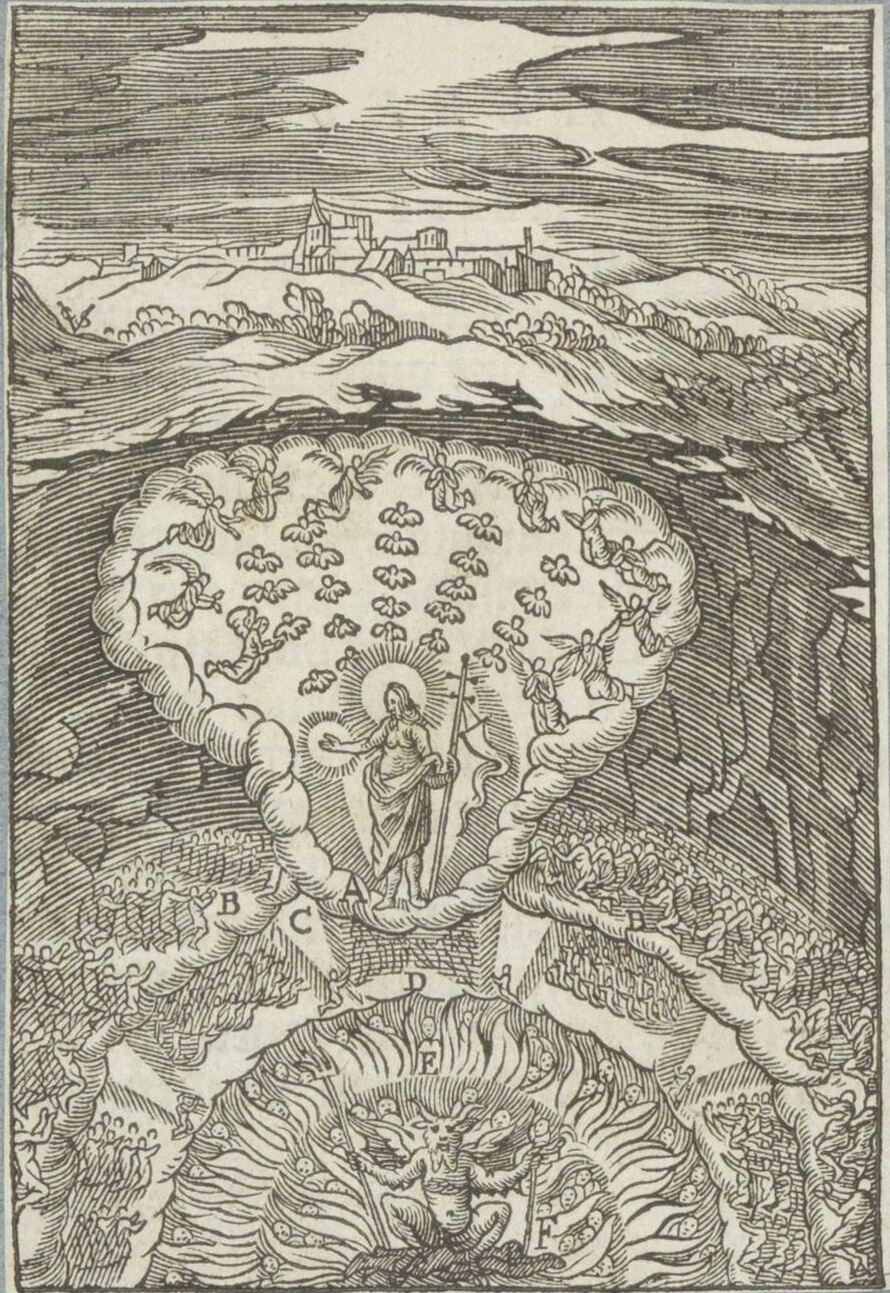
Christ in Limbo

After the death of his first wife he married on 10 September 1633 in Amsterdam Marritje Joosten (died before 31 July 1642). The couple had two daughters both named Catrijna, of whom the first one was born in 1633 and died in 1638 and the second one was born in 1638.

He died in Amsterdam where he was buried in Amsterdam on 7 February 1658.

== Work ==
He was mainly active as a reproductive artist, making prints after the prints or paintings of other artists, including Abraham Bloemaert, Hendrick Goltzius, Hans Holbein, and Maarten van Heemskerck, among others. He made a series of woodcuts of famous people after prints of his father. His prints were included in various publications. He also published a collection of his works in "Der zielen Lust-Hof' published 1646.

== Selected works ==
- Bibels tresoor, ofte Der zielen lvsthof by Christoffel van Sichem, Pieter Jacobsz. Paets, Leuven & Amsterdam, 1646
- 't Schat der zielen, dat is: het geheele leven ons Heeren Iesu Christi: naer de vyer euangelisten by C. van Sichem & H. Hugo, P.I. Paets, Amsterdam, 1648
