= Magdalena van den Hecken =

Dutch Golden Age flower painter

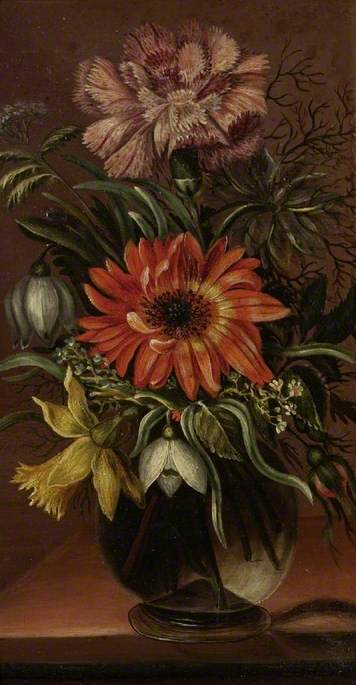
- Born: 1615; Antwerp
- Died: after 1635; Amsterdam
- Known for: Painting
- Movement: Dutch Golden Age

Magdalena van den Hecken (1615 – after 1635) was a Dutch Golden Age flower painter from the Northern Netherlands.

== Biography ==
=== Early life ===
Van den Hecken may have been born in Antwerp. She is the daughter of the painter Samuel van den Hecken and moved with her family to Amsterdam.

=== Education ===
Magadalena's father joined the Antwerp Guild of Saint Luke in 1617 as a master painter.

== Paintings ==
Magdalena mostly painted flowers, which were in the medium of oil paint. She also painted in insects and animals.

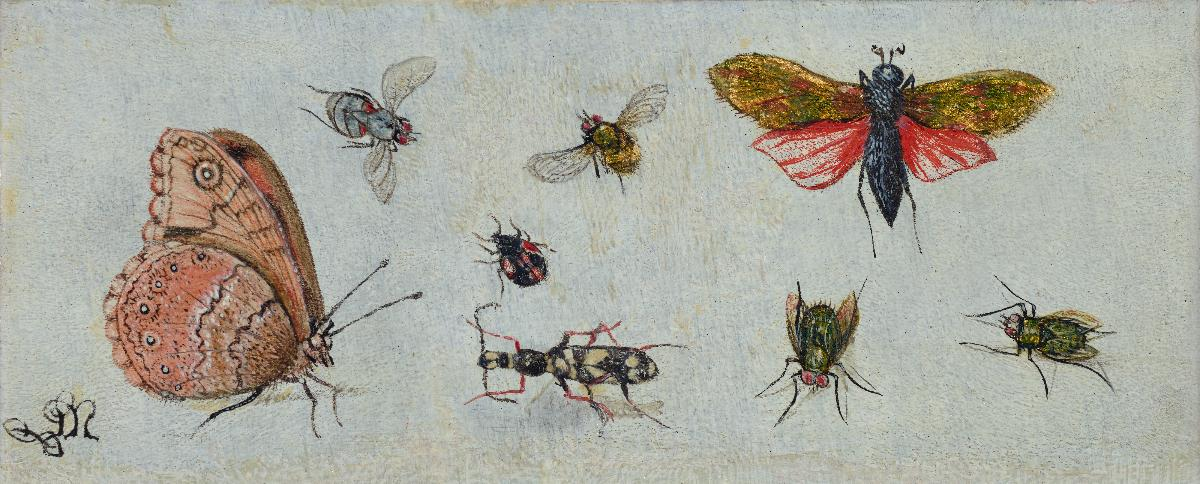

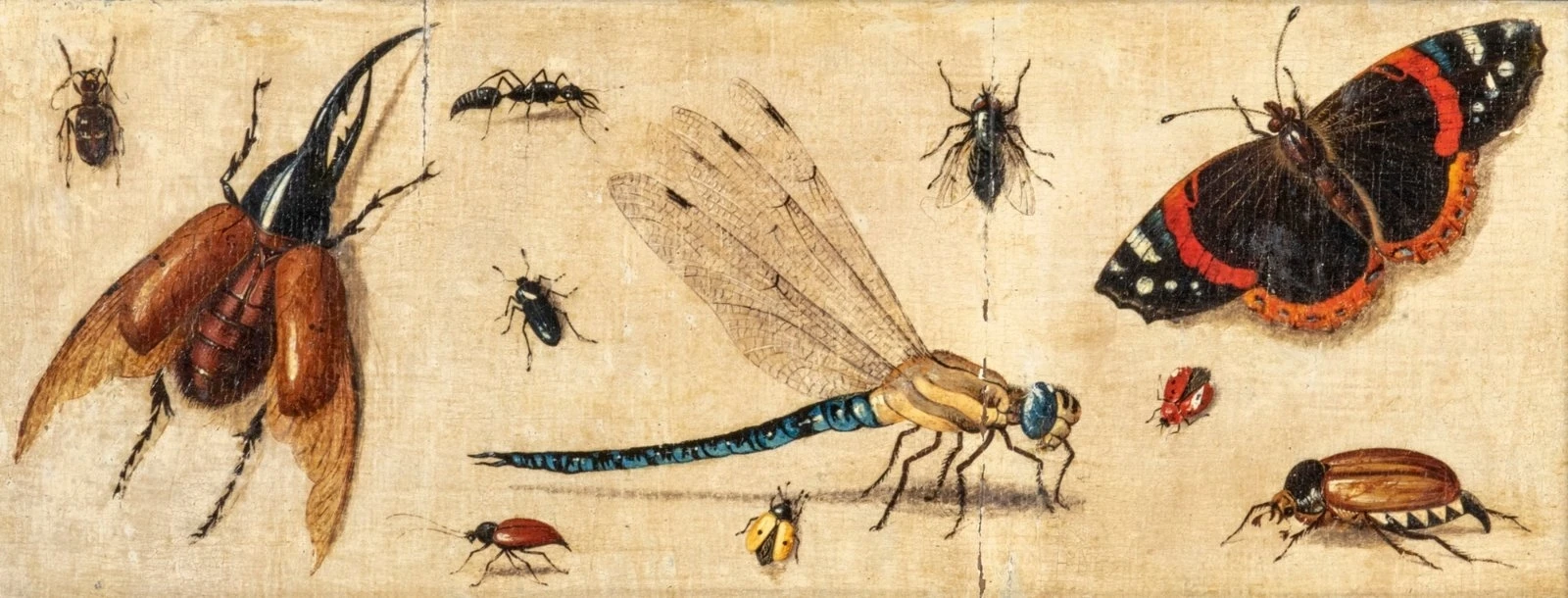
Insekten

== Legacy ==
Several of Magdalena's works are located at the Fitzwilliam Museum, in Cambridge, two in the Kunsthaus Zürich.
