= Repoussoir =

Artistic technique

In two-dimensional works of art, such as painting, printmaking, photography or bas-relief, repoussoir (French: [ʁəpuswaʁ], pushing back) is a figure or object along the right or left foreground that directs the viewer's eye into the composition by bracketing (framing) the edge and creating a greater sense of depth. Museum terminology based on the Getty Art & Architecture Thesaurus defines it as an element placed in the immediate foreground of a pictorial composition to direct the spectator's eye into the picture.

It became popular with Mannerist and Baroque artists, and is found frequently in Dutch seventeenth-century landscape paintings. Jacob van Ruisdael, for example, often included a tree along one side to enclose the scene (see illustration). The device was also typical of the landscapes of Gaspard Dughet, and J. M. W. Turner used it in an 1839 sketch of Dinant and Bouvignes on the Meuse. Figures are also commonly employed as repoussoir devices by artists such as Paolo Veronese, Peter Paul Rubens and Impressionist such as Gustave Caillebotte.

The term was in use among French painters by the 18th century: the 1762 edition of the Dictionnaire de l'Académie française records that painters called repoussoirs strongly coloured or deeply shaded objects placed in the foreground of a picture to make the other objects appear farther away.

Examples of repoussoir

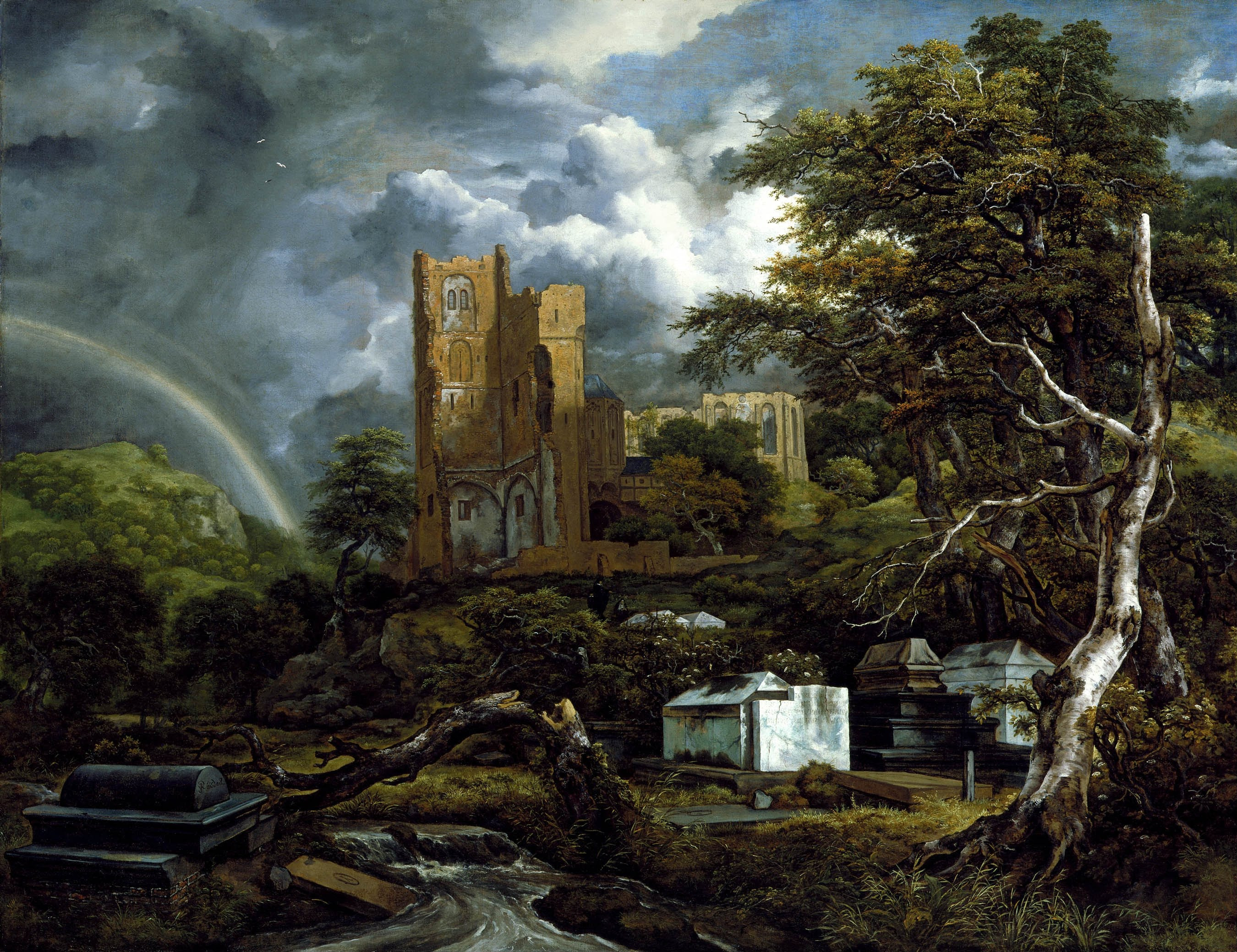
Jacob Isaaksz. van Ruisdael, The Jewish Cemetery (1655–60, oil on canvas, 141 x 182.9 cm). The tree in the right-foreground of Ruisdael's painting is an example of repoussoir that pushes the viewer's eye into the composition.

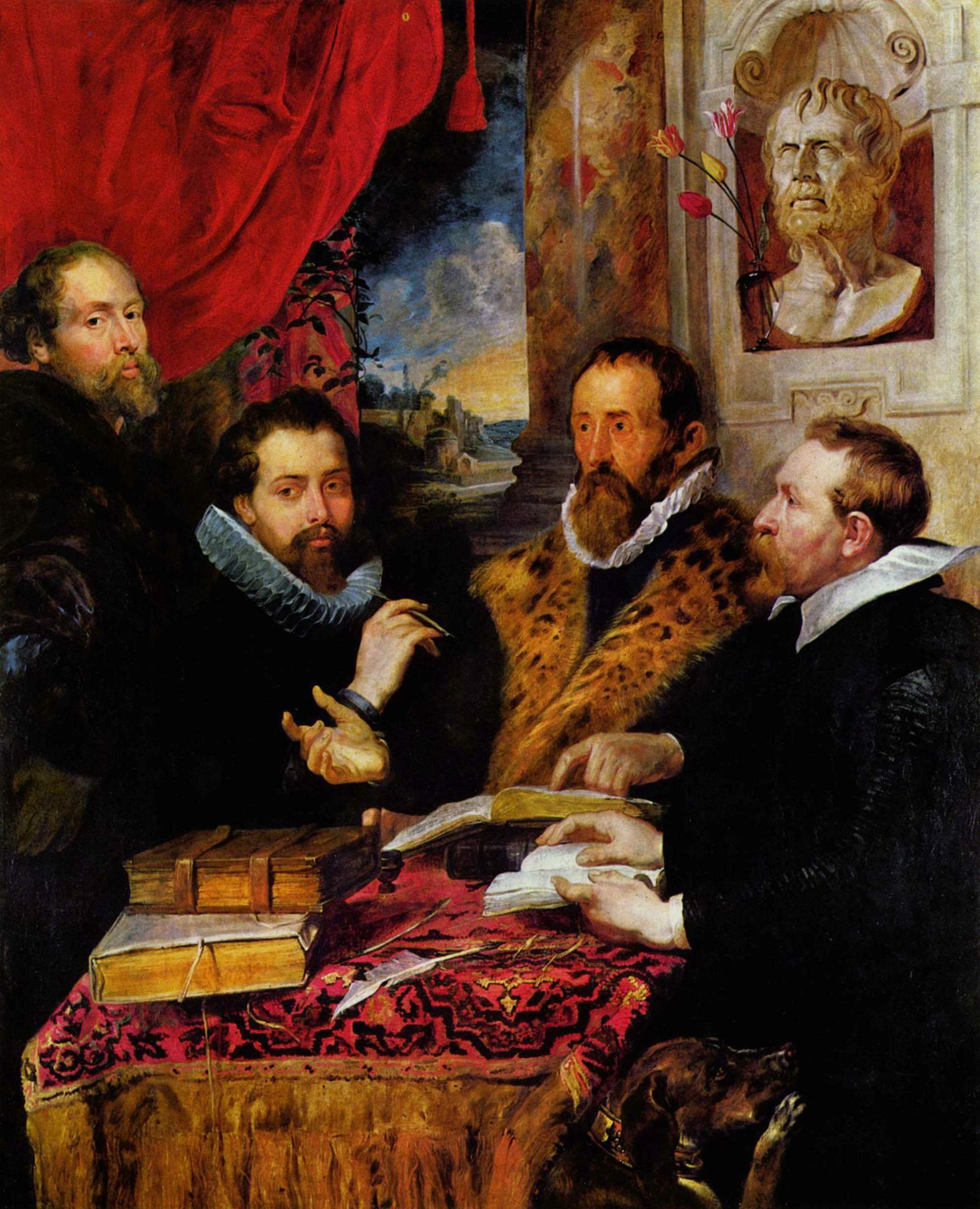
The Four Philosophers (c. 1615. Oil on panel; 167 x 143 cm, Pitti Palace, Florence). In his friendship portrait of himself, his brother Philip Rubens, Justus Lipsius and Jan van den Wouwer (left to right), the Flemish painter Peter Paul Rubens's self-portrait on the left is an example of a figural repoussoir that is further accentuated by the flowing red curtain.

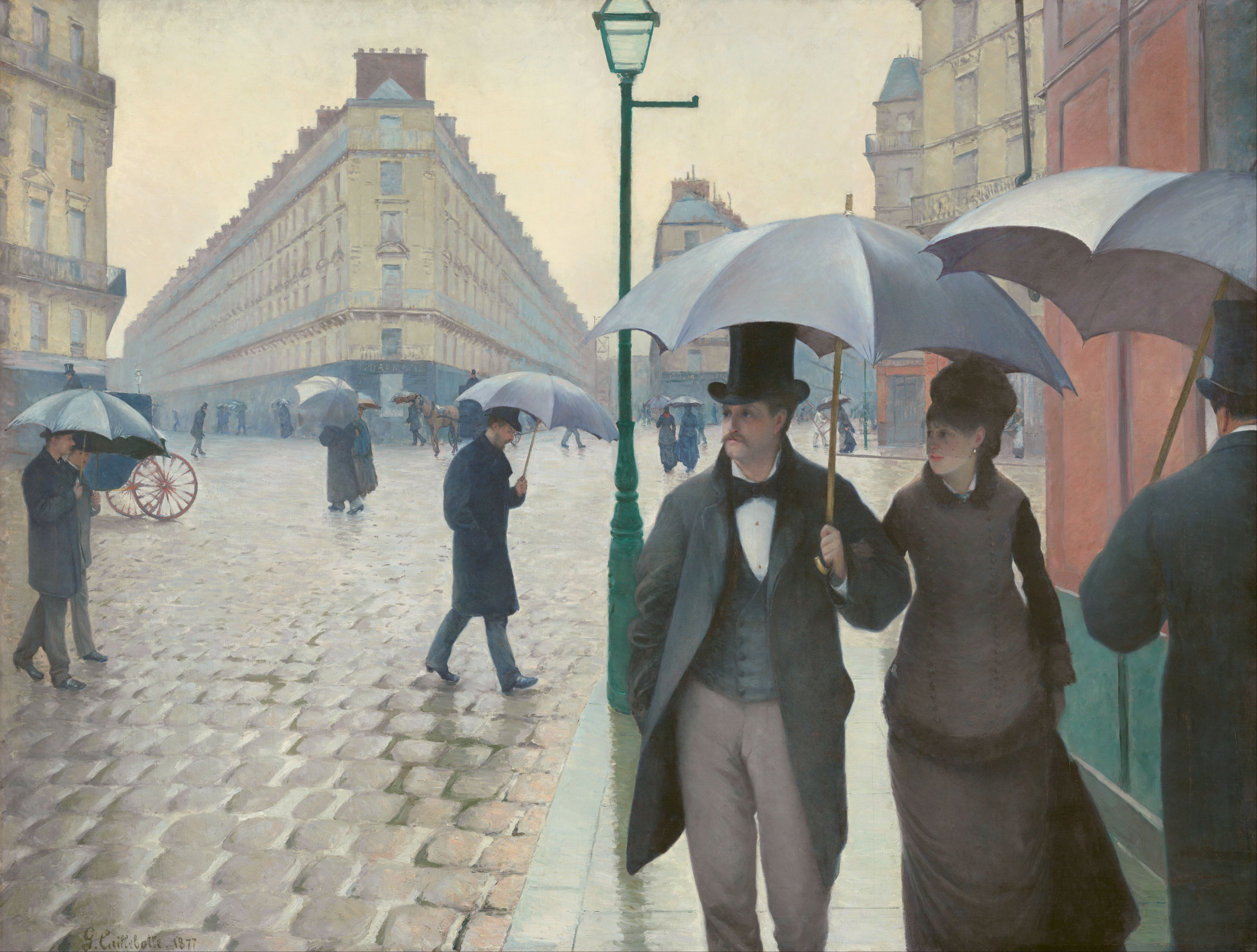
Gustave Caillebotte. Paris Street; Rainy Day (1877, Art Institute of Chicago). The rear-facing man on the right with the tilted umbrella is an example of repoussoir figure leading the viewer's gaze into the composition.

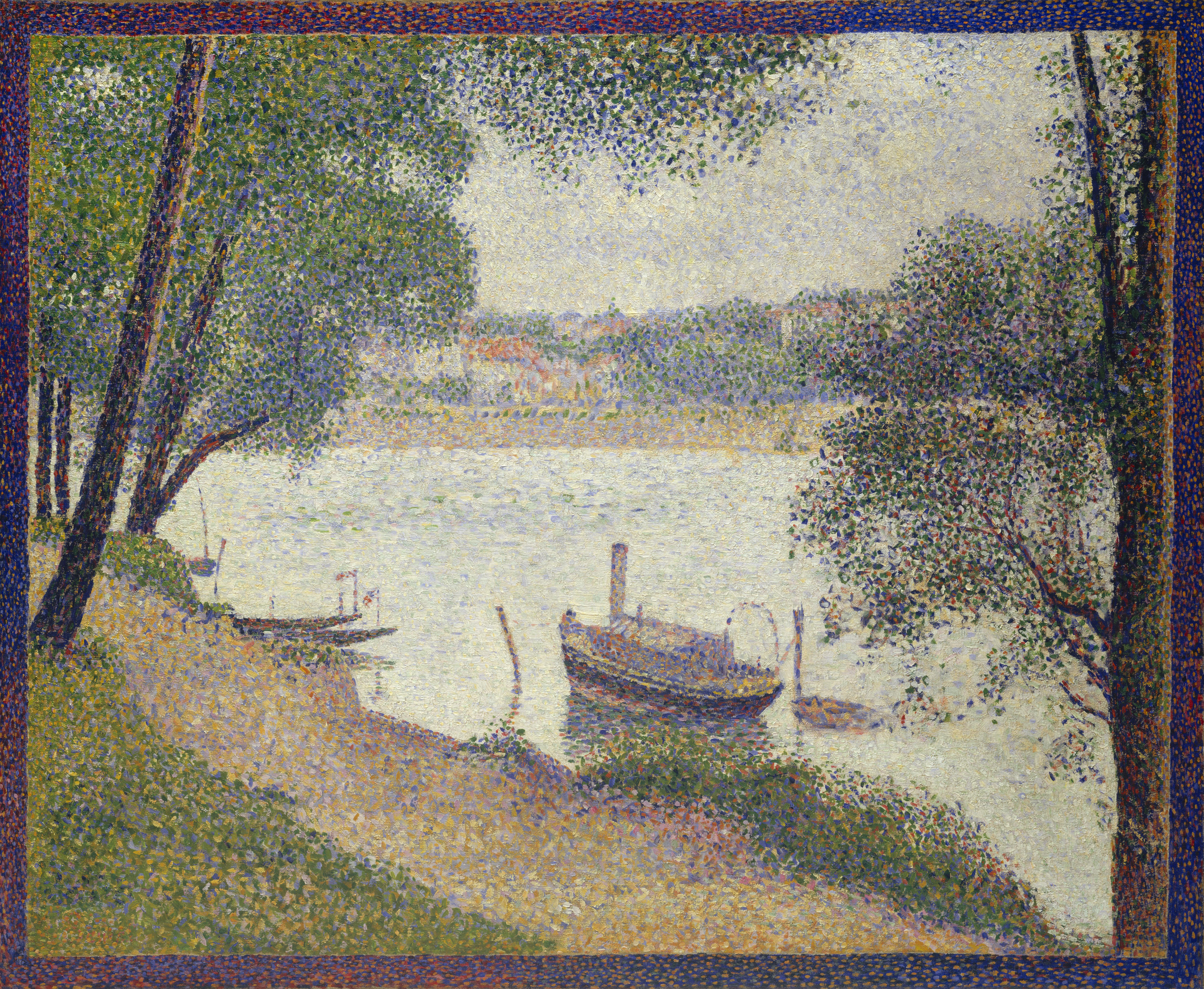
Georges Seurat, Gray Weather, Grande Jatte (1888, 71 × 66 cm, oil on canvas, Metropolitan Museum of Art). In a similar manner to the van Ruisdael piece, the tree that takes up the entire right edge of this work is an example of repoussoir.
