= Kunst (surname) =

Kunst is a Dutch, German and Ashkenazic Jewish surname It may be patronymic in origin, meaning Coenraad's, Konrad's or Constant's son. Notable people with the surname include:

- Three Dutch Renaissance painter brothers, sons of Cornelis Engebrechtsz
  - Pieter Cornelisz Kunst (c. 1487–c.1560)
  - Cornelis Cornelisz Kunst (1493–1544)
  - Lucas Cornelisz Kunst (1495–1552)
- Bob Kunst (born 1941), American human and civil rights activist
- Dave Kunst (born 1939), American who was the first person to officially walk around the Earth.
- Fritz Kunst (1899–1979), German politician
- Gustav Kunst (1836–1905), German (Hamburg) merchant
- Jaap Kunst (1891–1960), Dutch ethnomusicologist
- Jorrit Kunst (born 1989), Dutch footballer
- Kenny Kunst (born 1986), Curaçaoan footballer
- Marco Kunst (born 1966), Dutch writer
- Renae Kunst, Australian rugby player
- Sabine Kunst (born 1954), German University President and politician
- Wilhelm Kunst (actor) (1799–1859), German actor
- Wilhelm Kunst (1909–1986), German sculptor

== See also ==
- Code Kunst, stage name of Jo Sung-woo (born 1989), South Korean rapper and producer
