= Kunst =

Kunst may refer to:

- Kunst (surname), a surname
- Kunst (album), a 2013 album by industrial music band KMFDM
- Art, a word for art in the Estonian, Danish, Dutch, German, and Norwegian languages

== See also ==
- Heimkveld Kunst, an ambient music group
- VOF de Kunst, a Dutch pop group
- Bunch of Kunst, a documentary about the musical group Sleaford Mods
