= Aertgen van Leyden =

Dutch painter and stained glass designer

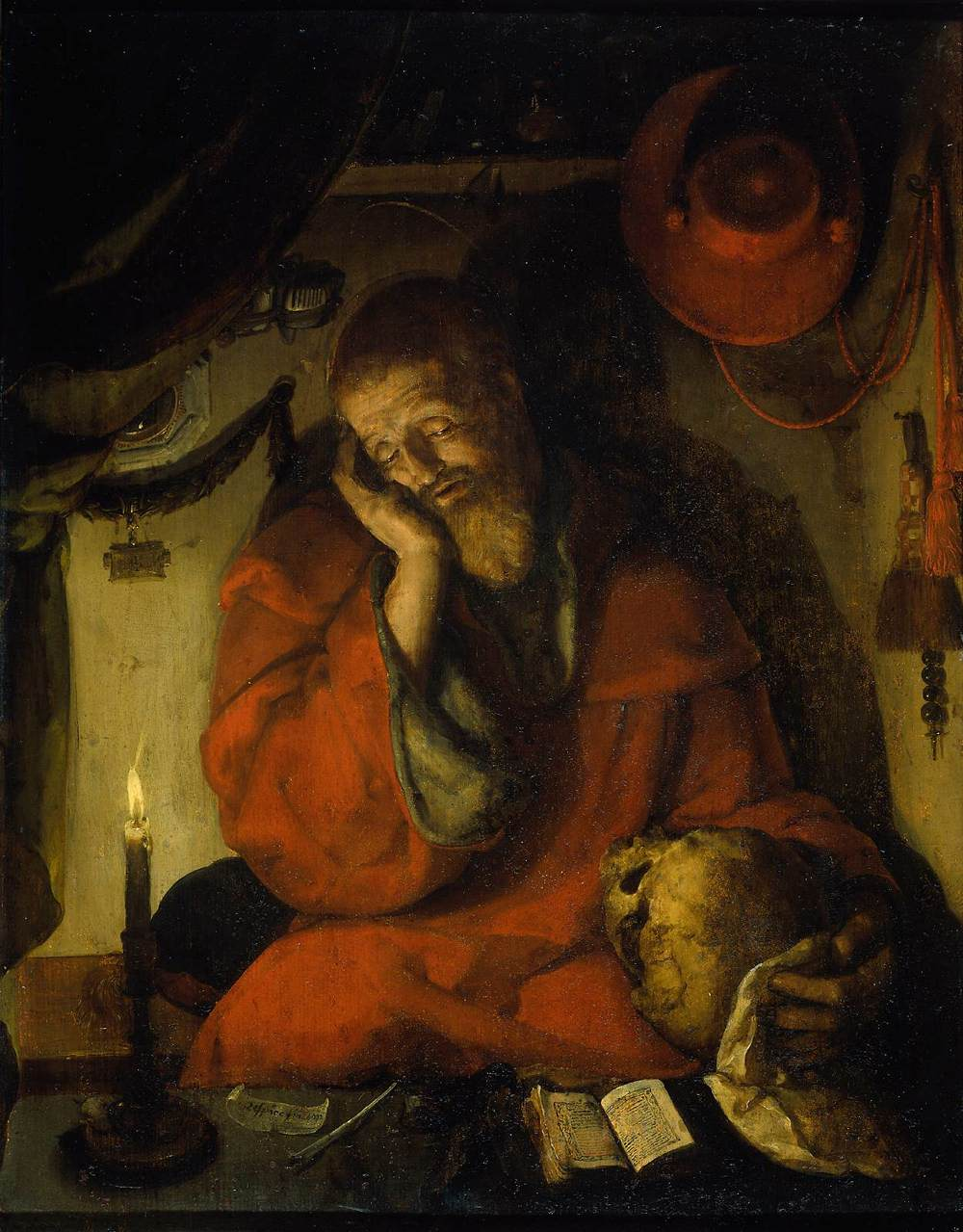
St. Jerome in his study by candlelight, ca. 1520.

Aertgen Claesz. van Leyden (c. 1498 – c. 1564), also known as Allaert or Aert van Leyden or Aert Claesz. van Leyden, was a 16th-Century Dutch painter, draughtsman and designer of stained glass. Works by this artist can be found at the Rijksmuseum in Amsterdam, Stedelijk Museum De Lakenhal in Leiden, the Metropolitan Museum of Art in New York and Museo Thyssen-Bornemisza in Madrid.

According to the biographer Karel van Mander (1604), Van Leyden was a son of a Leiden fuller. In 1516, he became an apprentice to the Leiden painter Cornelis Engebrechtsz. Some sources incorrectly name Aertgen van Leyden as a brother of Lucas van Leyden; in fact, Lucas van Leyden was the son of a painter, Hugo Jacobsz.

Van Leydens early work was influenced by the style of his mentor, Engebrechtsz., while his later works shows influences by Jan van Scorel and Maarten van Heemskerck, among others. Van Leyden's style was very diverse, making it difficult to attribute paintings to him with certainty. Most of this works were attributed to other artists, and only in the 20th Century were a number of paintings attributed to him, including a triptych of the Last Judgment which was recovered in Valenciennes in 1969, and a painting now in the Rijksmuseum, The Calling of St. Anthony, which had been attributed to Lucas van Leyden until 1960.

According to the Leiden city records, Aertgen van Leyden lived and worked in Leiden from 1521 to 1564. In 1564, Aertgen van Leyden drowned in the Vollersgracht canal in Leiden.

Aertgen van Leyden's work remained in demand after his death. Rubens owned one of his paintings. The 1656 list of Rembrandt's possessions also includes several works by Aertgen van Leyden.

In 2009, Stedelijk Museum De Lakenhal in Leiden purchased a triptych by Aertgen van Leyden dating to about 1530. This work, depicting the Last Judgment, will be part of an exhibition on Lucas van Leyden which the museum will organise in 2011, together with the Rijksmuseum and the Metropolitan Museum of Art.

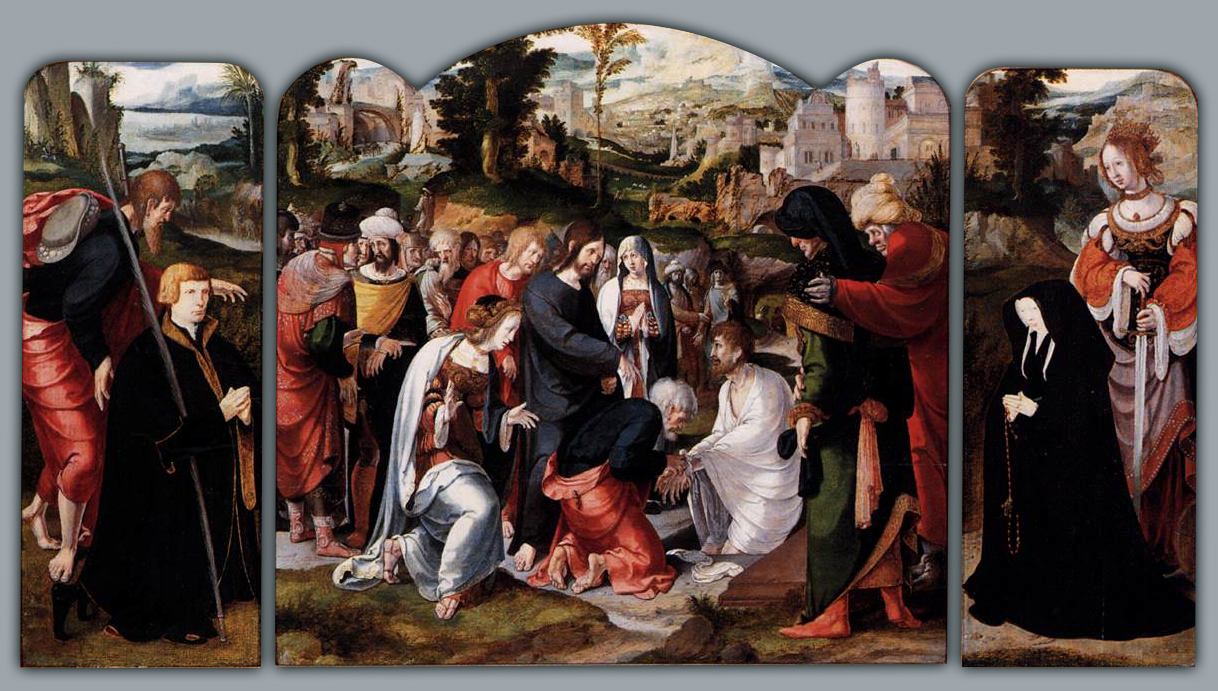
Triptych with the raising of Lazarus, circa 1530

== See also ==
- Dutch and Flemish Renaissance painting

== Sources ==
- Rijksmuseum Amsterdam
- The Grove Dictionary of Art
- Art Encyclopedia
- Oxford Dictionary of Art
- Encyclopédie Larousse
