= Jan Wellens de Cock =

Flemish painter (1490–1527)

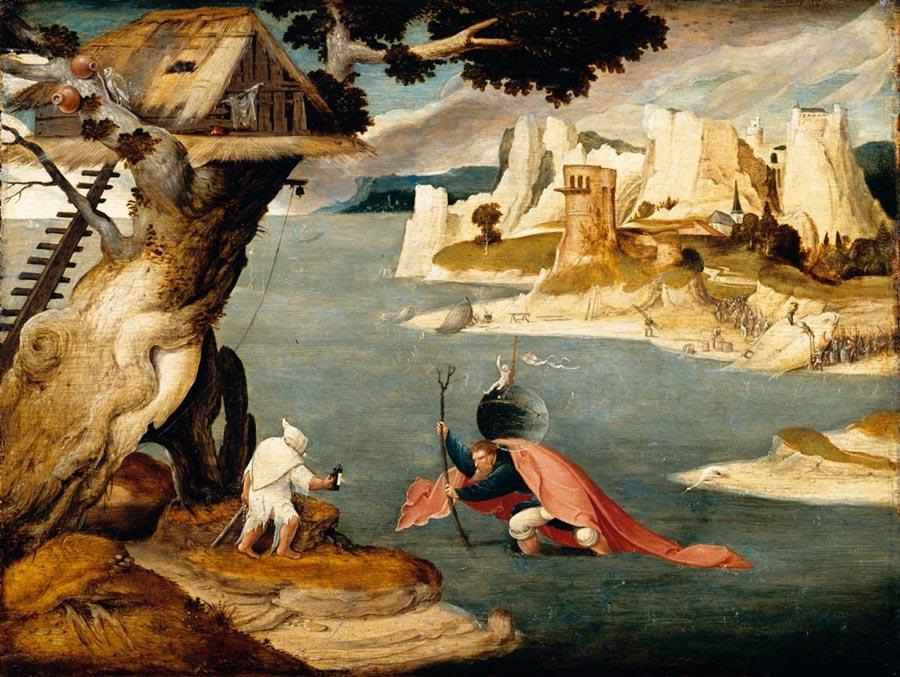
Pseudo Jan Wellens de Cock, Saint Christopher carrying the Christ Child in an extensive river landscape, formerly collection of Friedrich von Bissing

Jan Wellens de Cock or Jan de Cock (c. 1460/1480 – in or before 1521) was a Flemish painter, woodblock artist and draftsman of the Northern Renaissance active in Antwerp. Recent discoveries and a re-evaluation of the links between the works attributed to Wellens de Cock and those of contemporaneous artists of Leiden have caused a large portion and potentially all of the works formerly attributed to him to be re-attributed to one or more anonymous artists active in Antwerp or Leiden referred to by the notname Pseudo Jan Wellens de Cock or Master J. Kock or some other anonymous artists believed to have worked in Leiden in the studio or immediate circle of Cornelis Engebrechtsz.

== Life ==
Little is known about the artist's life and career. Traditionally the artist's likely place of birth was identified as Leiden in the County of Holland. This was based on stylistic similarities of the works attributed to him with paintings by Cornelis Engebrechtsz who worked in Leiden. As those works are no longer attributed to the artist, there is no longer a basis for the presumed birth or origin in Leiden. In 1883 Frans Jozef Peter van den Branden identified the Jan de Cock mentioned several times in the records of the Antwerp Guild of Saint Luke with the 'Jan Wellens, alias Cock' recorded in the aldermen's registers of Antwerp in 1492.

The art historian Max Jakob Friedländer, referring to the artist as 'Jan de Cock', identified him with the 'Jan Van Leyen' (Jan of Leiden) who became a master in the Antwerp Guild of Saint Luke in the guild year 1503–1504. No further information about this Jan van Leyen exists to support an identification with Jan de Cock.

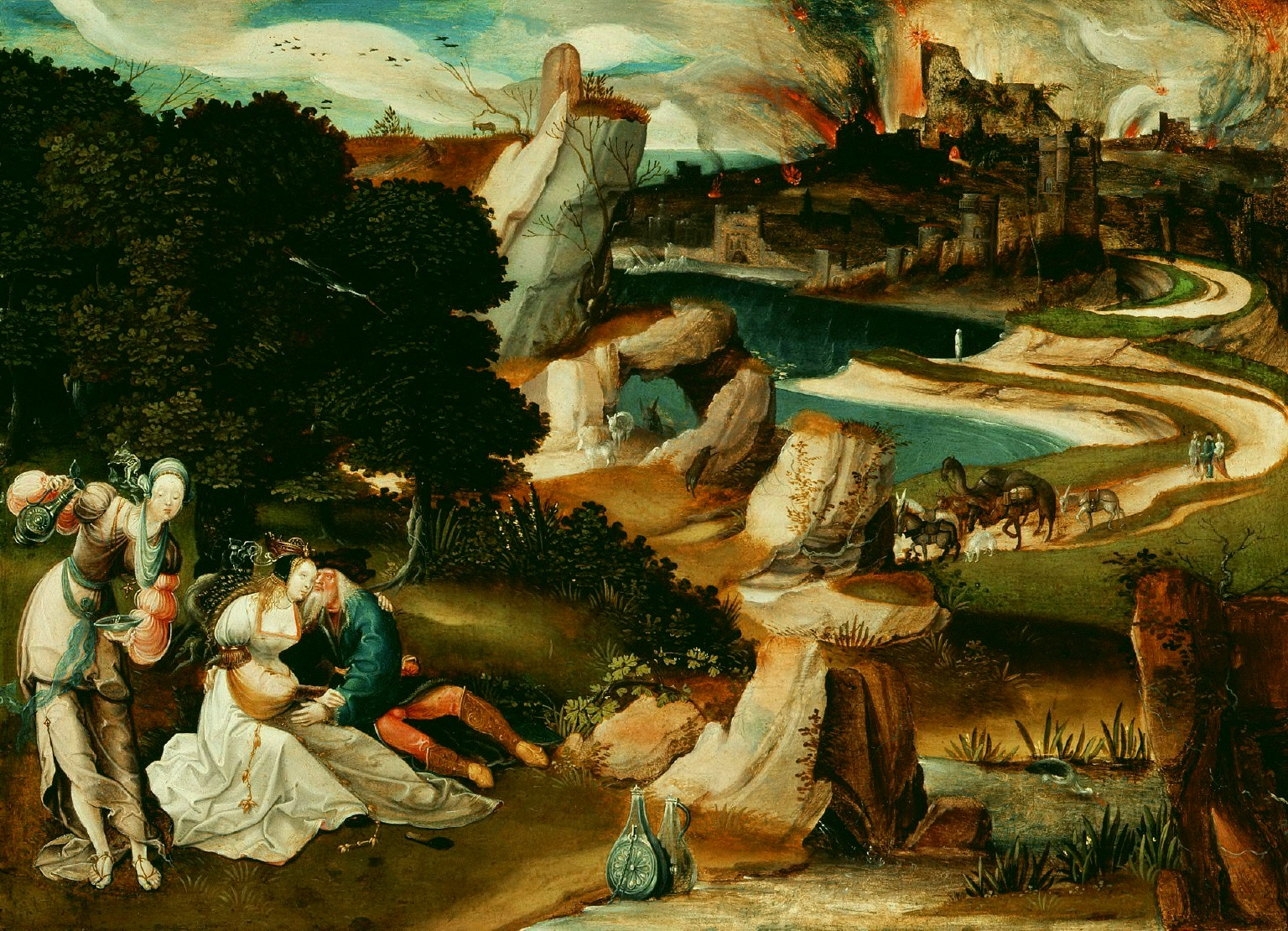
Pseudo Jan Wellens de Cock, Lot and his daughters, Detroit Institute of Arts

On 6 August 1502 Jan Wellens de Cock married Clara van Beeringen, the daughter of Peter van Beeringen. Their two sons played an important role in the cultural life of the Habsburg Netherlands in the first half of the 16th century: Matthys Cock (1505–1548) was a landscape artist and Hieronymus Cock (1518–1570) originally trained as a painter and landscape artist before becoming a prolific publisher and printmaker.

The records of the Guild of Saint Luke of Antwerp record the following pupils of Jan de Cock: a 'Loduwyck' in 1505 and a Wouter Key in 1516. Jan Wellens de Cock was probably identical to the 'Jan de Cock' that worked as a servant to the guild of 'Onze-Lieve-Vrouw Lof' for which he executed many commissions over the next few years. In 1507 de Cock was paid for painting angels and restoring the Holy Ghost at the altar of this guild in Antwerp Cathedral. He also worked on commissions for the brotherhood of Onze-Lieve-Vrouw-Lof in Antwerp. These works were probably lost in the iconoclastic destruction of mainly religious images and statues known as the beeldenstorm that raged in parts of the Low Countries in 1566. In 1511 the guild paid de Cock for cutting a woodblock for a print to use in the guild's procession. This is the only indication that de Cock, to whom several prints have been attributed, was indeed active as a block cutter.

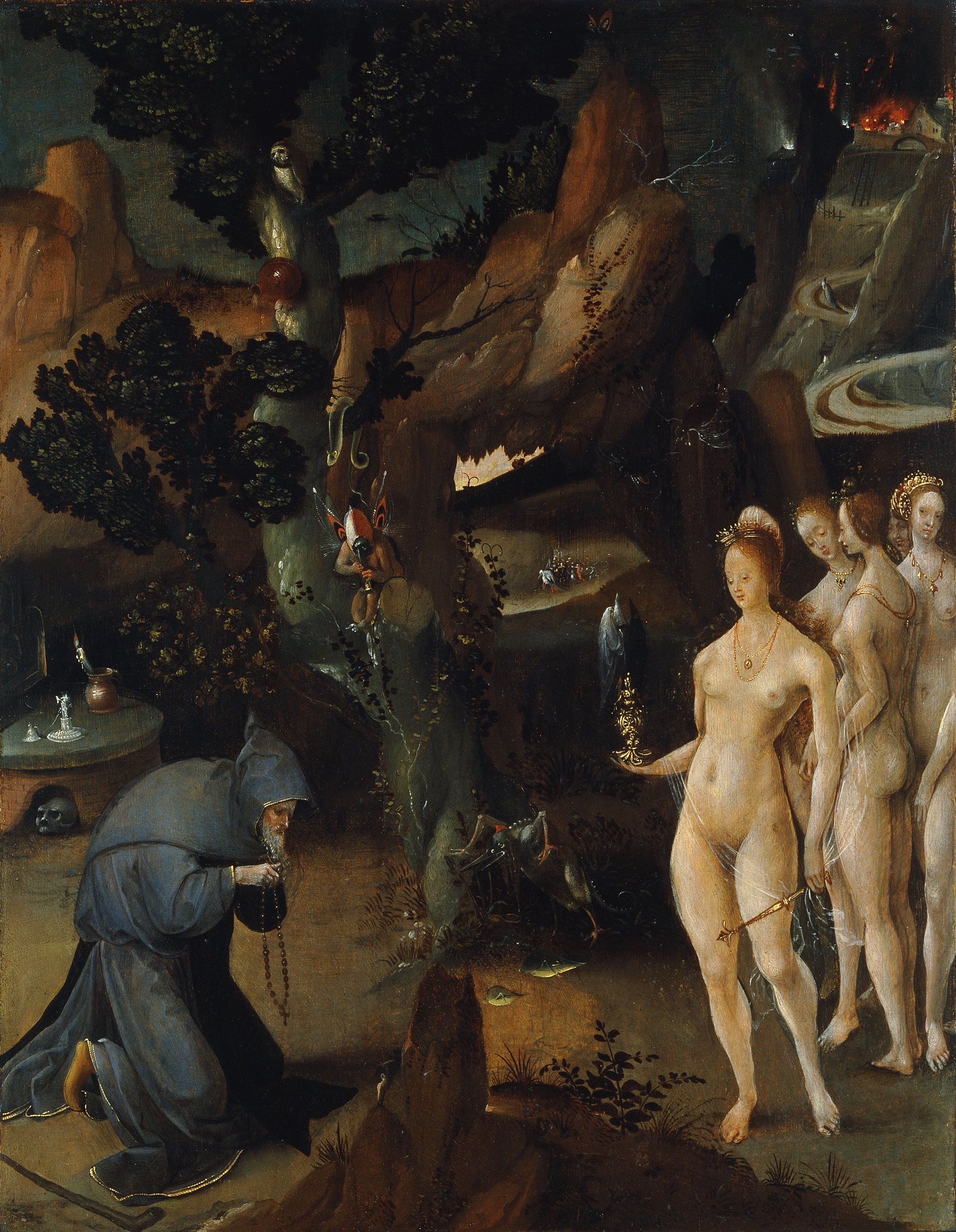
Workshop of Pseudo Jan Wellens de Cock, The Temptation of St. Anthony, Thyssen-Bornemisza Museum

In 1520 Jan de Cock served as a dean of the Guild of Saint Luke, together with Joos van Cleve. His death date and place are not documented. His wife Clara van Beeringen is mentioned as a widow in 1521 in the reports of the brotherhood of Onze-Lieve-Vrouw-Lof in Antwerp, which means that he must have died in 1520 or 1521.

== Pseudo Jan Wellens de Cock and Master J. Kock ==
Friedländer constructed an entire oeuvre around the artist based on an anonymous print depicting Saint Christopher carrying the Christ Child. Underneath the image the print bears the Latin expression ‘Pictum J. Kock’ (painted by J. Kock), which suggests that the print was carved after a painting by a 'J. Cock'. Friedländer identified that painting as the painting of the same subject and the same content which in the first half of the 20th century was in the collection of Friedrich von Bissing in Munich (and which was most recently sold on 8 December 2004 at Sotheby's, London). While no works signed by Jan Wellens de Cock have been located, Friedländer gave him a few small panels with saints and religious subjects starting from the aforementioned print depicting Saint Christopher carrying the Christ Child. Friedländer pointed to the apparent influence on these works of both landscape painter Joachim Patinir active in Antwerp and Hieronymus Bosch active in 's-Hertogenbosch. He further noted the stylistic similarities to paintings from the school of Leiden painter Cornelis Engebrechtsz and therefore surmised that Jan de Cock was originally from Leiden. The works he attributed to the artist also showed parallels with the works of the Antwerp Mannerists. Referring to the artist as 'Jan de Cock', Friedländer surmised he was possibly the 'Jan Van Leyen' (Jan of Leiden) who became a master in the Antwerp Guild of Saint Luke in the guild year 1503–1504 or that he had become a master in 1500, a year in which the Guild failed to register its new masters in its records.

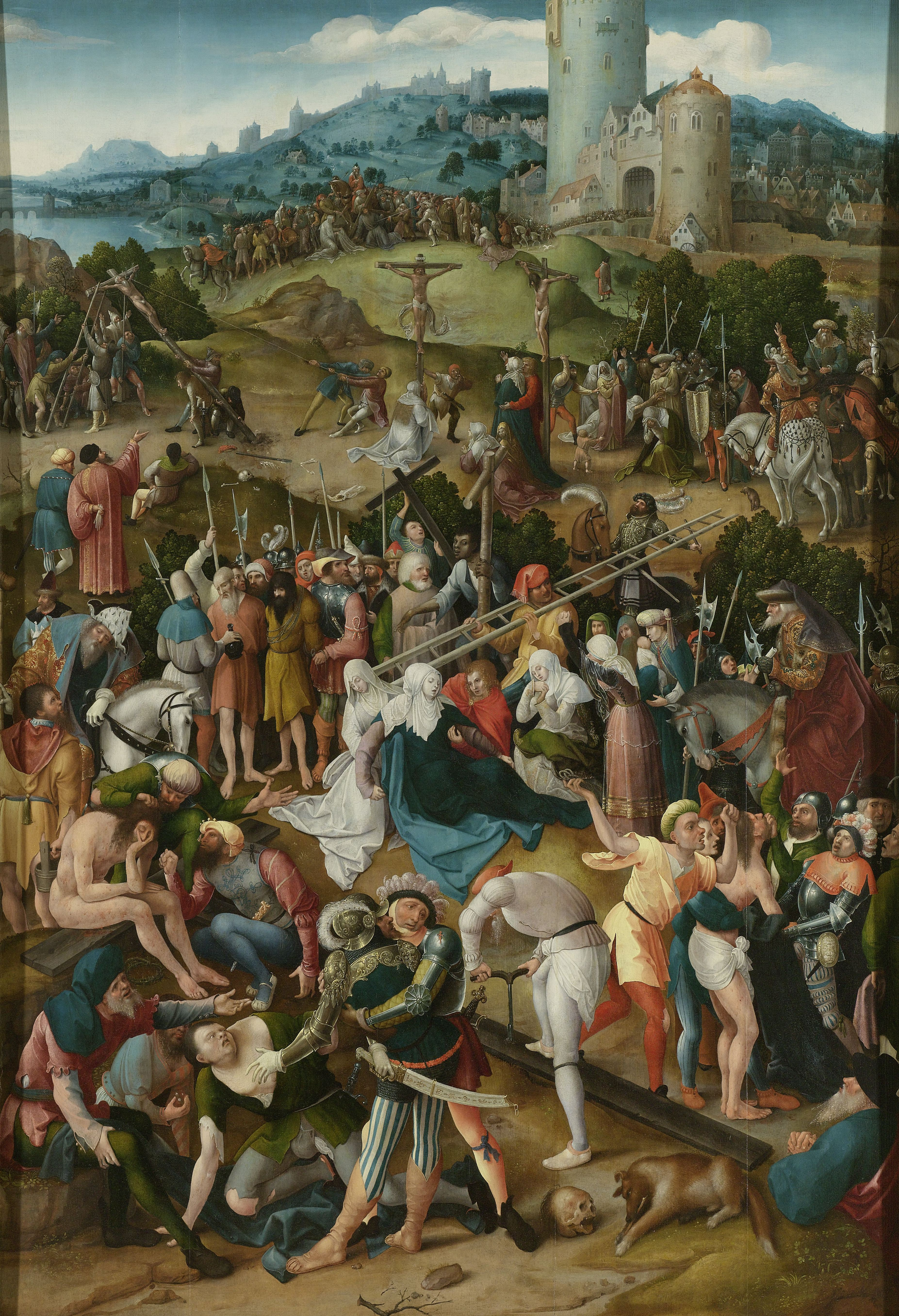
Pseudo Jan Wellens de Cock, Calvary, Rijksmuseum

Friedländer's attributions were questioned by other art historian who highlighted the similarities of the attributed works with works by presumed pupils of Cornelis Engebrechtsz of Leiden. In addition, when it was discovered that Jan Welllens de Cock had died no later than 1521, many attributions to him could no longer be sustained as these attributed works were datable to the 1520s.

Many of the works that Friedländer attributed to de Cock have since been reassigned by Dutch art historians Nicolaas Beets, Godefridus Johannes Hoogewerff, Jan Piet Filedt Kok and others, to some of Engebrechtsz's pupils, such as his sons Cornelis Cornelisz and Lucas Cornelisz named De Cock. Ludwig von Baldass distinguished two different hands in the body of work: Jan de Cock and an anonymous master he gave the notname the Master of the Vienna Dismissal of Hagar. Art historian Walter S. Gibson subsequently attributed the works that Baldass had given to Jan de Cock to an anonymous master he gave the notname the Master of the Vienna Lamentation, and proposed the hypothesis that both of these anonymous masters had been pupils and assistants of Cornelis Engebrechtsz, and could possibly have been his aforementioned sons.

There is currently a growing art-historical consensus that the paintings attributed to Jan Wellens de Cock over the years were in fact executed by different hands, and probably not by the Antwerp artist Jan de Cock. There is no certainty that they originated in either Antwerp or Leiden. As none of the works can be confidently linked to the Antwerp painter Jan de Cock, art historians have proposed to catalogue them under the notname Pseudo Jan Wellens de Cock or under Master J. Kock (based on the name of the aforementioned print).
