= Lucas Cornelisz de Kock =

Dutch Renaissance painter

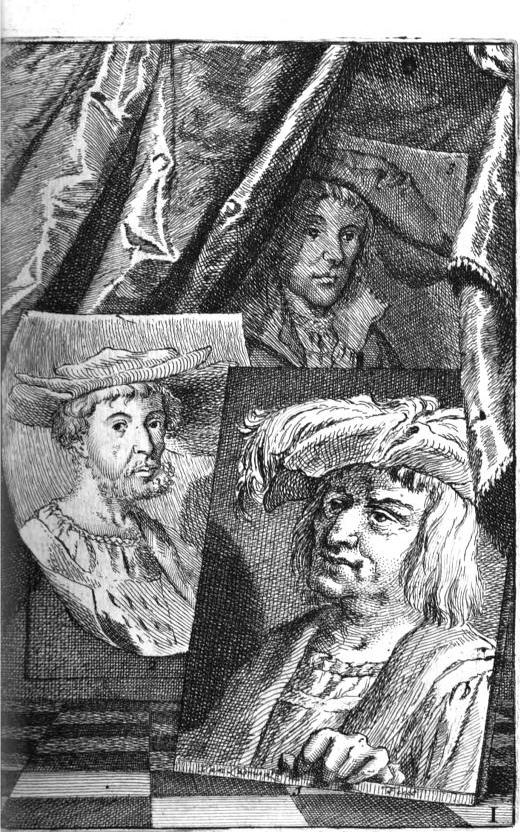
Jan Matsys, Huig Jacobsz & Lucas Cornelisz de Kock

Lucas Cornelisz de Kock or Kunst (1495–1552) was a Dutch Renaissance painter active in the Tudor court.

== Biography ==
De Kock was born and died in Leiden. According to Karel van Mander he was a pupil of his father, the painter Cornelis Engelbrechtsz and like his brothers Cornelis and Pieter, was taught to paint by him in Leiden. The little encouragement the art experienced at that time in his native country, obliged him, for the support of a numerous family, to exercise the occupation of a cook, and eventually induced him to visit England. In the time of Henry VIII of England he left for England with his wife and 7 or 8 children, and nothing more was heard of him, though a painting was brought to Leiden by a merchant named Hans de Hartoogh that seemed to be by his hand. He was made painter to the king. Later when the Earl of Leicester became governor and visited the Netherlands with some other Englishmen, they bought up many of his works to take them back to England, where they were sought after.

According to the RKD he was formerly considered to be the same person as Luca d'Olanda, and is known today for historical allegories, drawings, and glass painting.

Van Mander mentions some of the works of this master at Leyden, among others, the 'Adulteress before Christ.' Of his works in England, the sixteen portraits of the Constables of Queenborough Castle, at Penshurst, are the most considerable; and though few of them can be original paintings, they possess great merit. At Hampton Court there are four small female portraits, probably copies, attributed to him.

Today some works of that are considered stylistically similar to works by Jan Wellens de Cock hang in the Museum "Societeit" in Tiel.

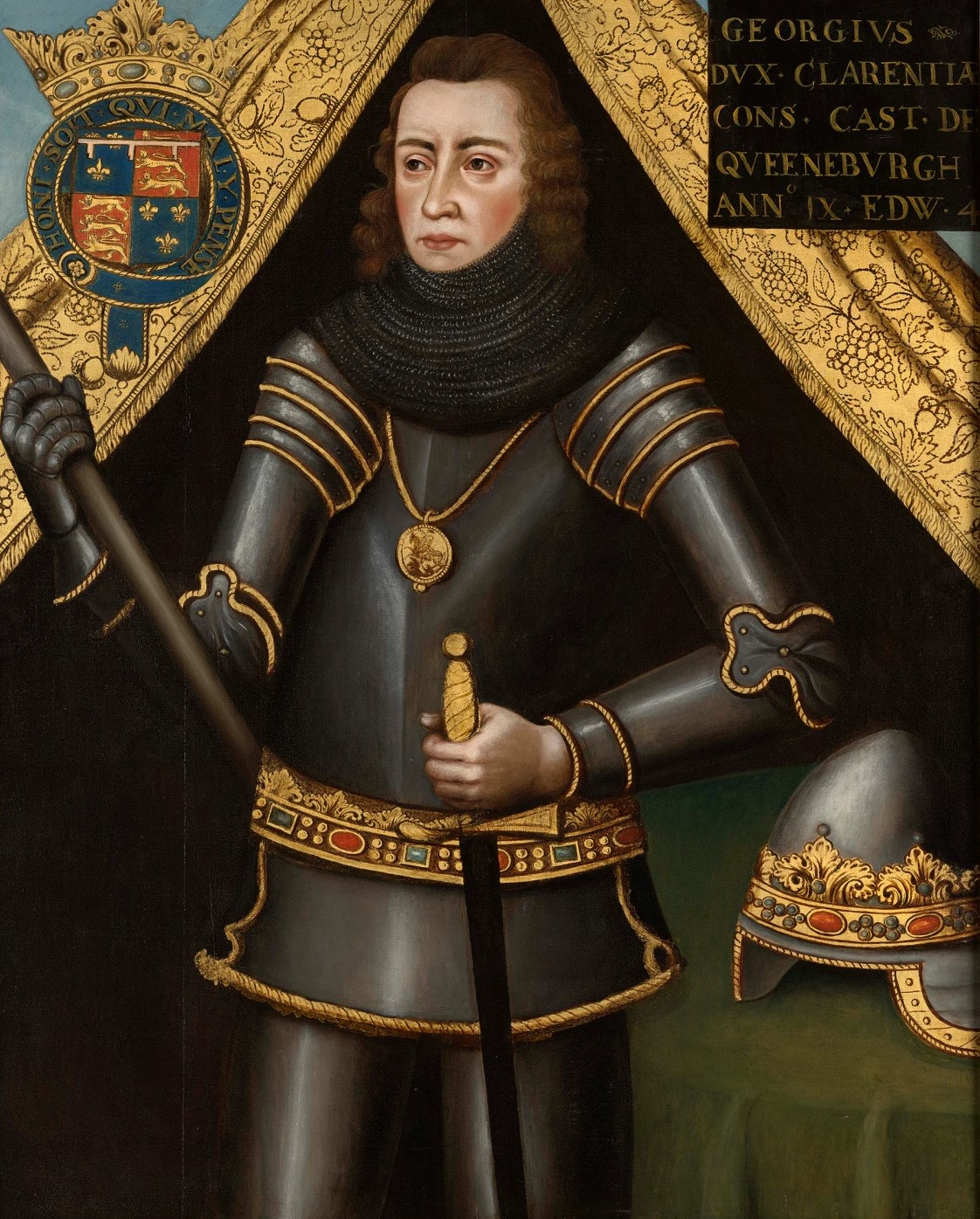
George Plantagenet, Duke of Clarence

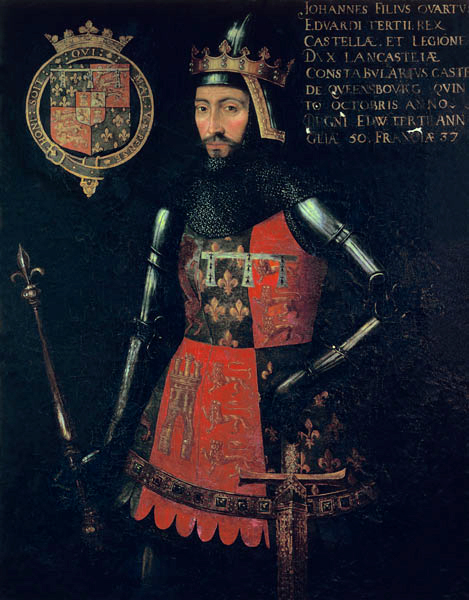
John of Gaunt, Duke of Lancaster
