= Fritz Kunst =

German politician

Mayor of Jena
- In office 1953–1960
- Preceded by: Hans Meier
- Succeeded by: Heinz Wessel

Mayor of Greiz
- In office 1948–1953

Personal details
- Born: November 12, 1899; Greiz, German Empire
- Died: October 13, 1979 (aged 79); Jena, German Democratic Republic
- Political party: Socialist Unity Party of Germany (1946-); Communist Party of Germany (-1946)
- Awards: Patriotic Order of Merit, in Silver (1975); Banner of Labor (1959)

Fritz Kunst (12 November 1899–October 13, 1979) was a German politician of the Communist Party and SED, and mayor of Greiz and Jena.

== Life ==
Born in Greiz, Kunst was a member of the Communist Party (KPD) at its founding in 1918 and was a leader in the labour sport movement (Arbeiter-Turn- und -Sportbewegung). During the Third Reich he was active in the Communist resistance and was arrested several times and tortured by the Gestapo. After the end of the war, within the Soviet Occupation Zone, he became a local leader (Kreisleiter) for the KPD (and from 1946, SED). In 1948, he was elected mayor of his hometown Greiz with the support of the Soviet commandant. From 1953 to 1960, he was mayor of the city of Jena.

== Honours ==
- On 12 November 1969, the city of Jena conferred honorary citizenship upon Kunst. This was rescinded on 20 March 1991.
- The city of Jena also named a street after Kunst, which has since been renamed to Schrödingerstraße.

== Links ==
- Fritz Kunst in 1945 on the balcony of the Greiz city hall
