= Pieter Cornelisz Kunst =

Dutch Renaissance painter

Pieter Cornelisz Kunst (1484–1490, Leiden – 1560–1561, Leiden), was a Dutch Renaissance painter.

== Biography ==
Kunst was one of the three sons of the painter Cornelis Engebrechtsz who became a painter and glass painter (engraver). His brothers Cornelis Cornelisz Kunst and Lucas Cornelisz de Kock were also painters. He is known for historical allegories, drawings, and glass painting. In 1509 he married Marijtgen Gerritsdr van Dam, with whom he had a son Adriaen Pietersz who became a glass engraver, and a daughter Marijtgen.

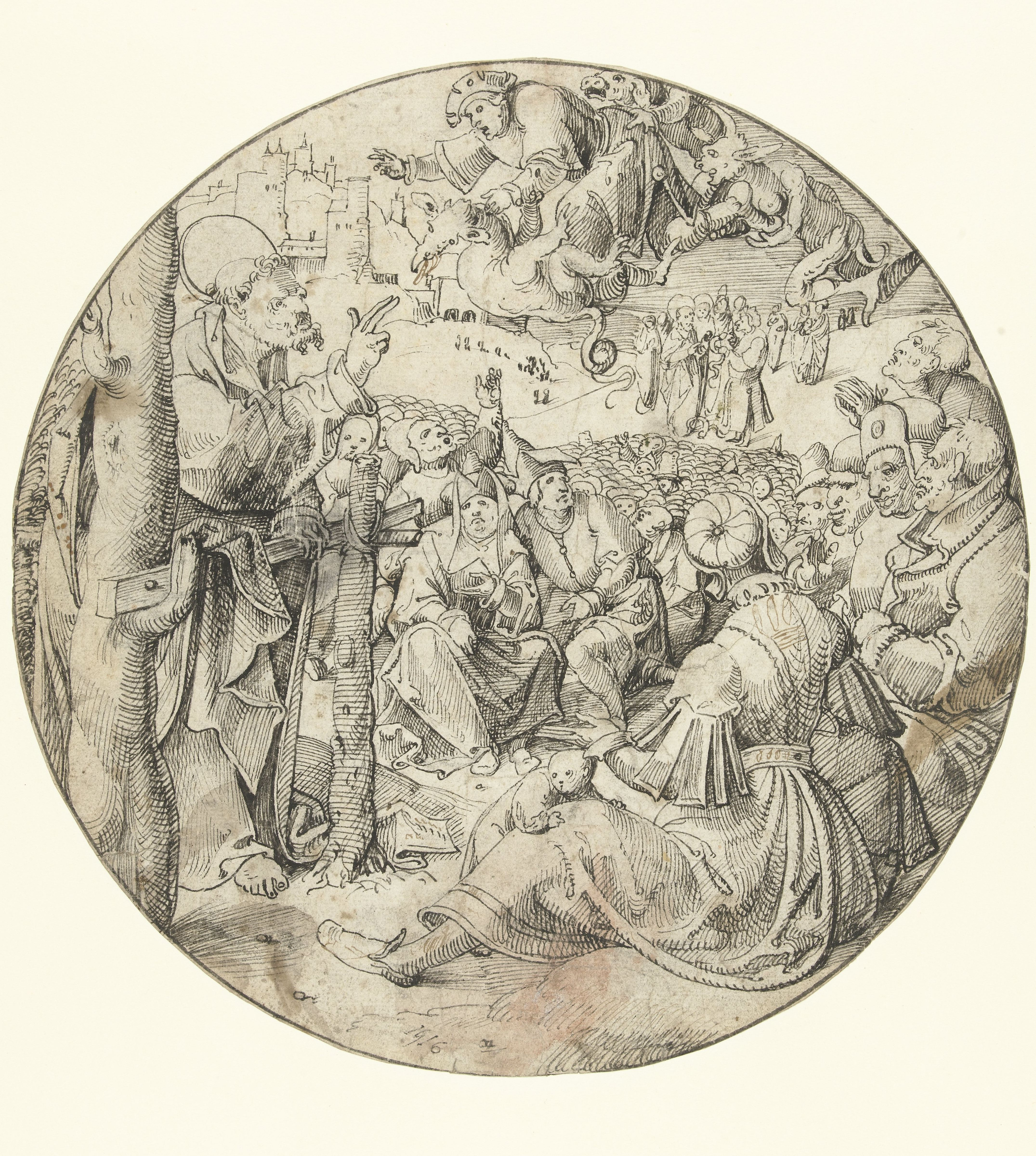

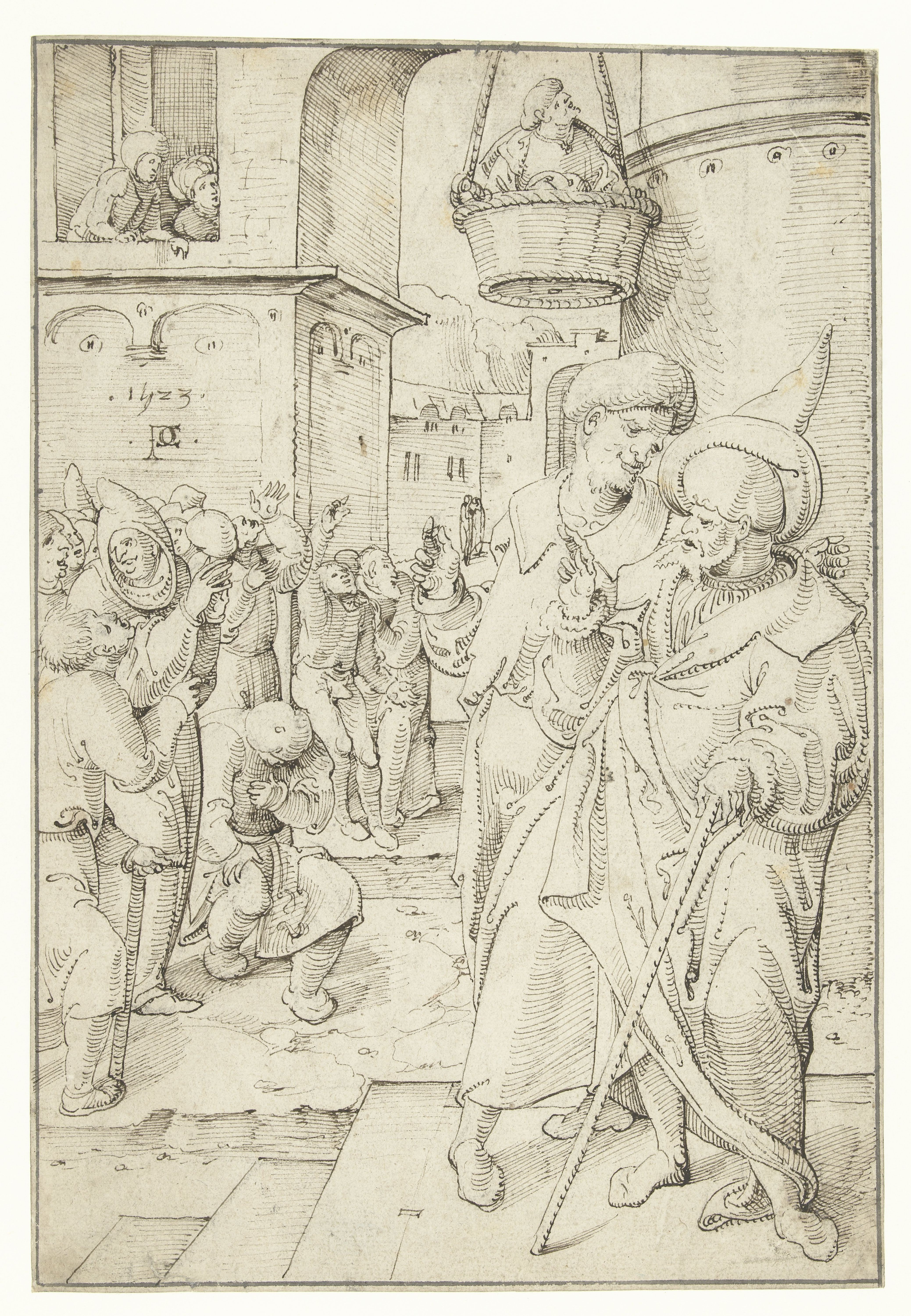

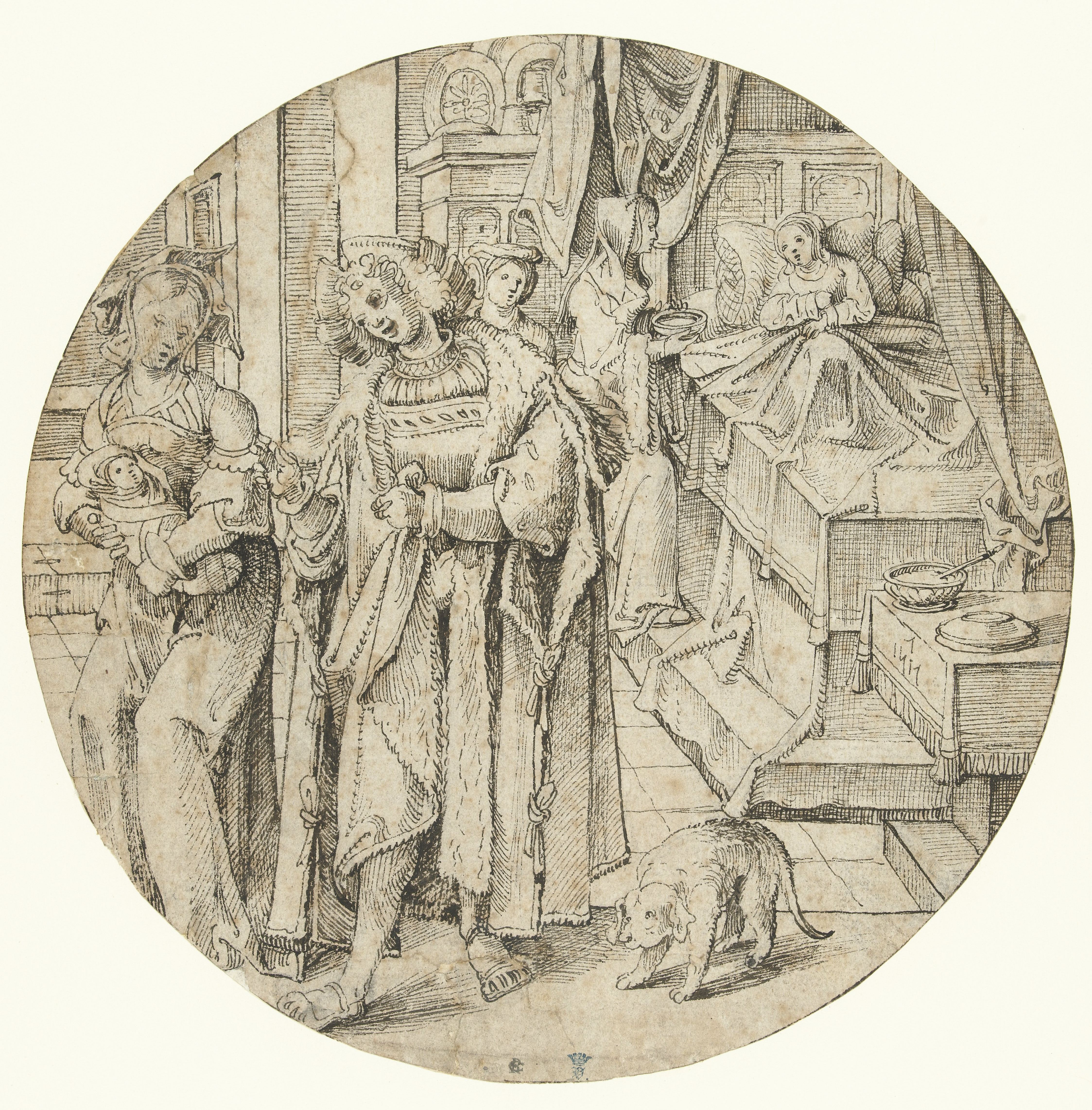
