= Lucas van Leyden =

Dutch painter (1494–1534)

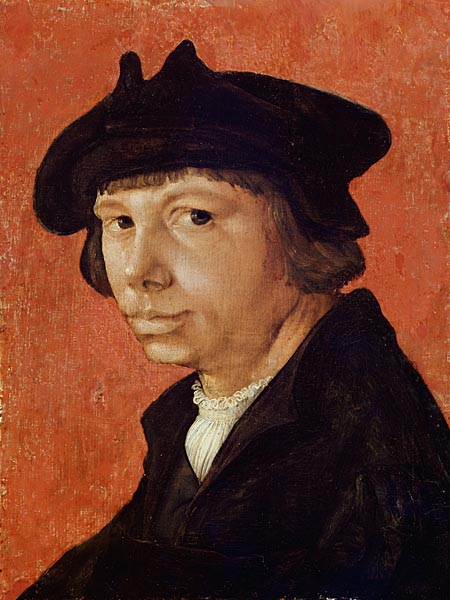
- Self portrait of Lucas van Leyden (1525–26)
- Born: May 1494
- Died: 1533, May 1533 (aged 38–39)
- Occupation: Painter, visual artist

Lucas van Leyden (1494 – 8 August 1533), (Note: Also named either Lucas Hugensz or Lucas Jacobsz) was a Dutch painter and printmaker in engraving and woodcut. Lucas van Leyden was among the first Dutch exponents of genre painting and was a very accomplished engraver.

== Biography ==
Lucas was the son of the painter Huygh Jacobsz. He was born, died, and was mainly active in Leiden.

Karel van Mander characterises Lucas as a tireless artist, who as a child annoyed his mother by working long hours after nightfall, which she forbade not only for the cost of candlelight, but also because she felt that too much study was bad for his sensibilities. According to Van Mander, as a boy he only consorted with other young artists, such as painters, glass-etchers and goldsmiths, and was paid by the Heer van Lochorst (Johan van Lockhorst of Leiden, who died in 1510) a golden florin for each of his years at age 12 for a watercolour of St. Hubert.

=== Family ===
In 1515, Lucas married Elisabeth van Boschhuysen, from a patrician Leiden family. The marriage remained childless. Lucas did have a daughter Marijtje, born in Leiden out of wedlock around 1512. This daughter Marijtje would later marry the painter Dammas Claesz de Hoij. In their offspring, the De Hoij family, one can find prominent artists throughout the sixteenth and seventeenth centuries.

== Paintings ==
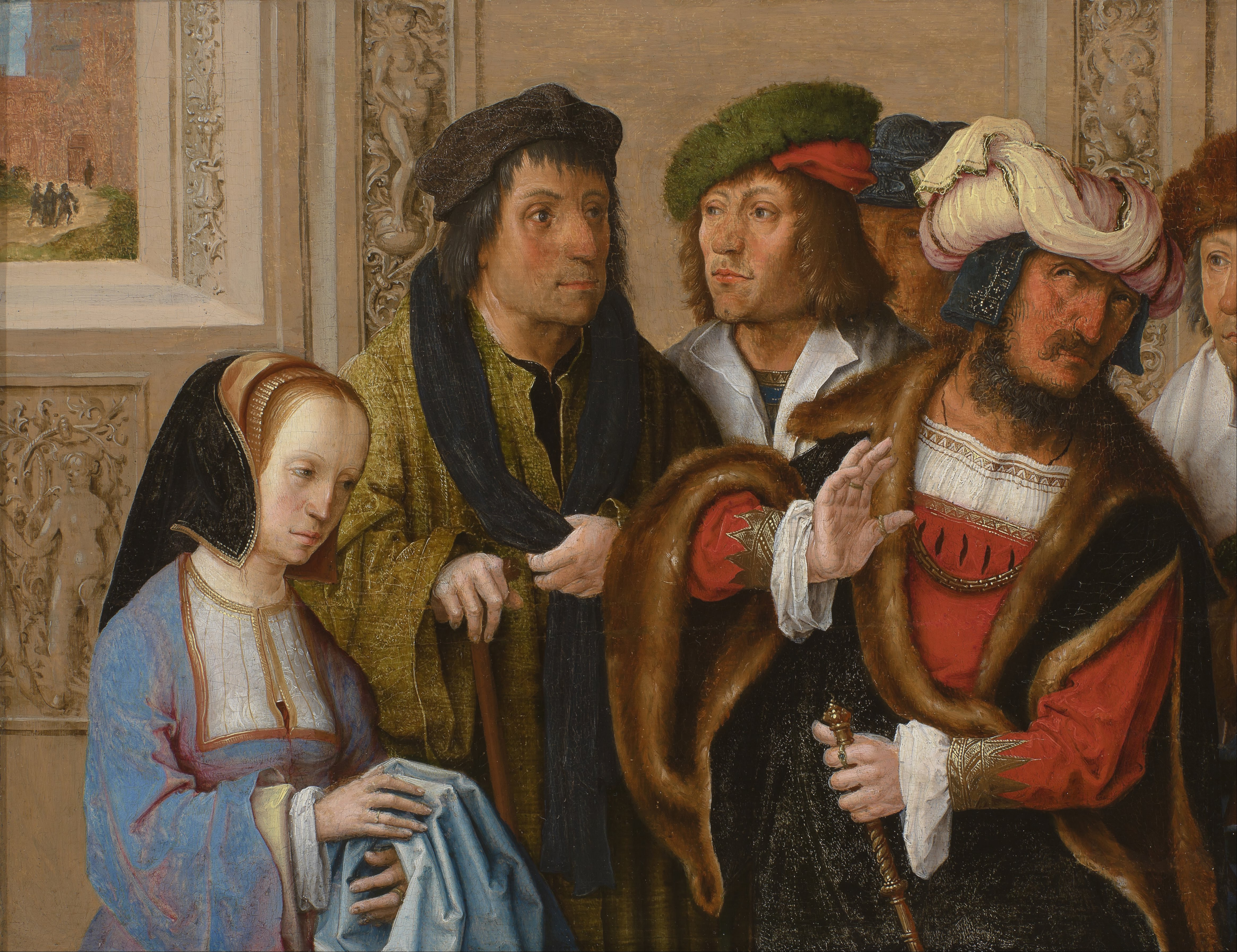
Potiphars Wife Displays Joseph's Garment

He learned basic techniques from his father (Note: Smith 1992, p. 279 identifies Huygh Jacobsz with the pseudonymous Master of the St John Panels.) and from Cornelis Engelbrechtsz, but his precocious originality was paramount. Where he learnt engraving is unknown, but he took advantage of the works of Marcantonio Raimondi, whose motifs are reworked in Lucas' engravings and paintings, and became highly skilled in that art at a very early age: the earliest known print by him (Mohammed and the Murdered Monk) dates from 1508, when he was perhaps only 14, yet reveals no trace of immaturity in inspiration or technique.

Seventeen paintings surely by Lucas survive, and a further twenty-seven are known from descriptions by Karel van Mander, from contemporary copies or from drawings of them made by Jan de Bisschop in the later 17th century. Max Friedländer described no clear pattern of stylistic development, in large part because Lucas' oeuvre was swelled and obscured by attributions since found unsustainable.

Four broad stages in his artistic development are characterised by Elise Lawton Smith as his early half-length figures (c 1506–1512), the development of his landscapes (c 1512–1520), the influence of Antwerp paintings (c 1521–25) and the late works (ca 1525–1531), where multiple figures are deployed against wooded landscapes, as in the Healing of blind man of Jericho.

Raimondi's studies of nudes inspired van Leyden in his later work, particularly his altarpieces, in which he is an early Dutch adopter of the Italian-style nude figure. Two further artistic influences were Albrecht Dürer and Jan Gossaert. Indeed, he was friends with both, and Dürer drew van Leyden's portrait when they met in 1521. Dürer's mastery of engraving and Gossaert's Romanist style both heavily influenced van Leyden's work.

== Prints ==
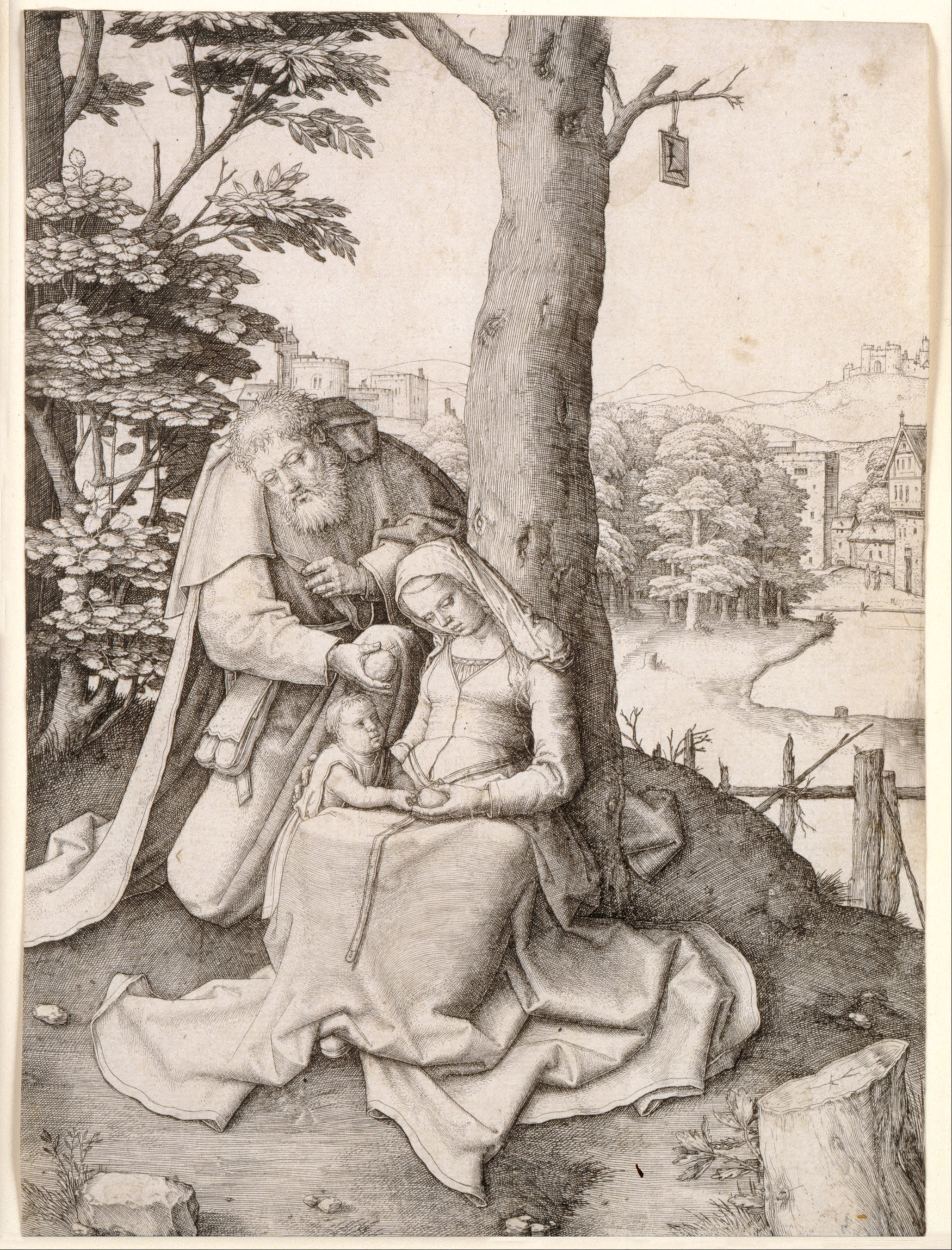
The Holy Family

Lucas's print included secular subjects, and many depictions of famous Biblical scenes, including Adoration of the Magi, The Virgin and Child on the Crescent, and The Holy Family.

=== The Power of Women Series ===
From 1513 to 1517, Lucas created a series of woodcuts called "The Power of Women", which consisted of two large and small sets of prints. The series is one of a number of representations of the Power of Women theme, which was extremely popular in Renaissance art and literature. Artworks in the genre depict the traditional roles of men and women in inverse, with women dominating over men in various situations. The subjects illustrated often consist of legendary historical women who were considered to be virtuous heroines as well as women who were considered cunning, seductive, and manipulative of men. The purpose of the "Power of Women" theme was to demonstrate that even the strongest and wisest of men were not resistant to the sexuality of women.

==== Large Power of Women (1513—) ====
The Mouth of Truth: A woman kneels in front of the Emperor of Rome and places her hand in the mouth of a statue of a lion while a crowd observes in the background.

The Fall of Man: In the foreground, Eve stands to the left of the tree of knowledge of good and evil, around which a serpent is wrapped, and hands an apple to Adam, who sits to the right of the tree. In the background to the right, an angel drives Adam and Eve out of Eden.

Samson and Delilah: Delilah sits a bed of rocks while Samson lies sleeping in her lap. She holds his hair in one hand and cuts it with a knife.

Solomon's Idolatry: King Solomon kneels in front of an idol of Moloch in the centre foreground while one of his mistresses and a crowd of men observe him from behind.

Herod and Herodias: Herod and Herodias sit at a table while their daughter Salome approaches them, holding a plate bearing the head of St. John the Baptist.

The Poet Virgil Suspended in a Basket: Virgil is shown stranded in a basket hung on the side of a tower in the town square, with a jeering crowd below him.

==== Small Power of Women (1517—) ====
The Fall of Man: In the foreground, Adam and Eve are around the tree of knowledge of good and evil, with the serpent wrapped around the trunk and holding an apple. In the background, an angel drives Adam and Eve out of paradise.

Jael Killing Sisera: In the foreground, Jael hammers a tent peg into Sisera's ear as he lies on the ground. In the middle ground on the right, Jael points out the foreground scene to a group of armed Israelites. In the background on the left, Sisera drinks from a goblet given to him by Jael.

Samson and Delilah: Same as woodcut of larger size. Delilah sits a bed of rocks while Samson lies sleeping in her lap. She holds his hair in one hand and cuts it with a knife.

Solomon's Idolatry: Same as woodcut of larger size. King Solomon kneels in front of an idol of Moloch in the centre foreground while one of his mistresses and a crowd of men observe him from behind.

Jezebel Promising Naboth's Vineyards to King Ahab: Jezebel stands beside her husband King Ahab of Israel, who is lying on his bed in his room.

Herod and Herodias: In the foreground, Salome holds a plate bearing the head of St. John the Baptist in front of Herod and Herodias, who are sitting at a table. Through a window on the back wall, St. John the Baptist is seen being beheaded.

== Collections ==
Today, Lucas's work is held in the permanent collections of several institutions worldwide, including the Metropolitan Museum of Art, the Museum of Fine Arts, Boston, the British Museum, the Princeton University Art Museum, the Museum Boijmans Van Beuningen, the Philadelphia Museum of Art, the Fralin Museum of Art, the Brooklyn Museum, the Ashmolean Museum, the Detroit Institute of Arts, the Museum of New Zealand Te Papa Tongarewa, the Worcester Art Museum, the Clark Art Institute, the University of Michigan Museum of Art, and the Thyssen-Bornemisza Museum.

== Gallery ==
Paintings

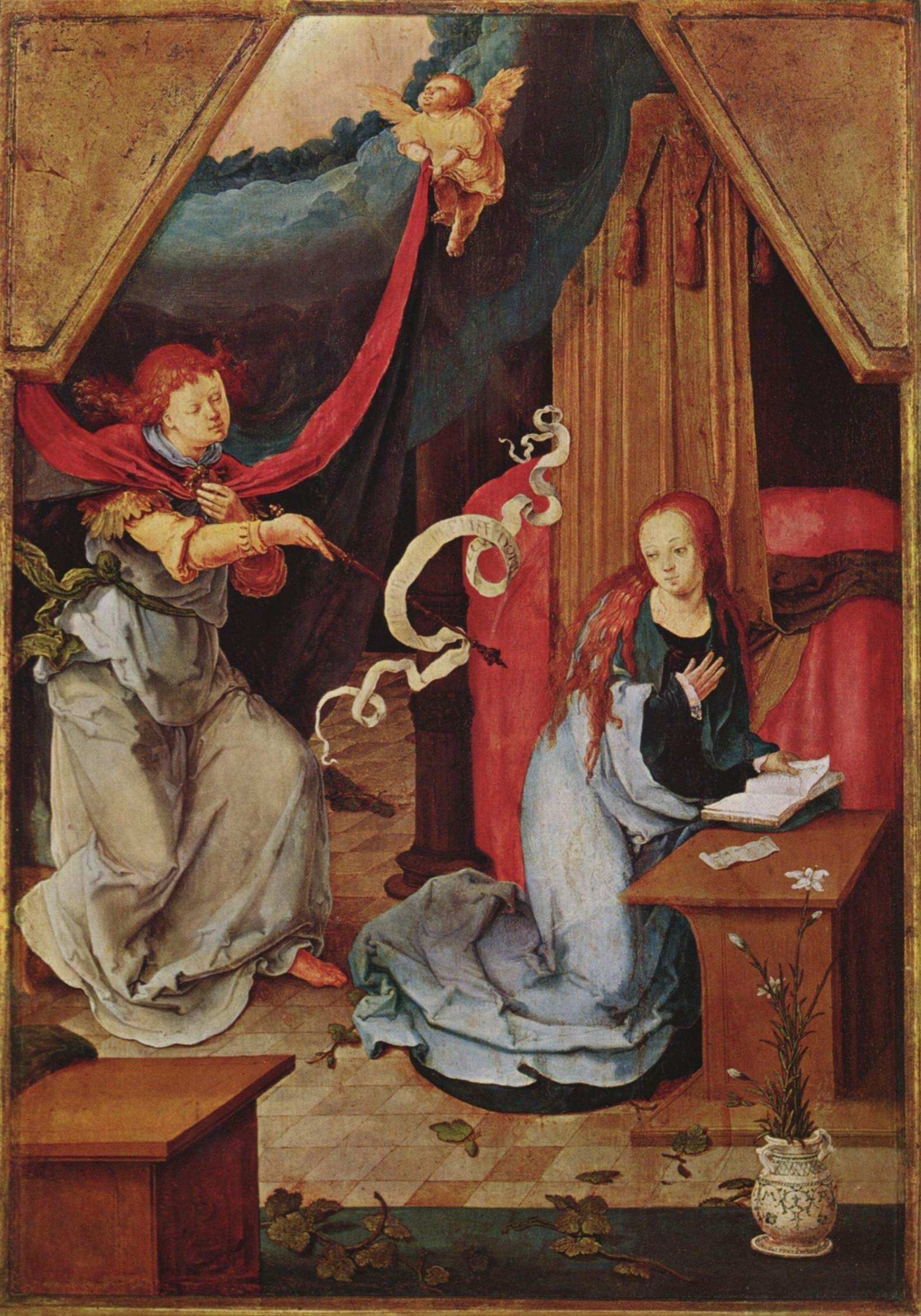
Annunciation, 1522

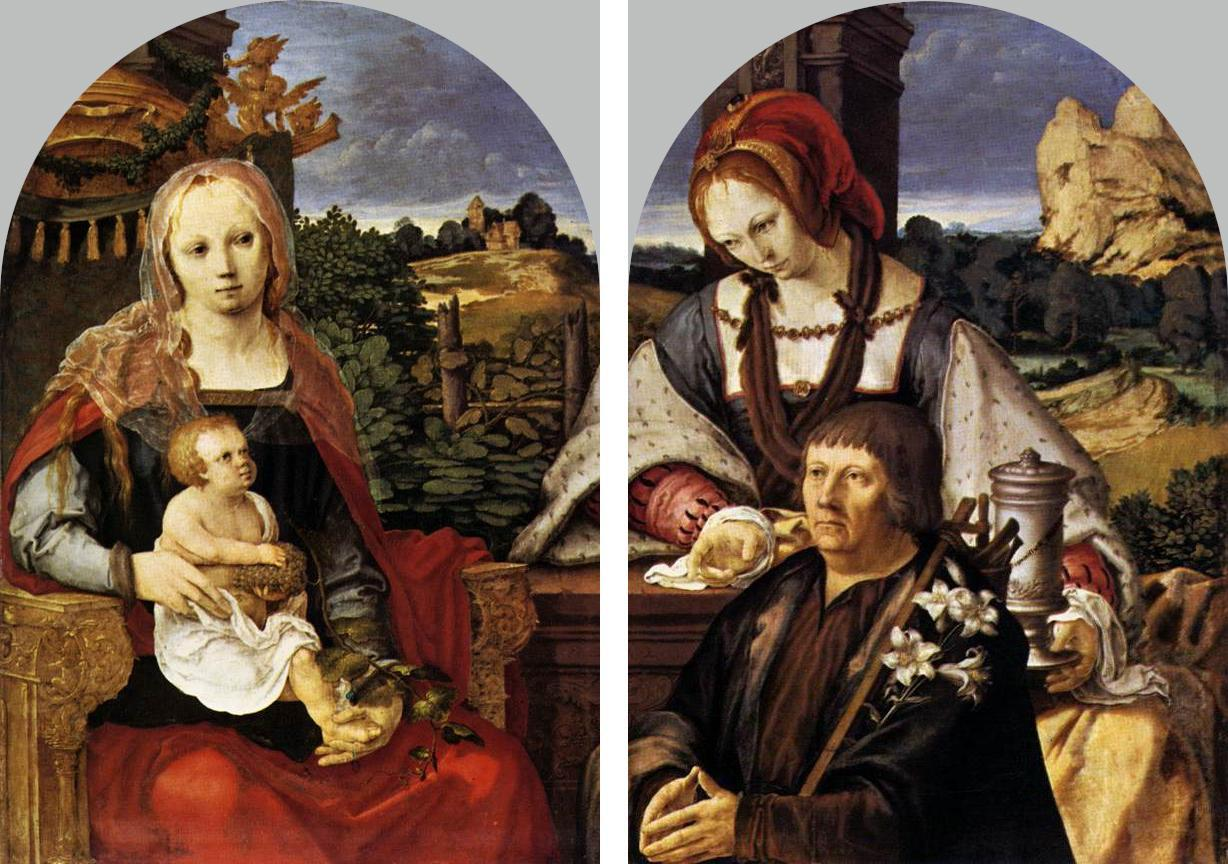
Virgin and Child with Mary Magdalen and a donor, 1522

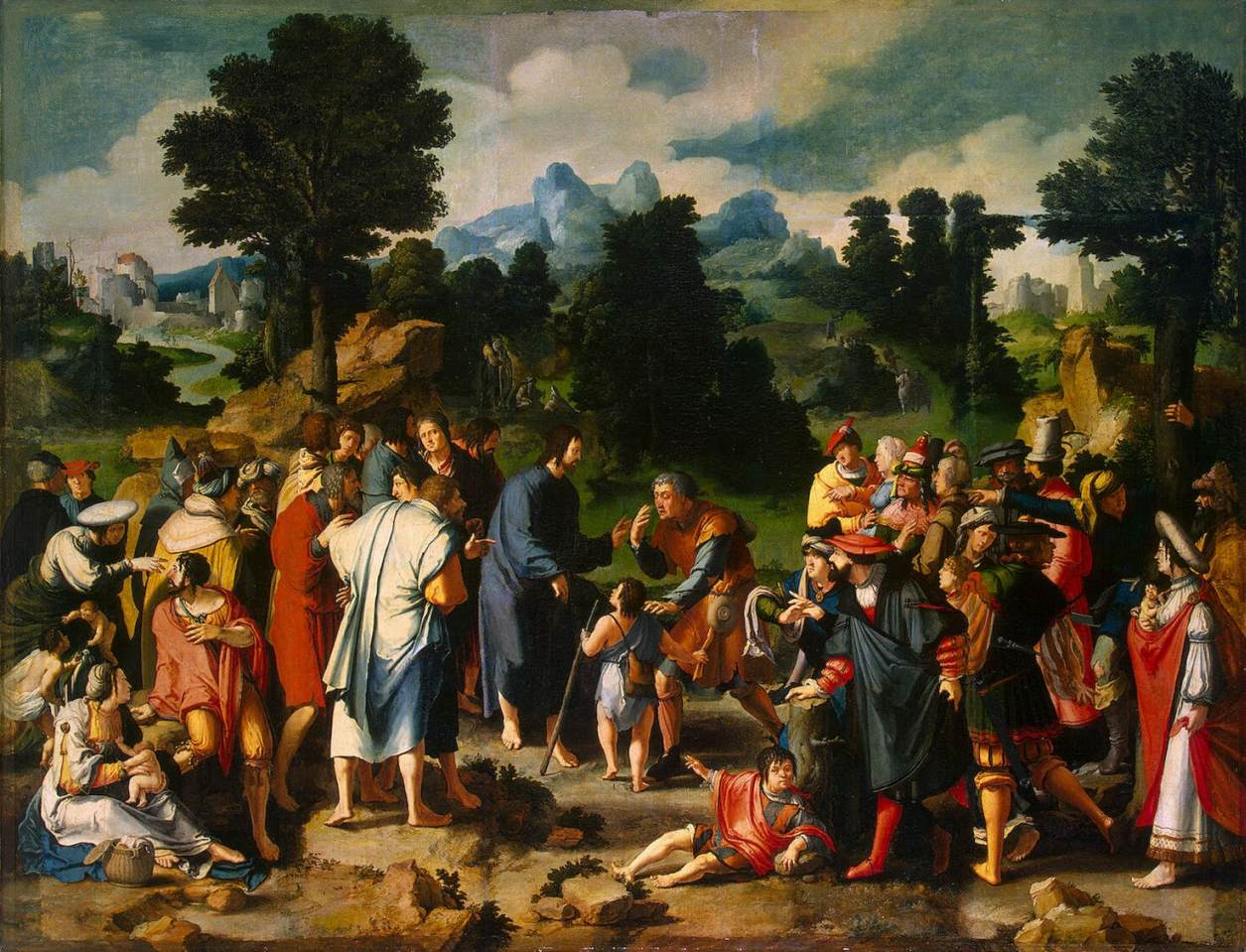
Healing of blind man of Jericho, triptych transferred to single canvas, 1531

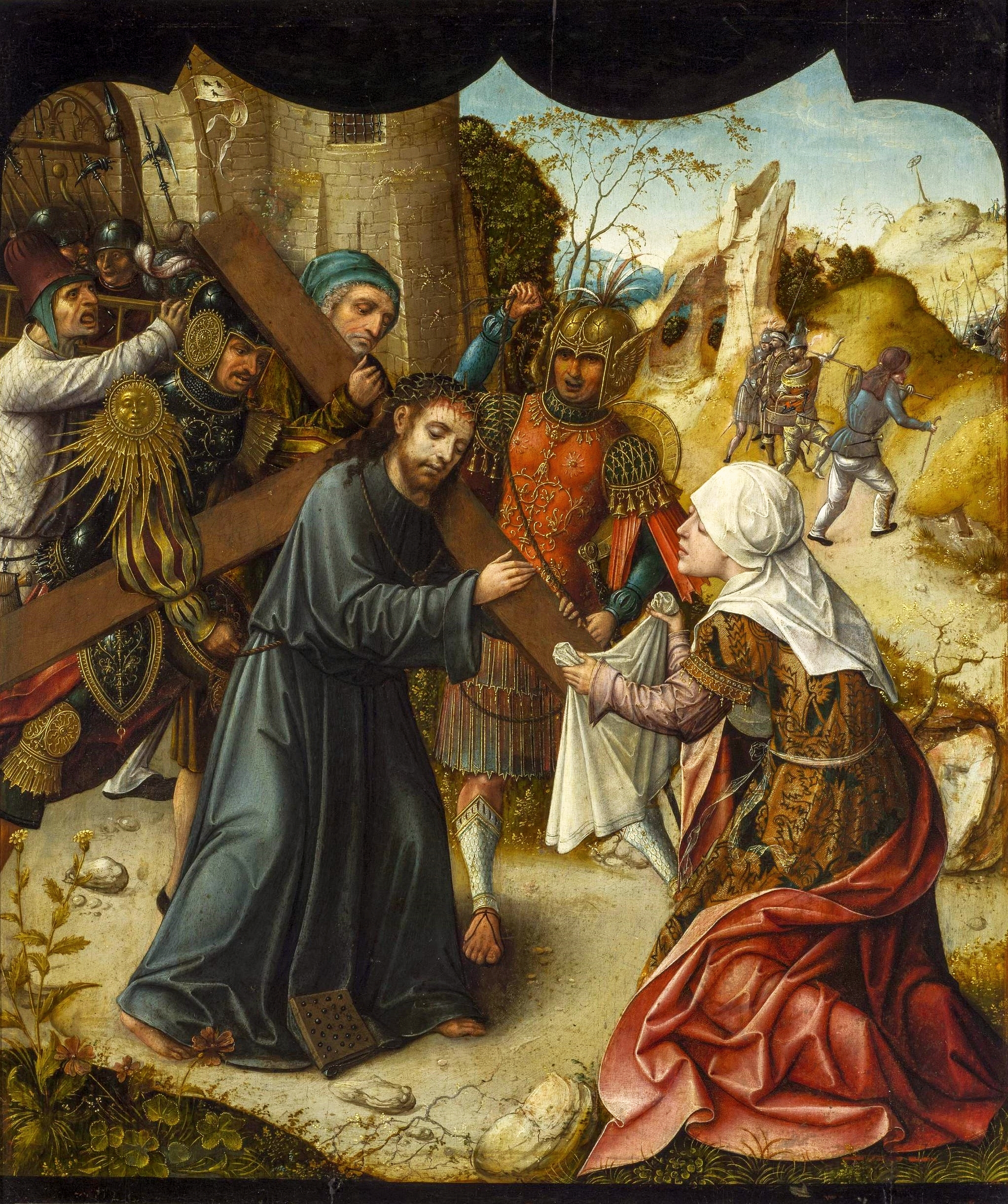
Bearing of the Cross with Veronica, 1520s

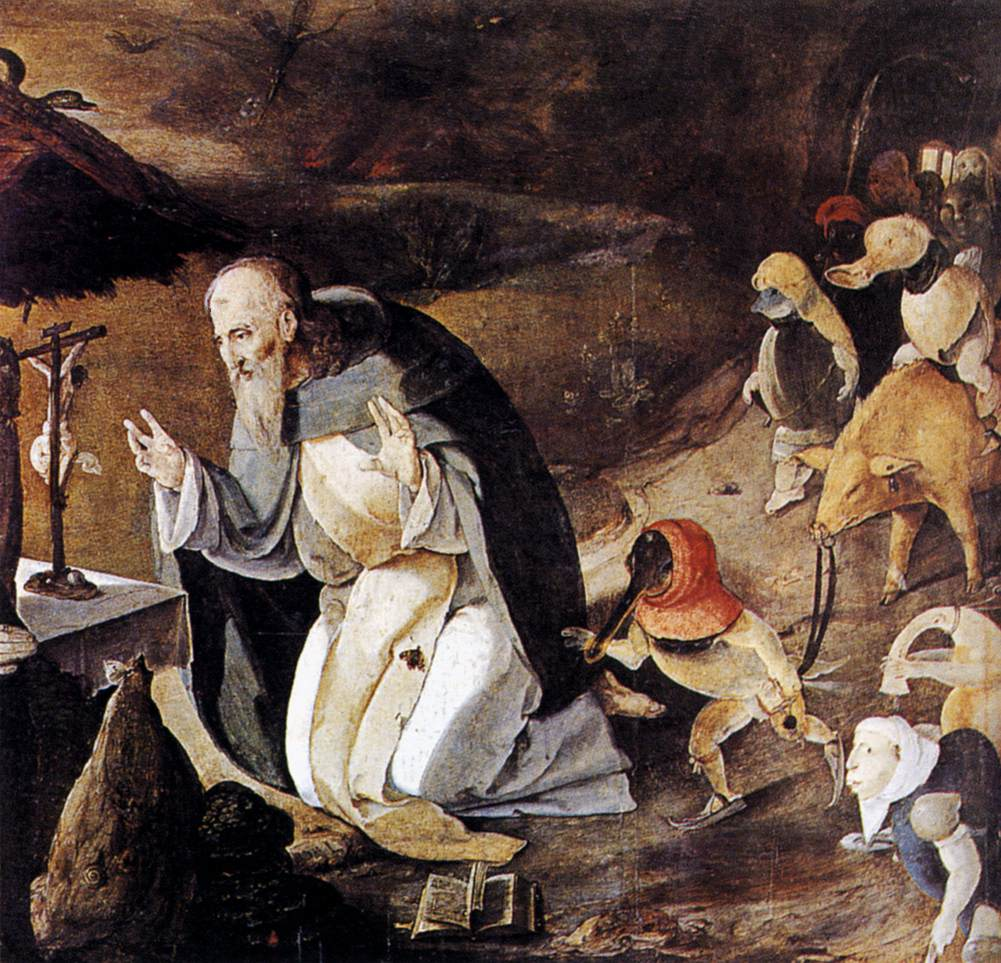
The Temptation of St Anthony

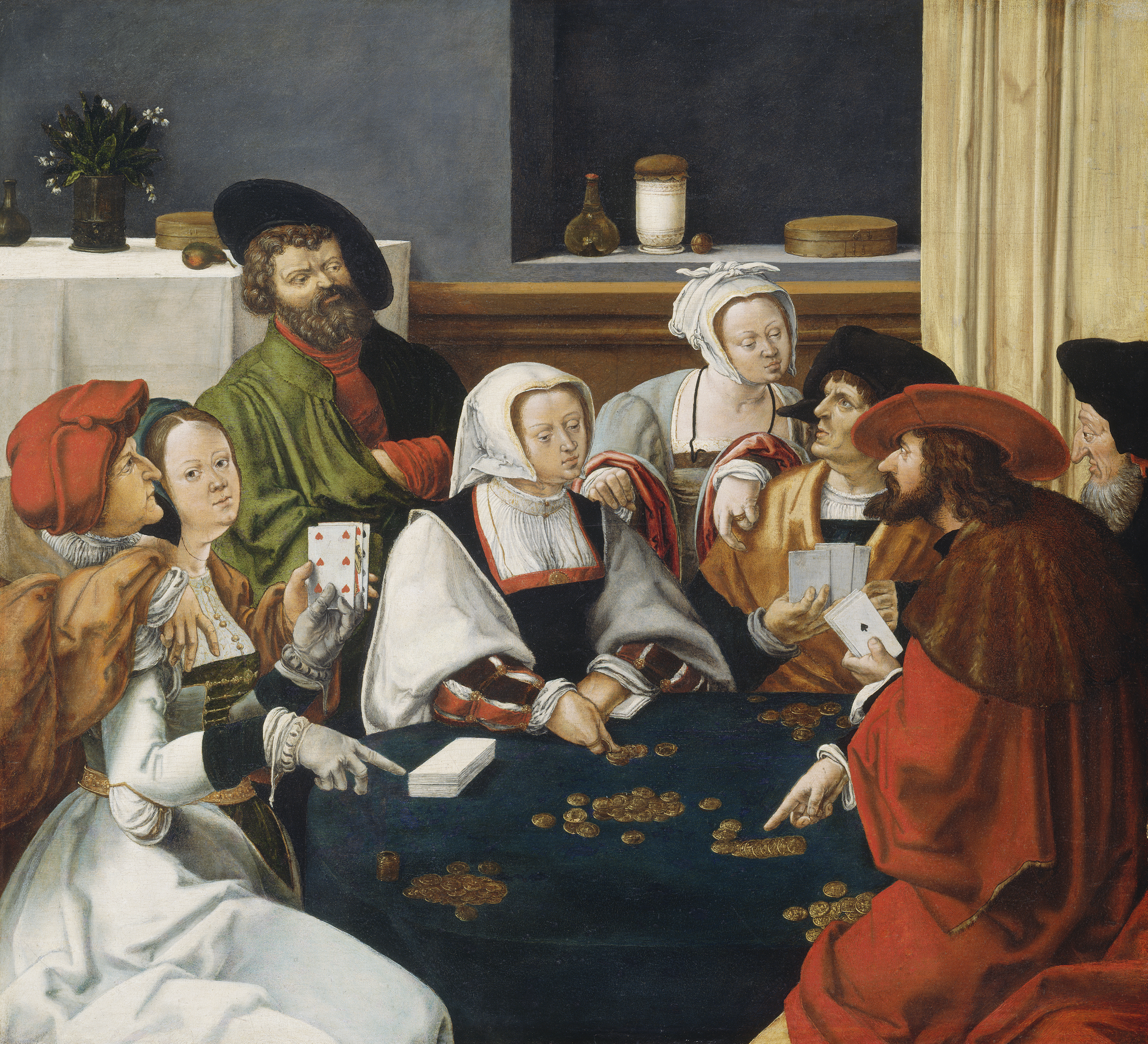
Card Players

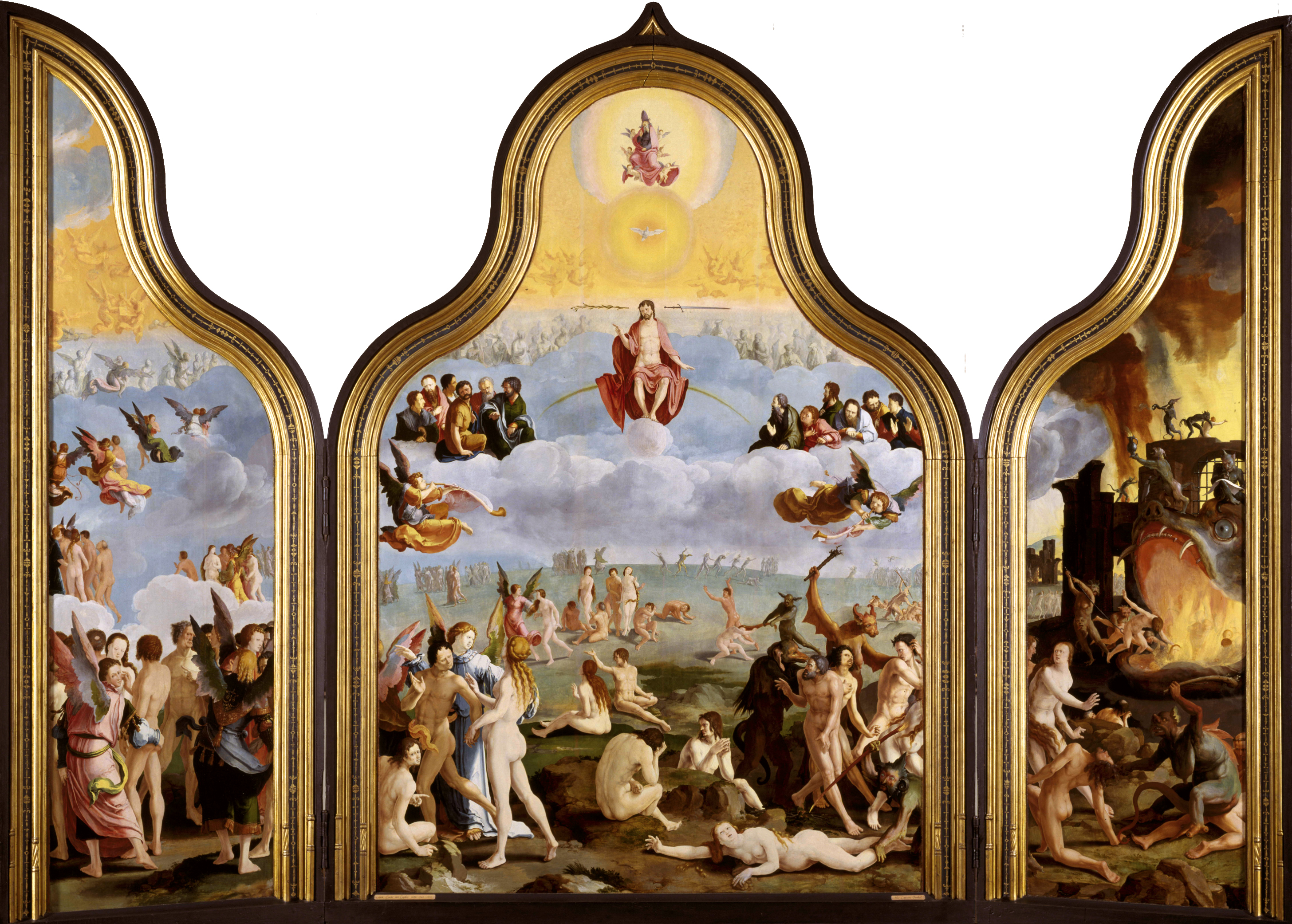
The Last Judgement

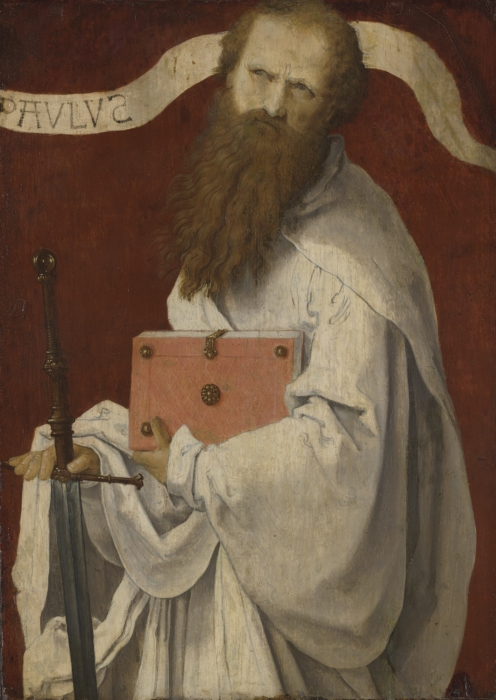
Saint Paul, attr. Leyden

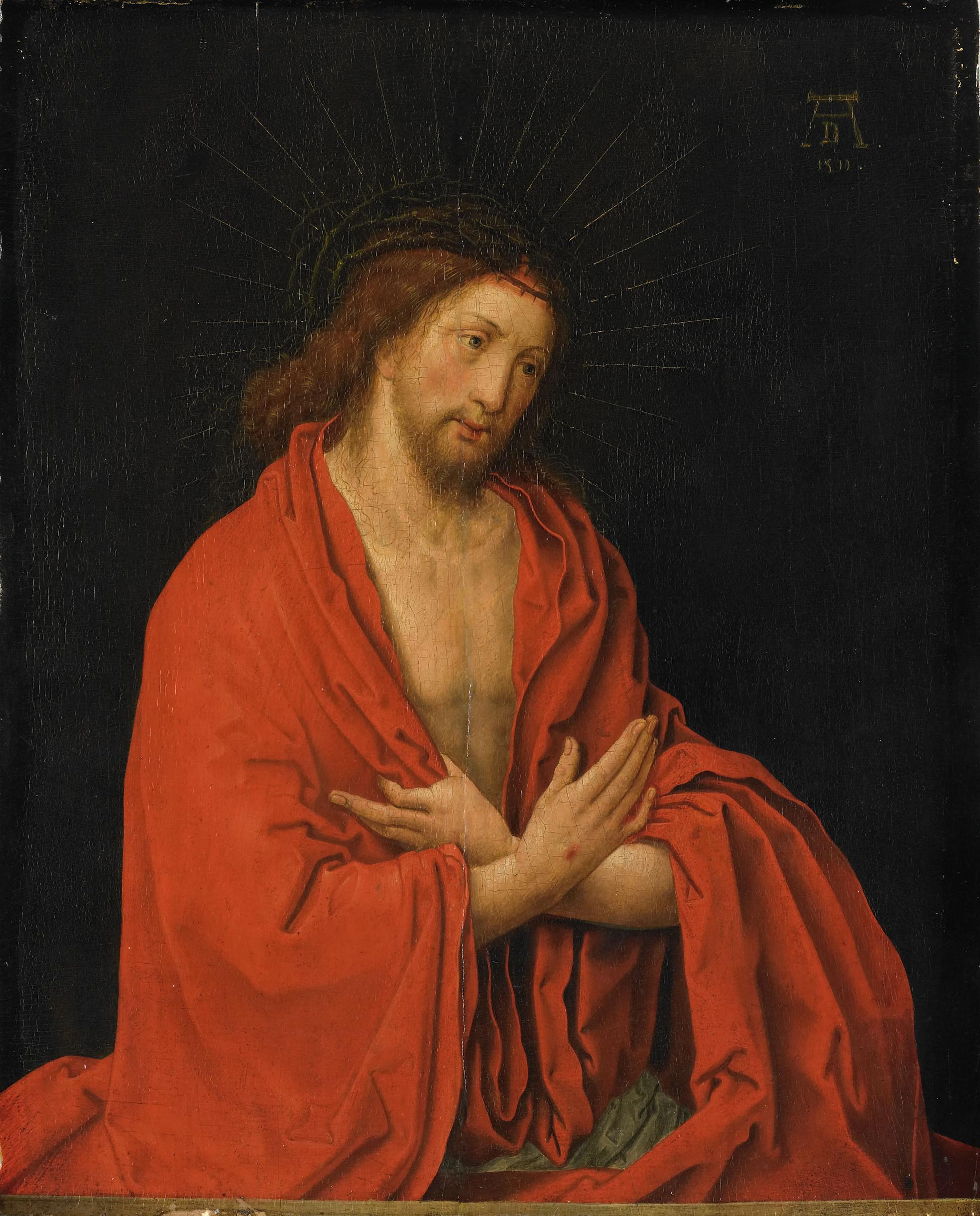
Christ with Crown of Thorns, Lost work, After Lucas van Leyden

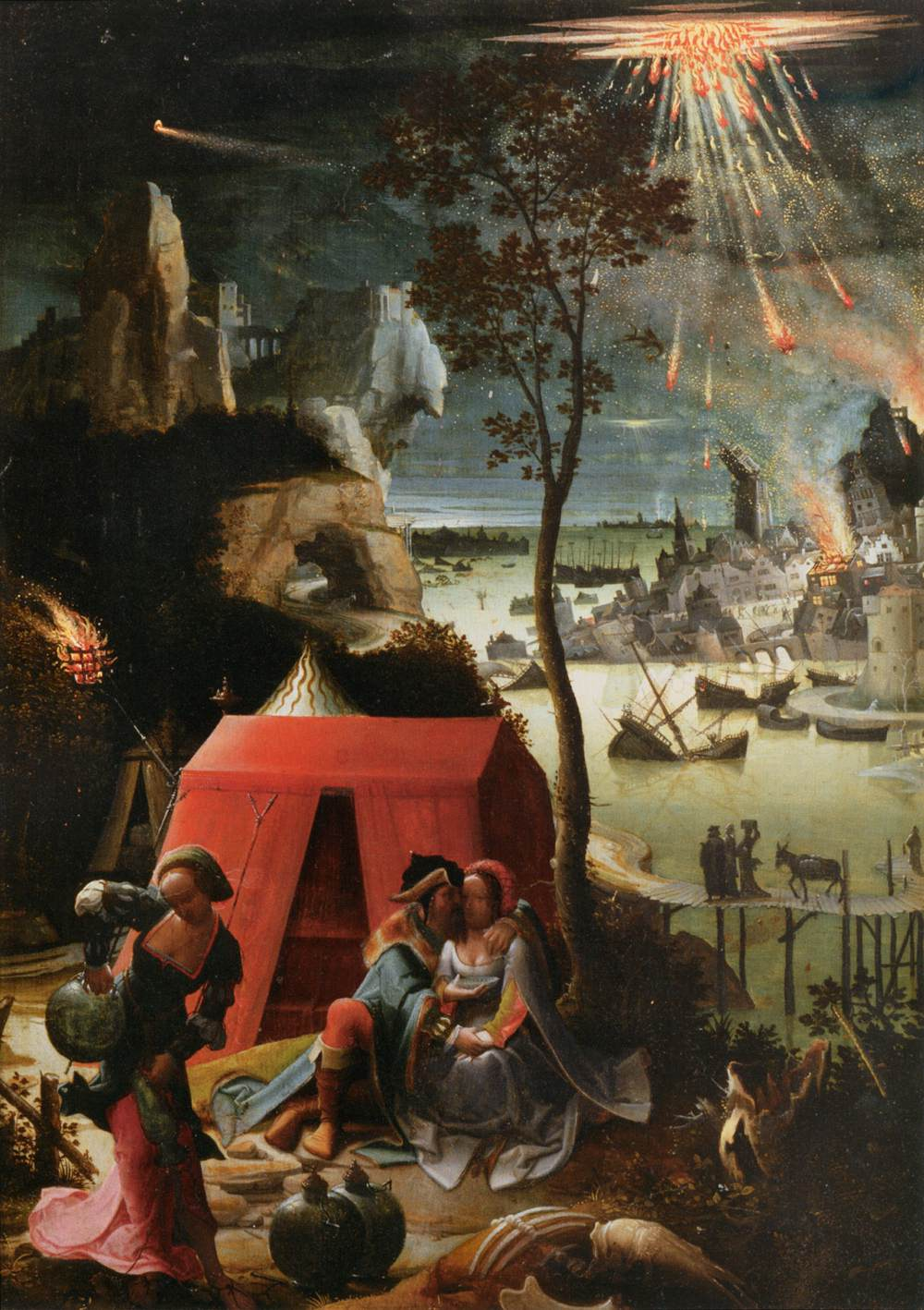
Lot and his Daughters, now anonymous but previously attributed to van Leyden.
Engravings

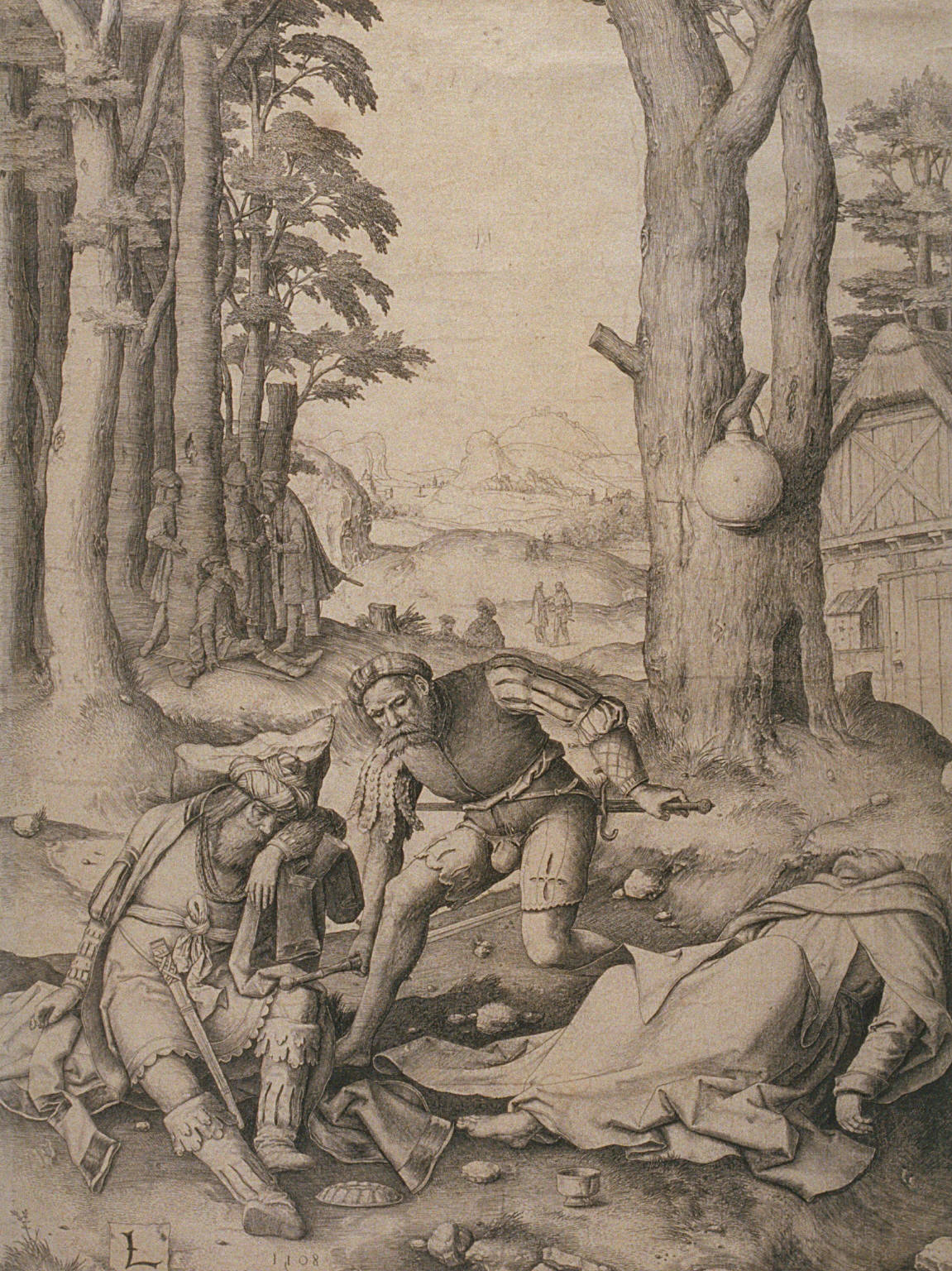
Mohammed and the Murdered Monk, 1508

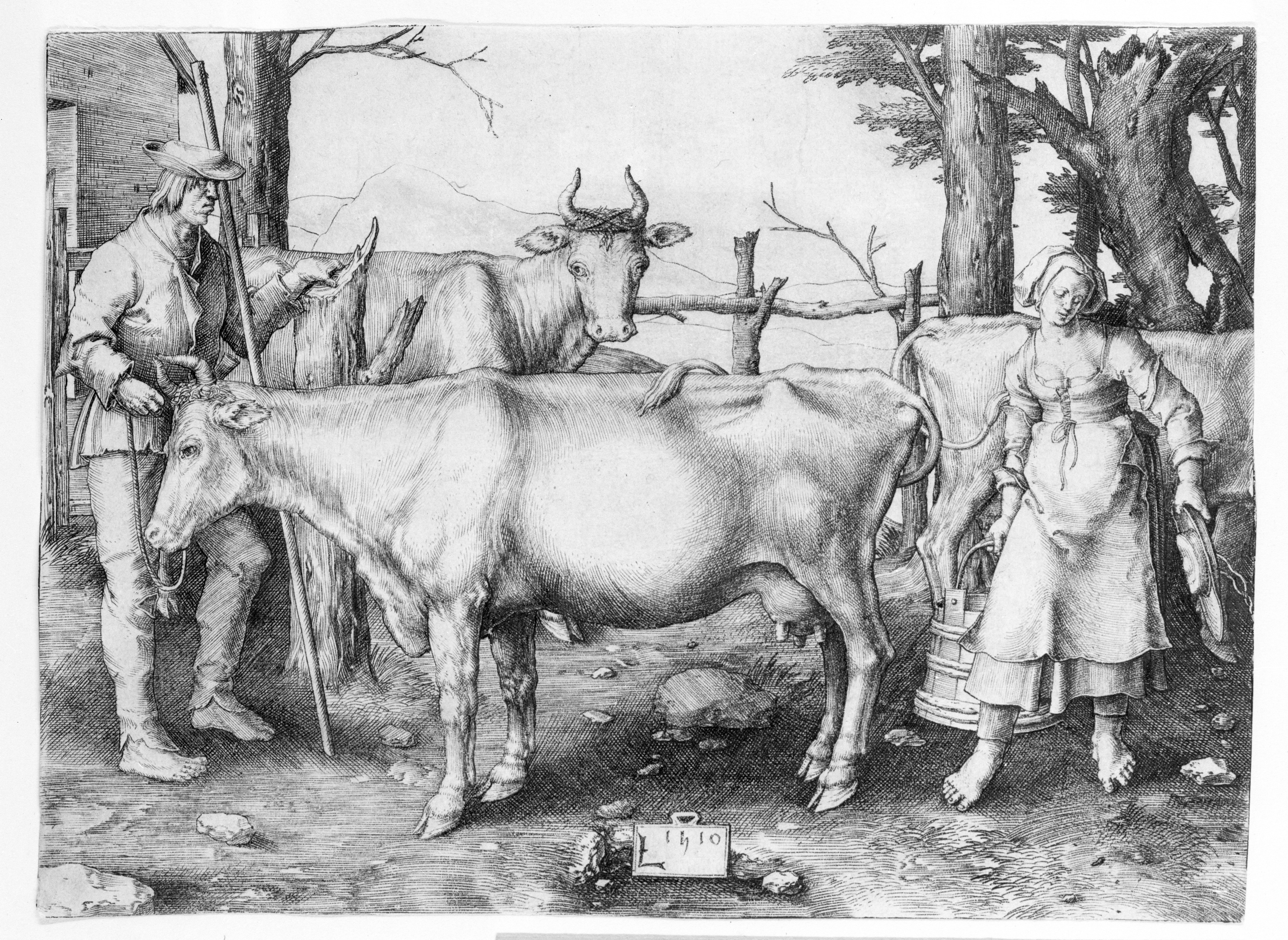
The Milkmaid, 1510

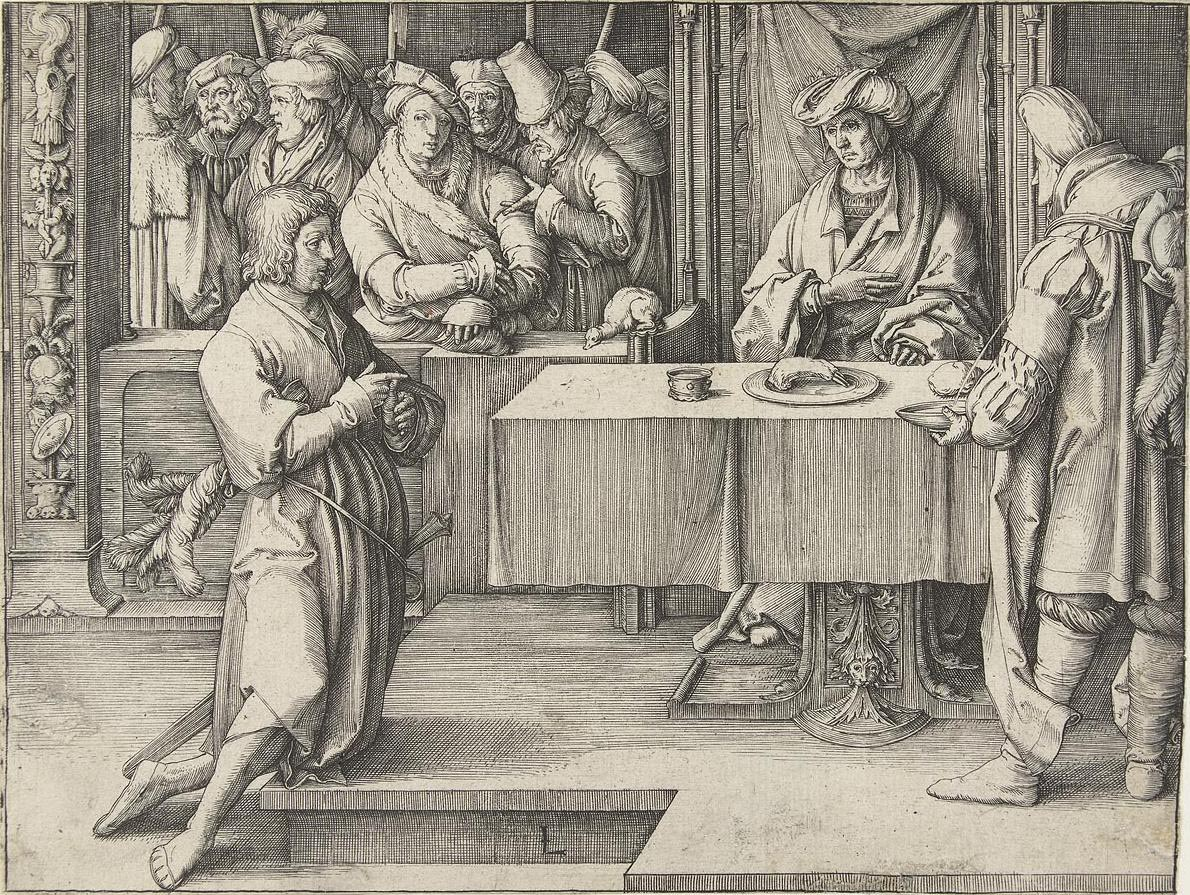
Joseph Explains Pharaoh's Dream, 1512

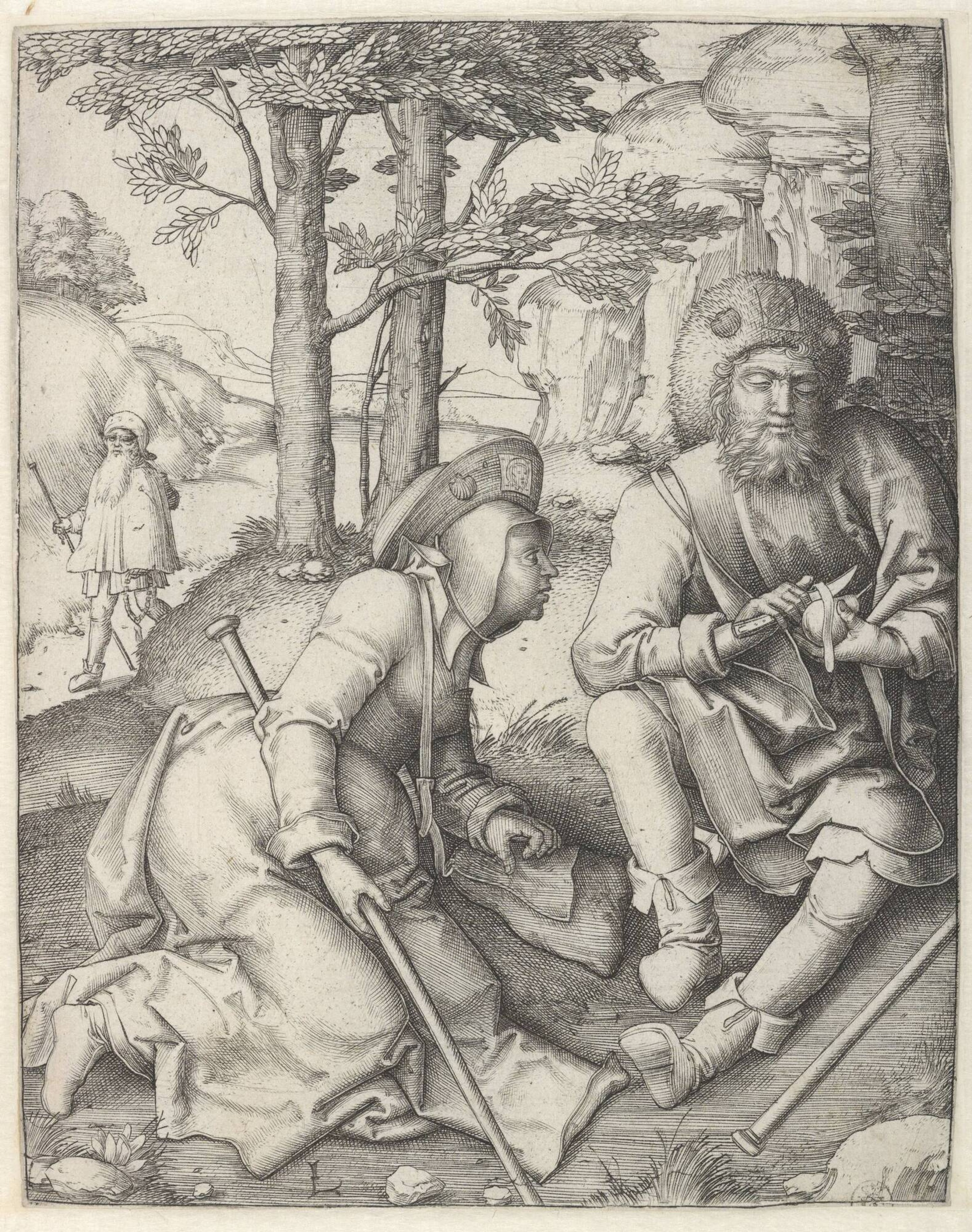
Resting Pilgrims

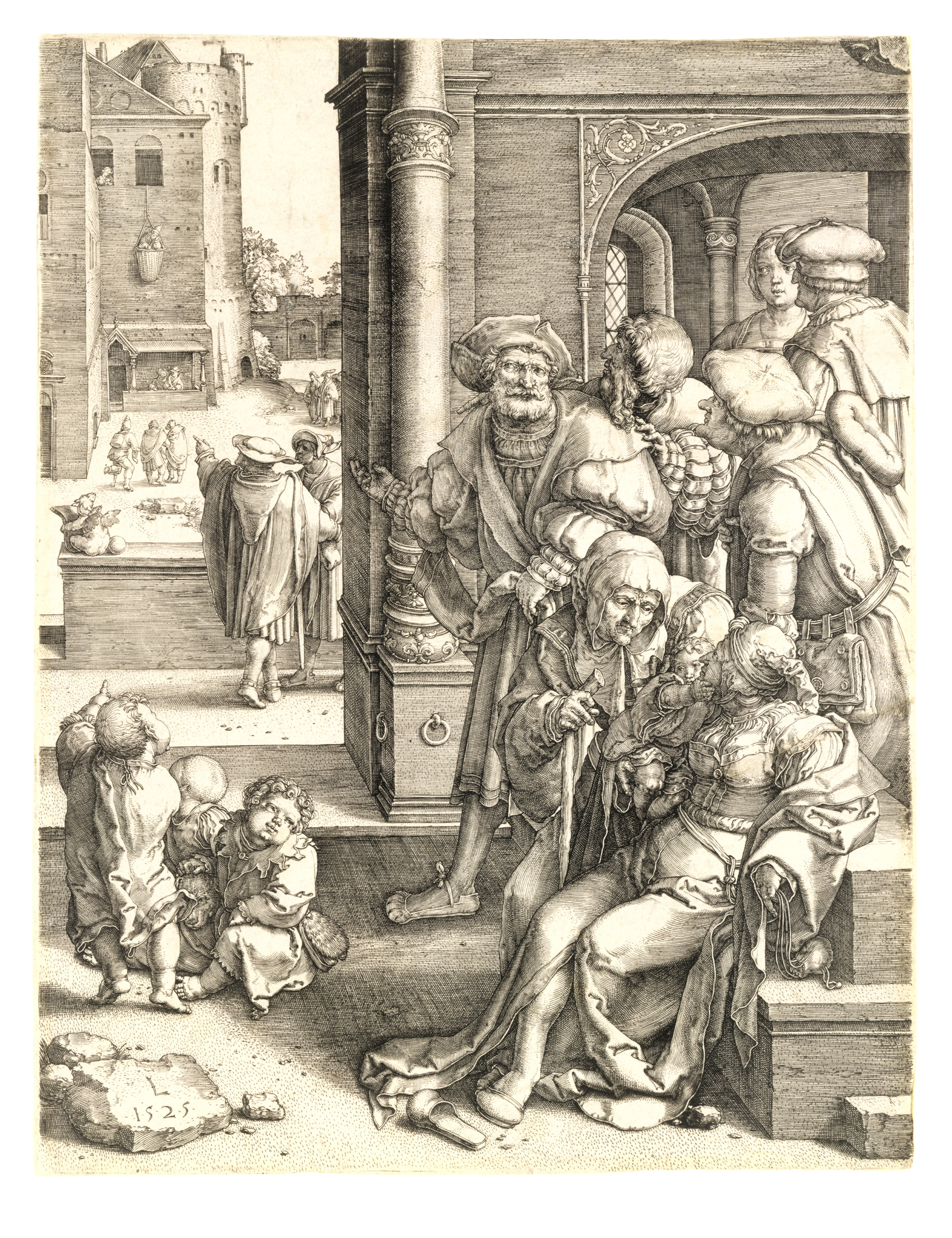
Virgil in a Basket, 1525
Large Power of Women Woodcuts

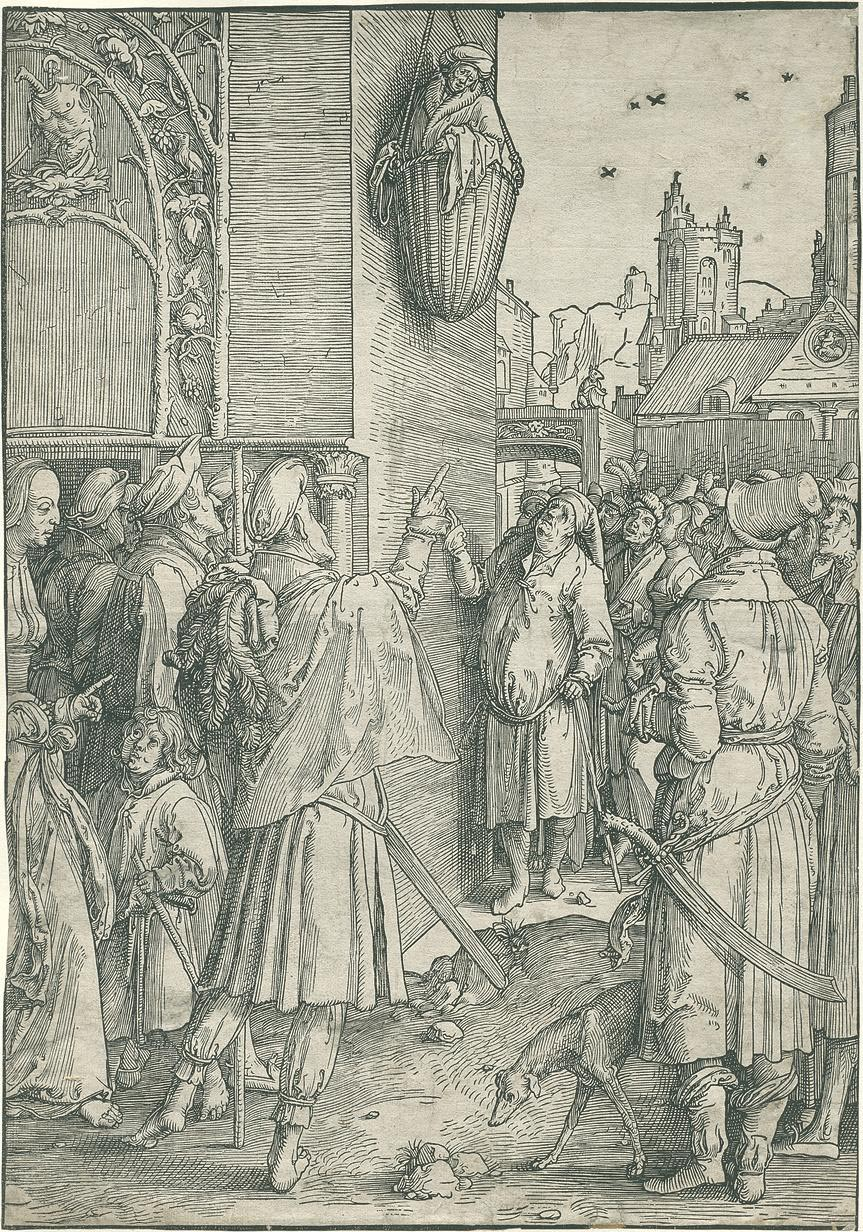
The Poet Virgil Suspended in a Basket

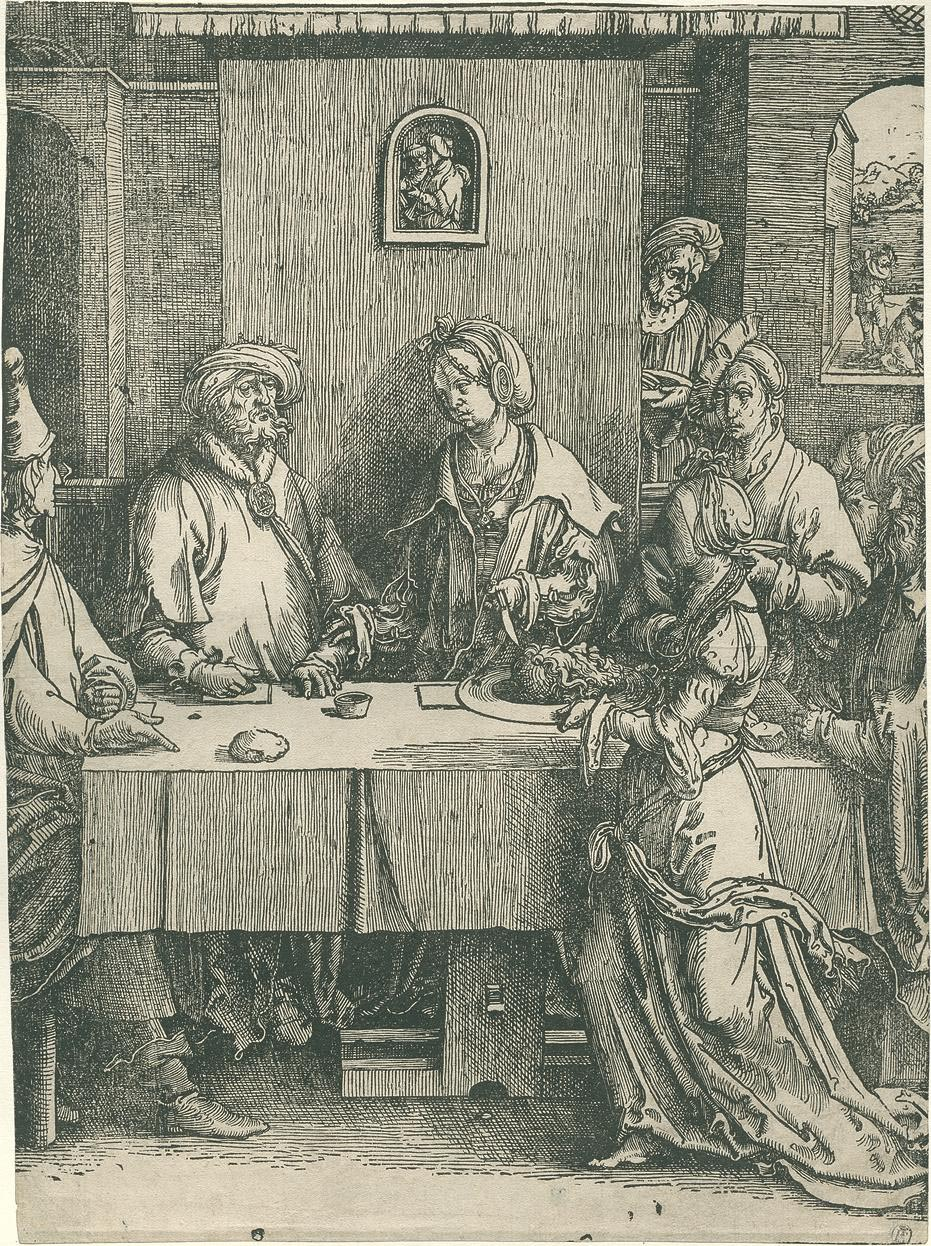
Herod and Herodias

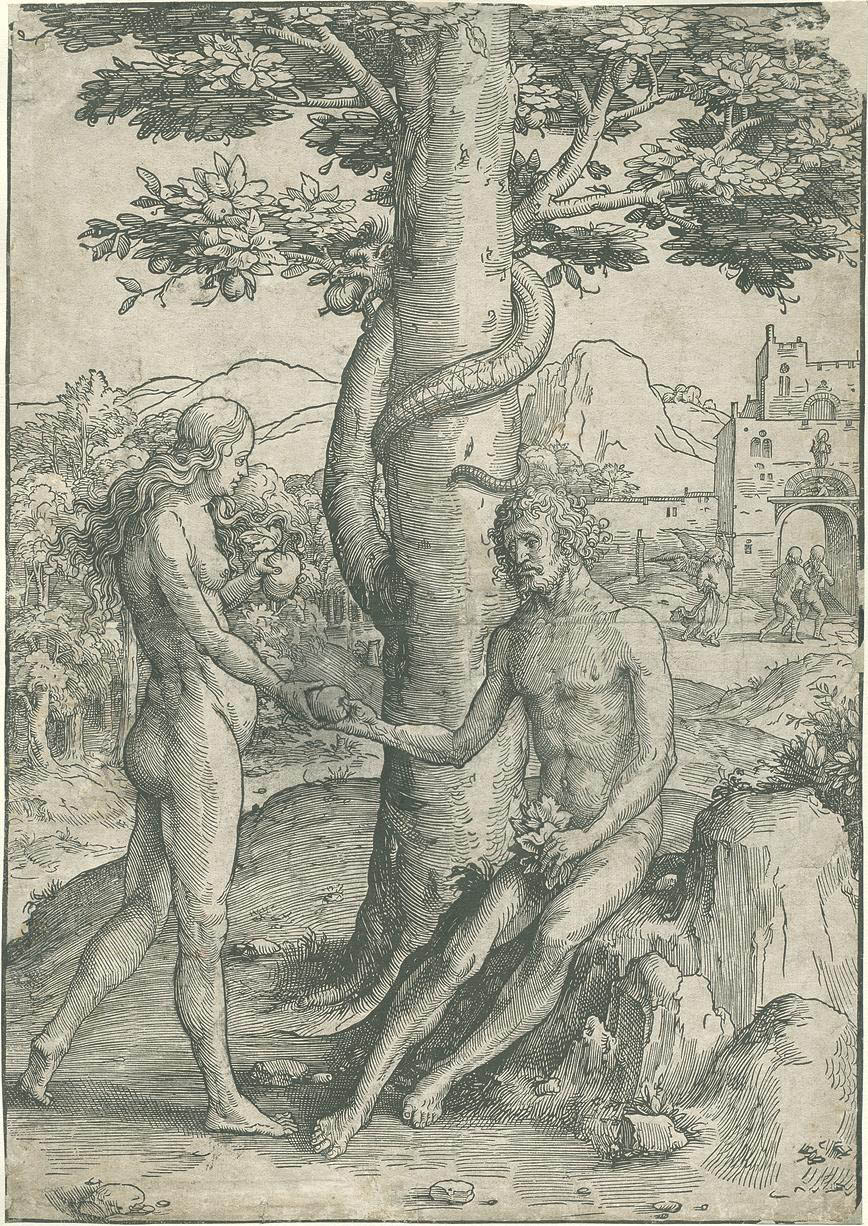
The Fall of Man
Small Power of Women Woodcuts

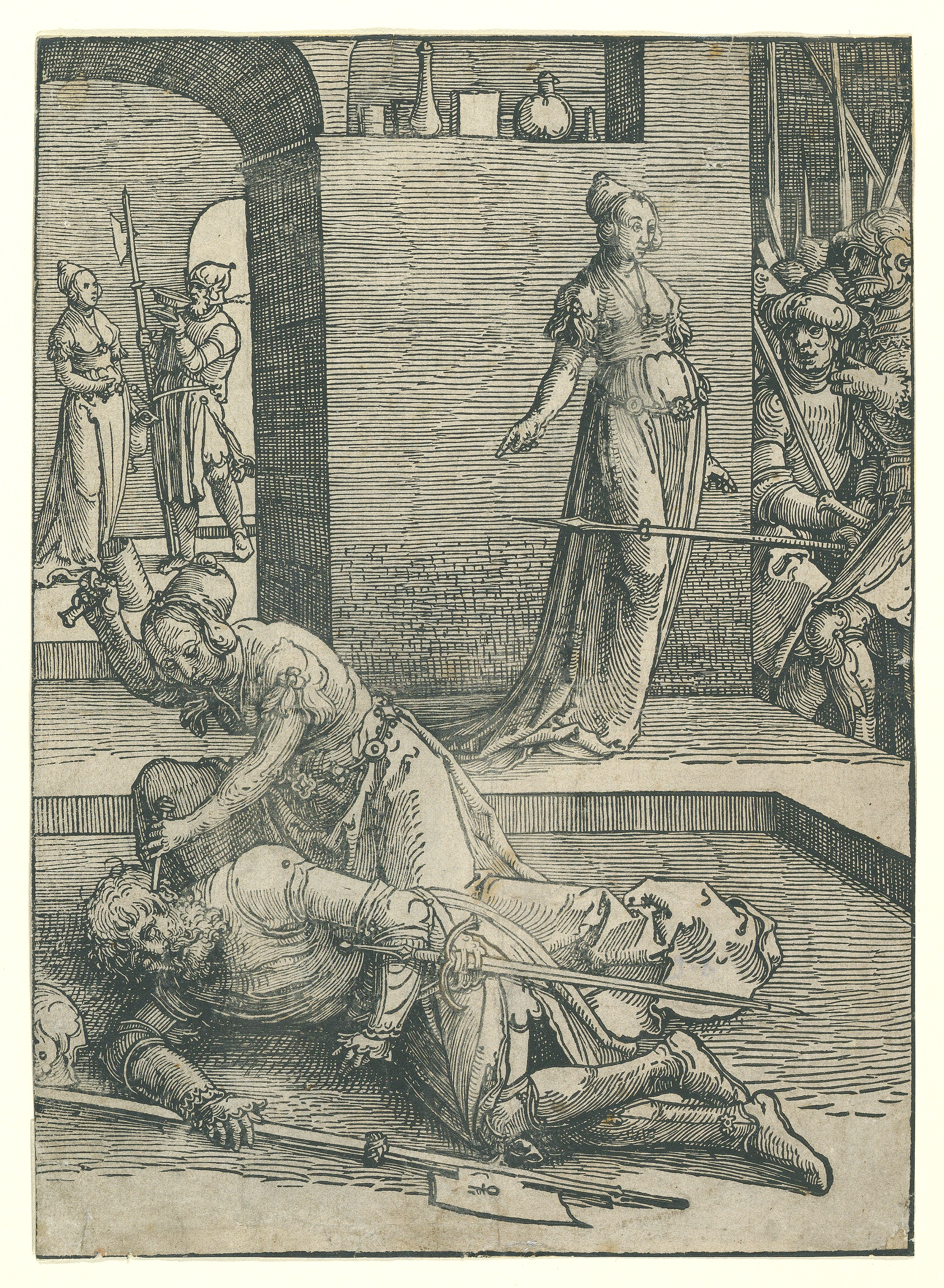
Jael Killing Sisera

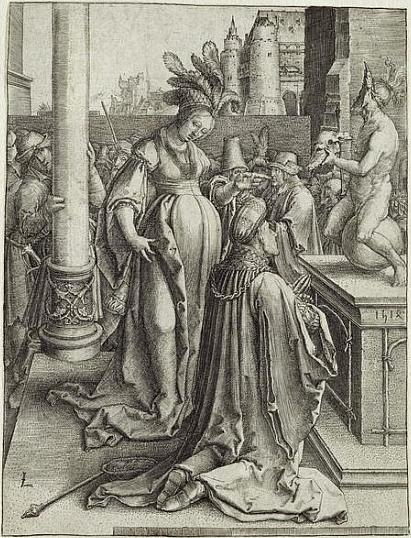
Solomon's Idolatry

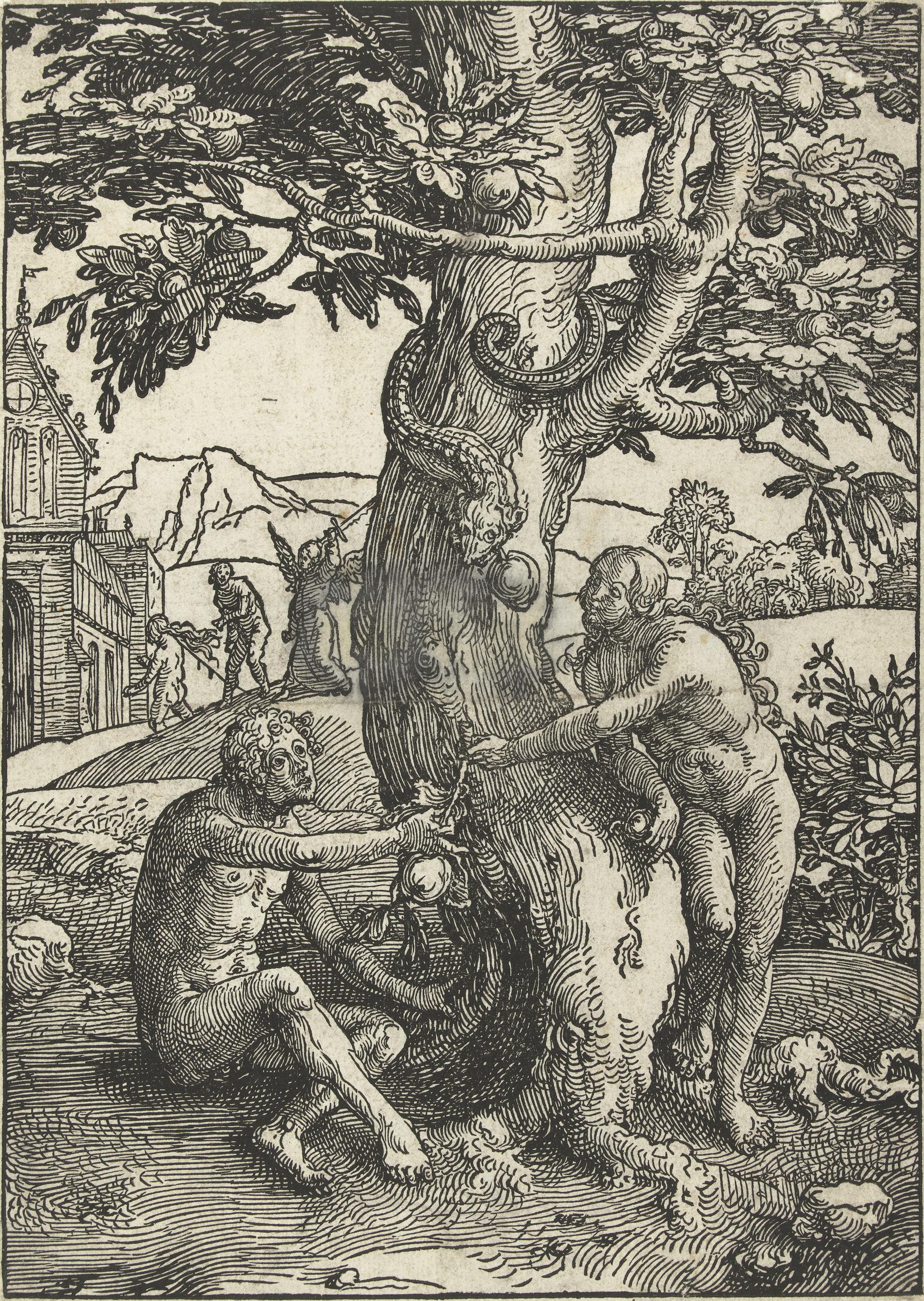
The Fall of Man

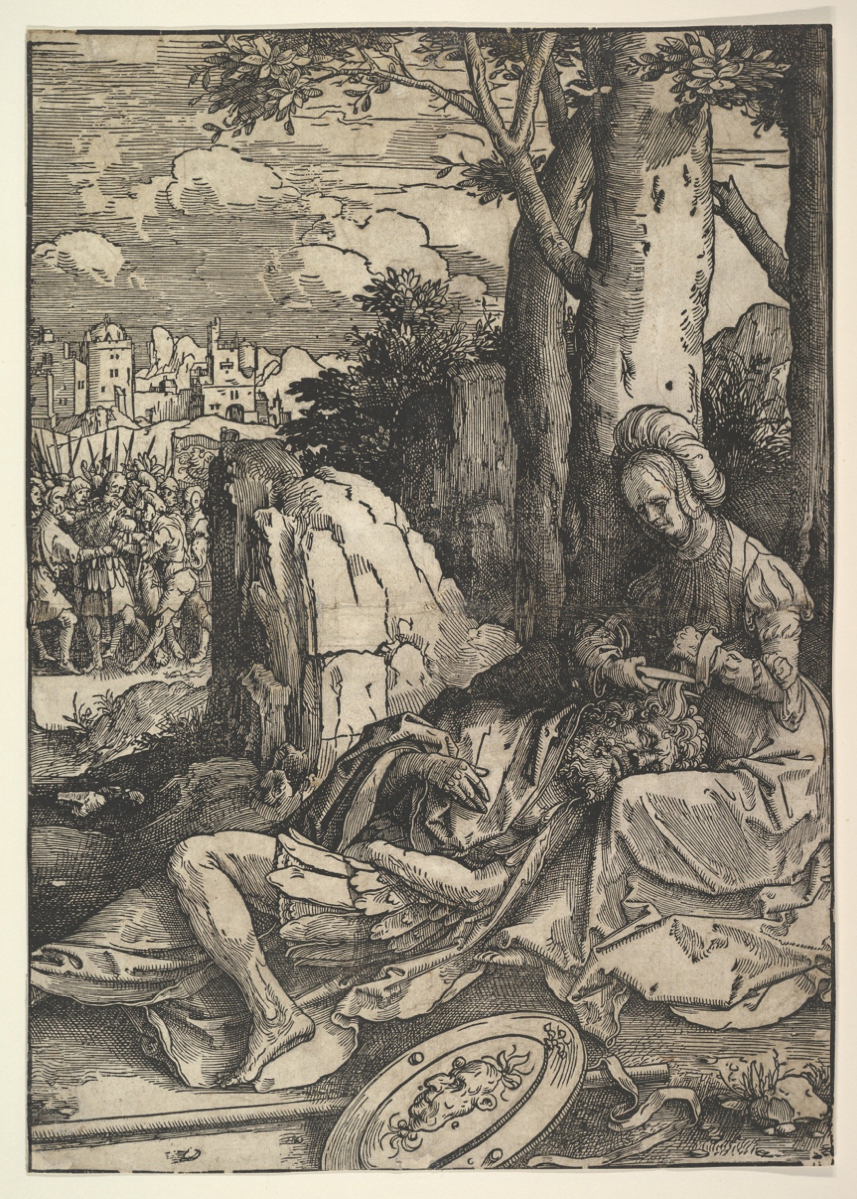
Samson and Delilah

== See also ==
- Renaissance in the Netherlands
