= Cornelis Cornelisz Kunst =

Dutch Renaissance painter

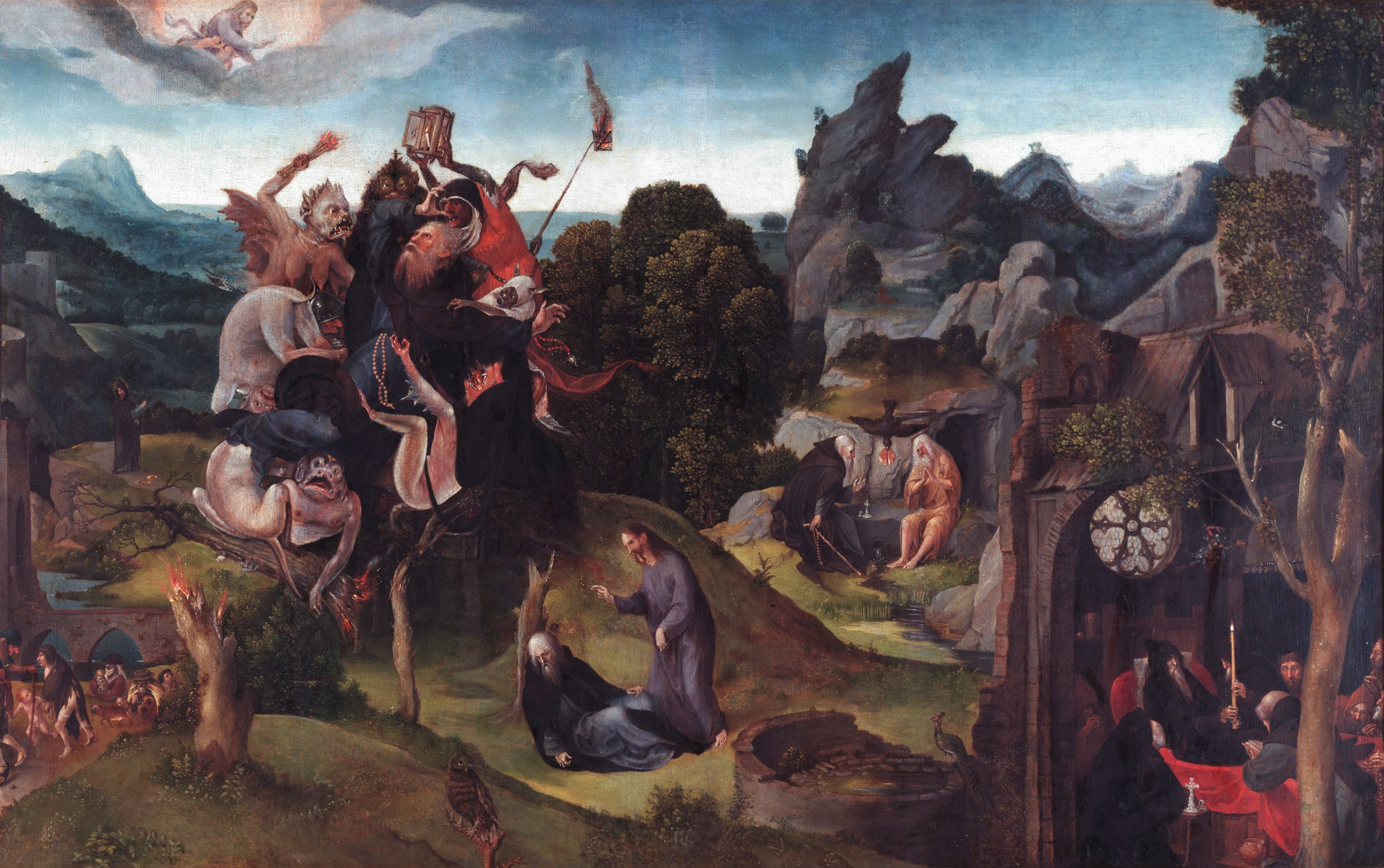
The trials of St. Anthony

Cornelis Cornelisz. Kunst (1493, Leiden – 1544, Leiden), was a Dutch Renaissance painter.

== Biography ==
According to Karel van Mander, who claimed he lived 1493–1544, he was the best among his painter-brothers, as son and pupil of his father, the painter Cornelis Engelbrechtsz. He won commissions from the Leiden council members as well as the clergy, specifically Engelendaal Abbey in Leiderdorp. Unfortunately much of that work was lost in the troubles of the Beeldenstorm.

According to the Netherlands Institute for Art History(RKD) he was the son of Cornelis Engebrechtsz and the brother of Pieter Cornelisz. Kunst and Lucas Cornelisz. Kunst. He is known for historical allegories, drawings, and glass painting.
