= Heimkveld Kunst =

Heimkveld Kunst is an Ambient music band, founded in the late of 2005 by C.-04.

== History ==
Heimkveld Kunst started with dark ambient and experimental music, influenced by black metal, dark ambient and symphonic metal bands. Its first songs came in 2006. After several months, Heimkveld Kunst began to make more ambient songs, influenced by dreams and illusions.

== Discography ==
=== Demos ===
- 2006: Prélude
- 2007: Promo Mars 2007 (also known as Partie II)

=== Full-length and EPs ===
- 2009: MM V IX
- 2009: Egaré Dans L'Oubli
- 2010: Old & Abandoned Songs
- 2010: Nature Sounds

=== Others ===
- 2007: Split with Decomposed Corpses.
- 2007: Track Crépuscule de Tristesse appears on the compilation Obscure Synergy Chapter I.
- 2008: Track Prière Universelle appears on the compilation Trinity on Tritherapie by the label Bone Structure
- 2010: Secret Earth
