= Cornelis Engebrechtsz. =

Dutch painter (c.1462-1527)

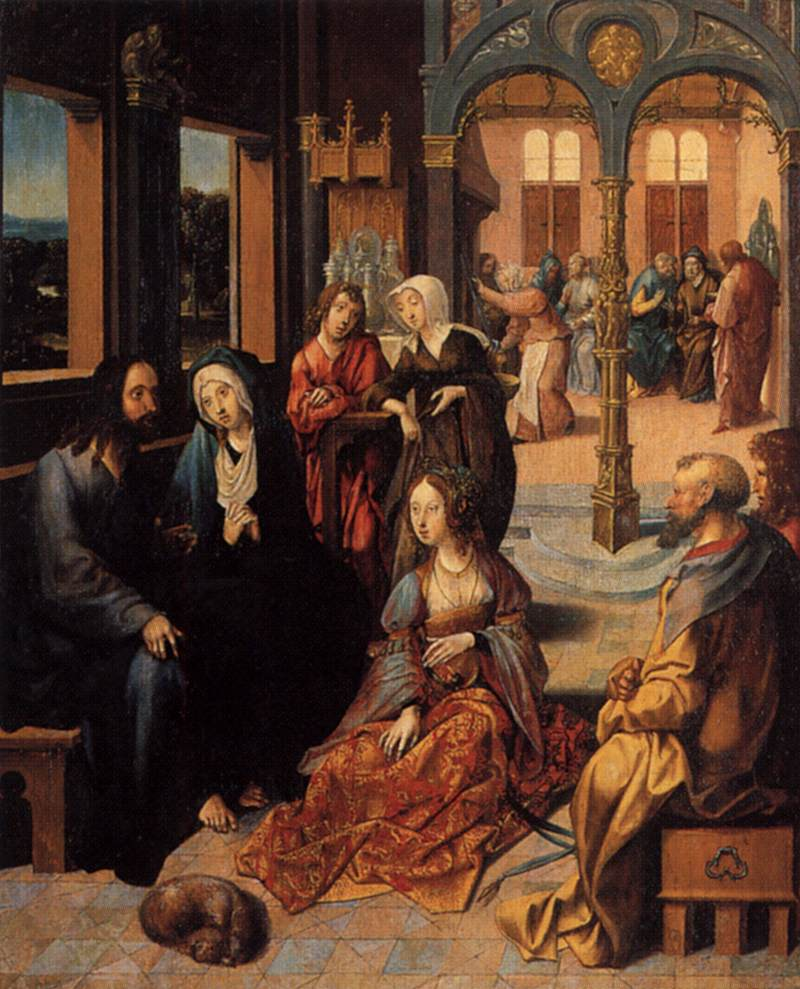
Christ’s second visit to the house of Mary and Martha. Ca. 1515–1520. Rijksmuseum Amsterdam.

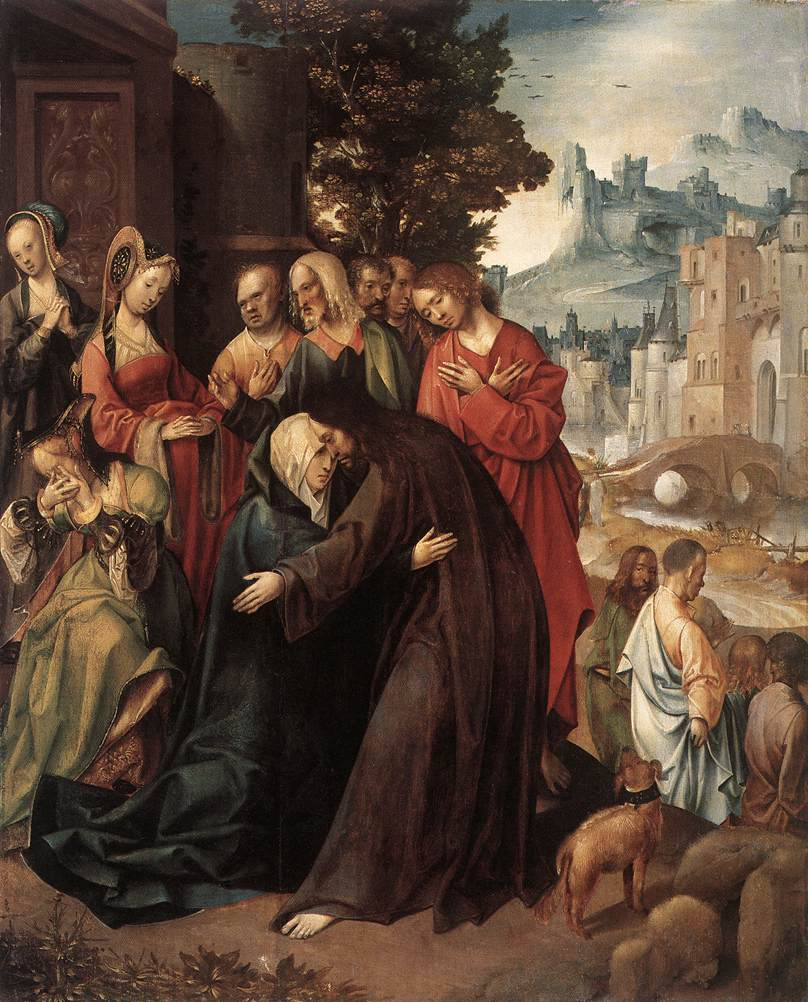
Christ Taking Leave of his Mother. Ca. 1515–1520. Rijksmuseum Amsterdam.

Cornelis Engebrechtsz., (Note: The z. is an archaic Dutch abbreviation for zoon "son".) also known as Cornelis Engelbrechtsz. (c.1462–1527) was an early Dutch painter. He was born and died in Leiden, and is considered the first important painter from that city. Engebrechtsz. taught a number of other Leiden painters, including Lucas van Leyden, Aertgen van Leyden and Engebrechtsz.' own sons Cornelis, Lucas, and Pieter Cornelisz. Kunst. Lucas van Leyden is considered his most important pupil, eclipsing Engebrechtsz. in popularity.

Work by Engebrechtsz. is in the collection of the Rijksmuseum Amsterdam, the Kunsthistorisches Museum in Vienna, the J. Paul Getty Museum in Los Angeles, the Alte Pinakothek in Munich and the Metropolitan Museum of Art in New York, among others.

== Career ==
Engebrechtsz. was the first painter in Leiden to whom work can be attributed with certainty. The first mention of Engebrechtsz. in the archives was in 1482, when he sold some work to the Hieronymusdal priory (also known as Lopsen) in Oegstgeest, near Leiden. He may have been trained as a painter in this monastery as well, although it is also quite possible that he received training in Brussels and Antwerp.

He painted primarily Biblical themes, like a triptych of the Lamentation of Christ and a triptych of the Crucifixion. Both were made for the Mariënpoel convent in Leiden and are now in Leiden's city museum, Stedelijk Museum De Lakenhal. He also received commissions from the Leiden city government. Engebrechtsz. had a large, prolific workshop where he produced devotional art, together with his sons and other pupils. Through his sons, his later work became more and more influenced by Mannerism, a popular style of painting in Antwerp at that time (see Antwerp Mannerism). This Mannerist influence is clearly visible in the two triptychs.

== Life ==
Engebrechtsz. was born sometime between 1460 and 1465. He probably lived in Leiden uninterrupted from about 1497 until his death. Engebrechtsz. was a member of the local archer schutterij (militia) from 1499 tot 1506 and the crossbow militia from 1515 to 1522. Around 1520 he served as captain of the crossbow militia.

Engebrechtsz. married Elysbeth Pietersdr. in of around 1487. They had six children, including three sons, all of whom followed in their father's footsteps and became painters. Engebrechtsz. died somewhere between 11 February and 26 August 1527. There was some quarreling over his inheritance after his death, indicating that he has amassed a considerable estate.

== See also ==
- Dutch and Flemish Renaissance painting
