= Benno =

Benno may refer to:

== People ==
=== Mononym ===
- Benno (bishop of Metz) (927–940), saint
- Benno (bishop of Como) (1049–1061)
- Benno I of Osnabrück (bishop, 1052–1067)
- Benno of Meissen (bishop, 1066–1106), saint
- Benno II of Osnabrück (bishop, 1068–1088)
- Benno of Santi Martino e Silvestro (fl. 1082–1098), cardinal
- Benno (bishop of Cesena) (1123–1141)
- Benno (bishop of Imola) (1126–1139)
- Benno (bishop of Rimini) (1230–1242)

=== First name ===
- Benno von Achenbach (1861–1936), German horse driving pioneer
- Benno Adam (1812–1892), German painter
- Benno Adolph (1912–1967), German physician
- Benno Ammann (1904–1986), Swiss conductor and composer
- Benno von Arent (1898–1956), German film director
- Benno Arnold (1876–1944), German industrialist
- Benno Artmann (1933–2010), German mathematician
- Benno Baginsky (1848–1919), German physician
- Benno Basso (died 1936), German entrepreneur and politician
- Benno Becker (1860–1938), German painter
- Benno Beiroth (died 1942), German footballer
- Benno Berneis (1883–1916), German painter
- Benno Besson (1922–2006), Swiss actor and director
- Benno Friedrich Brand von Lindau (1571–1625), member of the Fruitbearing Society
- Benno Brausewetter (1869–1965), Austrian industrialist
- Benno Brückner (1824–1905), German theologian
- Benno Budar (died 1946), Sorbian writer
- Benno Chajes (1880–1938), German physician
- Benno Cohen (1894–1975), Israeli politician
- Benno Credé (1847–1929), German surgeon
- Benno Danner (1857–1917), German entrepreneur
- Benno Diederich (1870–1947), German philologist
- Benno Dorer (born 1964), German businessman
- Benno Elbs (born 1960), Austrian Catholic priest and bishop of Feldkirch
- Benno Elkan (1877–1960), German–born British sculptor
- Benno Erdmann (1851–1921), German neo–Kantian philosopher
- Benno Fiala Ritter von Fernbrugg (1890–1964), Austro–Hungarian fighter ace
- Benno Fischer (1902–1981), Czechoslovak politician
- Benno Friesen (1929–2021), Canadian professor and politician
- Benno Fürmann (born 1972), German film and television actor
- Benno Geiger (1882–1965), Austrian art historian
- Benno de Goeij (born 1975), Dutch record producer
- Benno Griebert (1909–2000), German art historian and art dealer
- Benno Groß (born 1957), German gymnast
- Benno Gut (1897–1970), Benedictine monk and cardinal
- Benno Hansen (1891–1952), Estonian singer
- Benno Herrmann (1918–1999), German pilot and recipient of the Knight's Cross of the Iron Cross
- Benno Hoffmann (1919–2005), German dancer and actor
- Benno Hurt (died 1941), German writer, photographer and lawyer
- Benno Jacob (1862–1945), Jewish rabbi and Bible scholar
- Benno Janssen (1874–1964), American architect
- Benno Karner (born 1901), Austrian bobsledder
- Benno Kerry (1858–1889), Austrian philosopher
- Benno Kögl (1892–1973), German painter
- Benno Kuipers (born 1974), Dutch swimmer
- Benno Kusche (1916–2010), German operatic baritone
- Benno Landsberger (1890–1968), German Assyriologist
- Benno Larsen (born 1949), Danish footballer
- Benno Leesik (1960–2006), Estonian military officer
- Benno Max Leser-Lasario (fl. 1890–1920), Austrian singer
- Benno Lischer (1876–1959), American orthodontist
- Benno Magnusson (born 1953), Swedish footballer
- Benno Martin (1893–1975), German SS functionary
- Benno Mengele (1898–1971), Austrian electrical engineer
- Benno Meyer-Wehlack (1928–2014), German writer
- Benno Mikkal (1912–1981), Estonian actress
- Benno Möhlmann (born 1954), German footballer and manager
- Benno Moiseiwitsch (1890–1963), Russian–born British pianist
- Benno Mugdan (1851–1928), German jurist
- Benno Müller-Hill (1933–2018), German biologist
- Benno Ndulu (1950–2021), Tanzanian banker
- Benno Orenstein (1851–1926), German industrialist
- Benno Parthier (1932–2019), German biologist
- Benno Planek (1834–1922), Moravian rabbi and writer
- Benno Pludra (1925–2014), German children's author
- Benno Premsela (1920–1997), Dutch artist and collector
- Benno Rabinof (1902–1975), American violinist
- Benno Reinhardt (1819–1852), German physician
- Benno Reuter (1911–1980), German soldier and recipient of the Knight's Cross of the Iron Cross
- Benno Rössler (1931–2014), Czech Catholic priest
- Benno Saelens (born 1948), Belgian volleyball player
- Benno C. Schmidt Jr. (born 1942), private school chairman
- Benno C. Schmidt Sr. (1913–1999), American lawyer and venture capitalist
- Benno Schmitz (born 1994), German footballer
- Benno Schmoldt (1920–2006), German educator
- Benno Schotz (1891–1984), Estonian–born Scottish sculptor
- Benno Seppelt (1846–1931), Australian winemaker
- Benno Singer (1875–1934), Hungarian–born British entertainment administrator
- Benno Sternberg (1894–1962), Ukrainian Zionist
- Benno Sterzenbach (1916–1985), German actor and director
- Benno Straucher (1854–1940), Jewish Austro–Hungarian lawyer and politician
- Benno Teschke (born 1967), German international relations theorist
- Benno Frederick Toermer (1804–1859), German painter
- Benno Vigny (1889–1965), French–German novelist and screenwriter
- Benno Walter (1847–1901), German violinist
- Benno Wandolleck (1864 – 1930), German sports shooter and zoologist
- Benno Werlen (born 1952), Swiss geographer
- Benno von Wiese (1903–1987), German scholar
- Benno Wiss (born 1962), Swiss cyclist
- Benno Wolf (1871–1943), German judge and speleologist
- Benno Ziegler (1887–1963), German operatic baritone

=== Surname ===
- Alex Benno (1873–1952), Dutch actor and director
- Johann Ernst Benno (1777–1848), German writer
- Marc Benno (born 1947), American musician
- Tiina Benno (born 1961), Estonian politician

== Other ==
- Benno Stehkragen, a 1927 German silent film
- Benno von Archimboldi, a fictional character in the novel 2666 by Roberto Bolaño
- Benno Bikes, a bicycle manufacturer

== See also ==
- Saint Benno (disambiguation)
