= Saelens =

Saelens is a patronymic surname of Flemish origin, derived from the given name Salomon. Notable people with the surname include:

- David Saelens (born 1975), Belgian racing driver
- Benno Saelens (born 1948), Belgian volleyball player
- Kobe (artist) (pseudonym of Jacques Saelens; 1950–2014), Belgian visual artist and sculptor
- Xavier Saelens (born 1965), Belgian scientist

== See also ==
- Sælen (surname)
