= Frans Pourbus =

Frans Pourbus is the name of:

- Frans Pourbus the Younger (1569–1622), Flemish painter, son of Frans Pourbus the Elder
- Frans Pourbus the Elder (1545–1581), Flemish painter, father of Frans Pourbus the younger
