= Sælen (surname) =

Sælen is a surname of Norwegian origin. Notable people with the surname include:

- Frithjof Sælen (disambiguation), multiple people
- Ivar Bergersen Sælen (1855–1923), Norwegian politician
- Kjetil Sælen (born 1969), Norwegian football referee
- Odd Henrik Sælen (1920–2008), Norwegian oceanographer

== See also ==
- HDMS Sælen, a submarine used by the Royal Danish Navy
- Sælen Church, a parish church in Vestland, Norway
- Saelens, a surname
