= KOGL (disambiguation) =

The KOGL, or Korea Open Government License, is South Korea's media license to allow distribution of copyrighted materials from their government.

Kogl, Kögl or KOGL may also refer to:

- KOGL (FM), a radio station (89.3 FM) in Gleneden Beach, Oregon, United States

== People with the surname ==
- Benedikt Kögl (1892–1973), a German artist
- Denise Kögl (born 1988), Austrian former competitive figure skater
- Herbert Kögl (born 1966), Austrian luger
- Ludwig Kögl (born 1966), German former footballer
