= Ideological realism =

Artistic movement in Russia

Ideological realism was an artistic movement in 19th century Russia, including groups like Peredvizhniki.

Ideological realism is also a name for a literary current that reached its zenith in the 19th century. It was very similar to realism, but ideological realism tried to deliver an ideological message to the reader, in addition to staying close to reality. Famous writers that can be described as ideological realists include Charles Dickens and Dutch poet Jacob Cats.
