= Israel Covyn =

Dutch Golden Age painter (1582–1665)

Israel Covyn (1582, Antwerp – 1665, Antwerp), was a Dutch Golden Age genre painter.

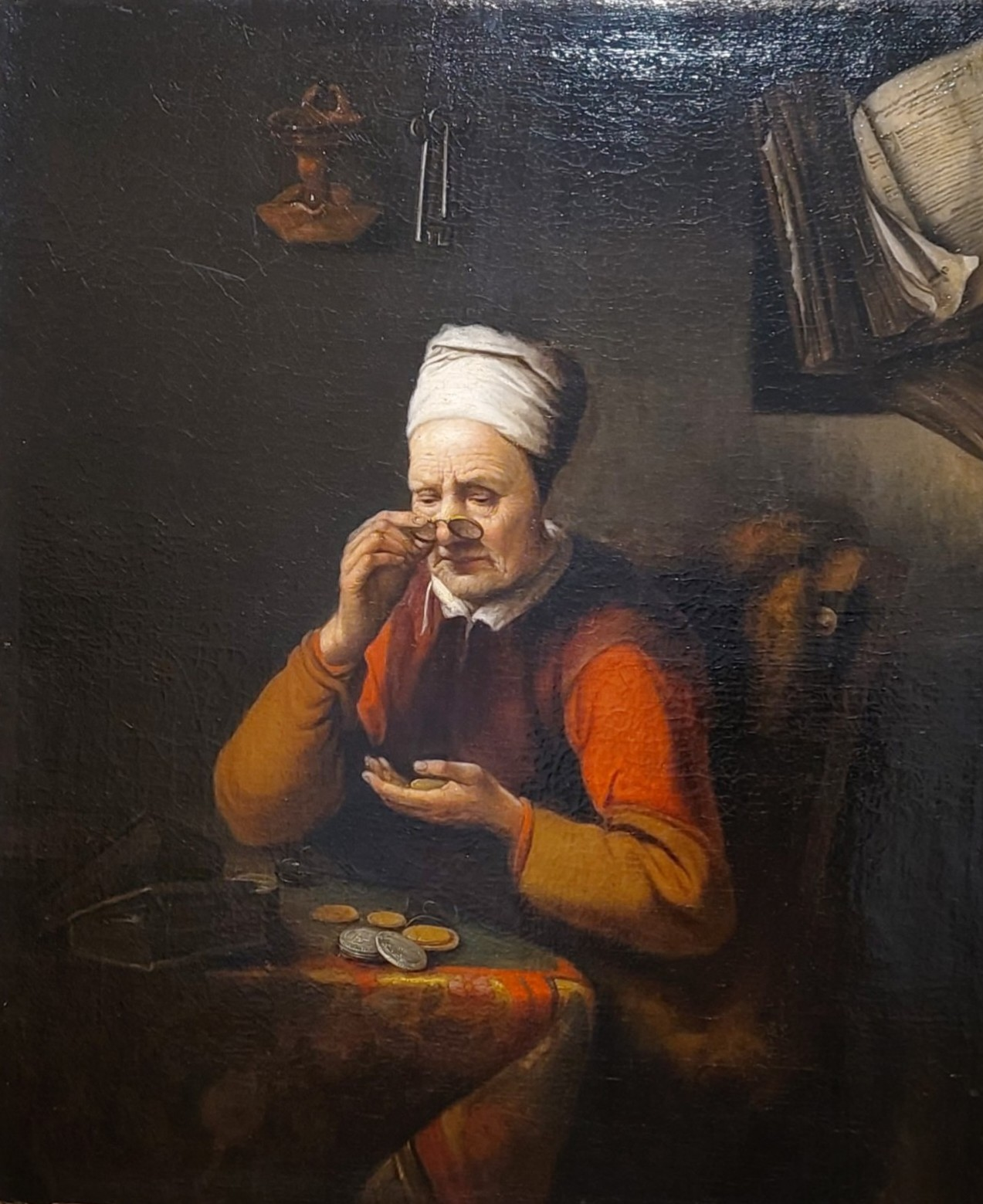
Old lady counting money - Israel Covyn, Dordrecht 1647 Hermitage, Saint Petersburg

== Biography ==
According to Houbraken he was the older brother of the painter Reynier Covyn. He painted scenes from the Spaens Heydinnetje, a popular book by Jacob Cats loosely based on one of the pastoral scenes from Cervantes' Don Quixote. Houbraken wrote that he was the oldest painter he knew in the Dordrecht Guild of St. Luke, and that he had been a member there since 1647. Houbraken remembered him on St. Luke's day (October 18) at the guild table wearing a wreath of grape vines, an old tradition that was still ongoing when Houbraken was writing in 1711.

According to the RKD he was the older brother of Reynier Covyn, but no known works survive.
