= Reynier Covyn =

Dutch painter (1632–1681)

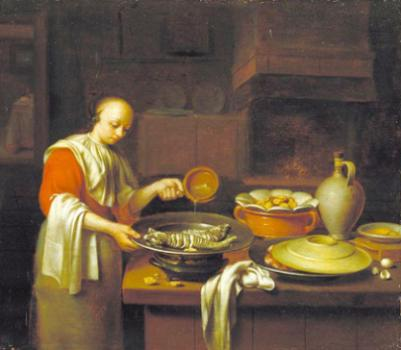
Kitchen interior

Reynier Covyn (1632, Antwerp – 1681, Dordrecht), was a Dutch Golden Age genre painter.

== Biography ==
According to Houbraken he usually painted a table with all sorts of vegetables; cabbage, carrots, celery root, artichokes, and so forth, with a servant girl carrying an egg basket or copper bucket on her arm, or a young lady sewing or doing needlework. He was the brother of Israel Covyn.

According to the RKD he married on 26 May 1662 in Papendrecht, and lived in 1667 in Dordrecht in the Breestraat. He made a trip with his brother Israel Covyn to Antwerp in 1674. He was a follower (and possibly a pupil) of Nicolaes Maes and is known for kitchen scenes, fruit still lifes, and breakfast pieces.
