= Hortensia del Prado =

Horticulturist in Zeeland, Netherlands (died 1627)

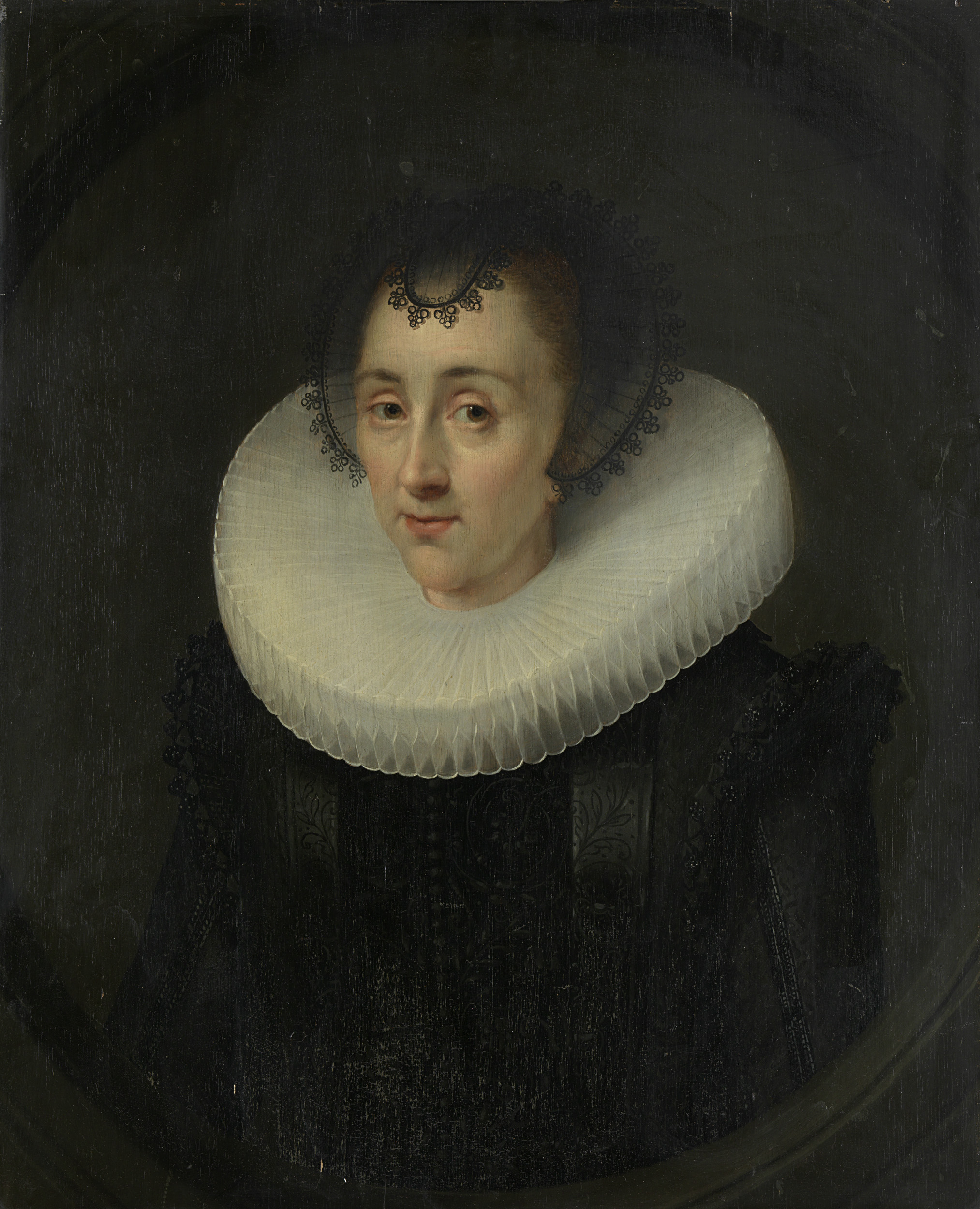
- Portrait by Salomon Mesdach, c. 1625
- Died: 18 June 1627
- Occupations: Nobelwoman, horticulturalist
- Era: Dutch Golden Age

Hortensia del Prado (d. 1627) was a Dutch noblewoman and horticulturalist whose garden in Middelburg was featured by the poet Jacob Cats.

== Biography ==
Whilst little is known about del Prado's early life, the names of her two husbands and her talent in horticulture are recorded. Her first husband was Jean Fourmenois. After his death she then married Pieter Courten. The names of her husbands are recorded through the paintings that were commissioned of them. From her first marriage, she had one daughter Catharina Fourmenois. Del Prado and Courten had no children.

Courten and del Prado lived on the Lange Noordstraat in Middelburg and a neighbour was the poet Jacob Cats. Del Prado was one of several enthusiastic horticulturalists in Middelburg in the seventeenth century and plant-swapping was part of social life for the wealthy there. Del Prado had built the garden in 1613 and it was large enough for a 'hundred' fountains, which also held fish and were supposedly powered by the Rhine, as well as a wooded area and a meadow – all within the middle of the town. Cats featured the couple's garden in his 1624 poem Houwelick, praising its fruit "from distant beaches" and the rare flowers "without any name".

Del Prado died on 18 June 1627.

== Legacy ==
The Rijksmuseum has three portraits of del Prado in its collection: two by Gortzius Geldorp dating to 1596 and 1599; one by Salomon Mesdach created c. 1625. Del Prado's portraits are a rich source for fashion historians, noted in particular for the black lace she wears in the Mesdach portrait.

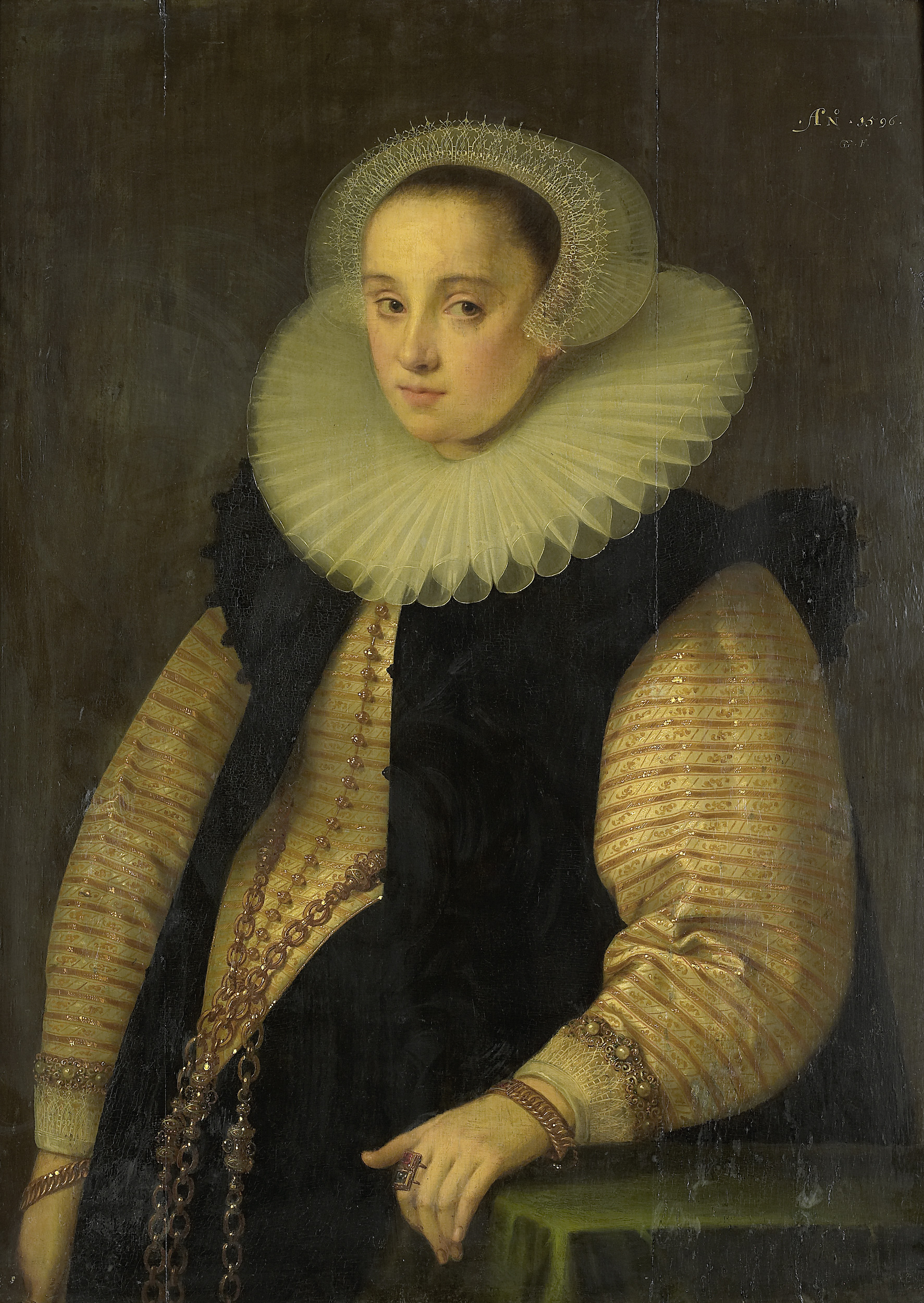
Portrait of del Prado, 1596, Gortzius Geldorp.

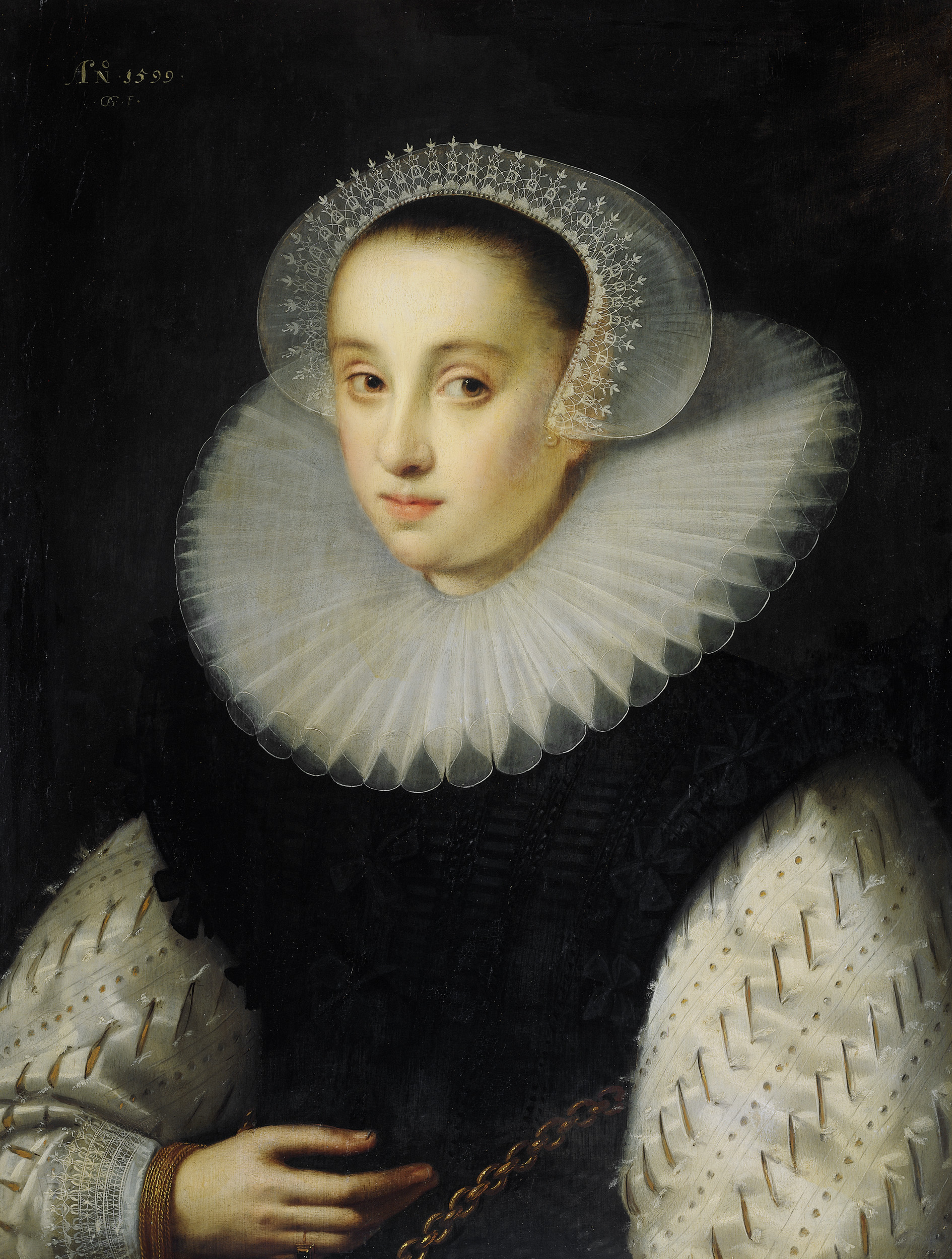
Portrait of del Prado, 1599, Gortzius Geldorp.

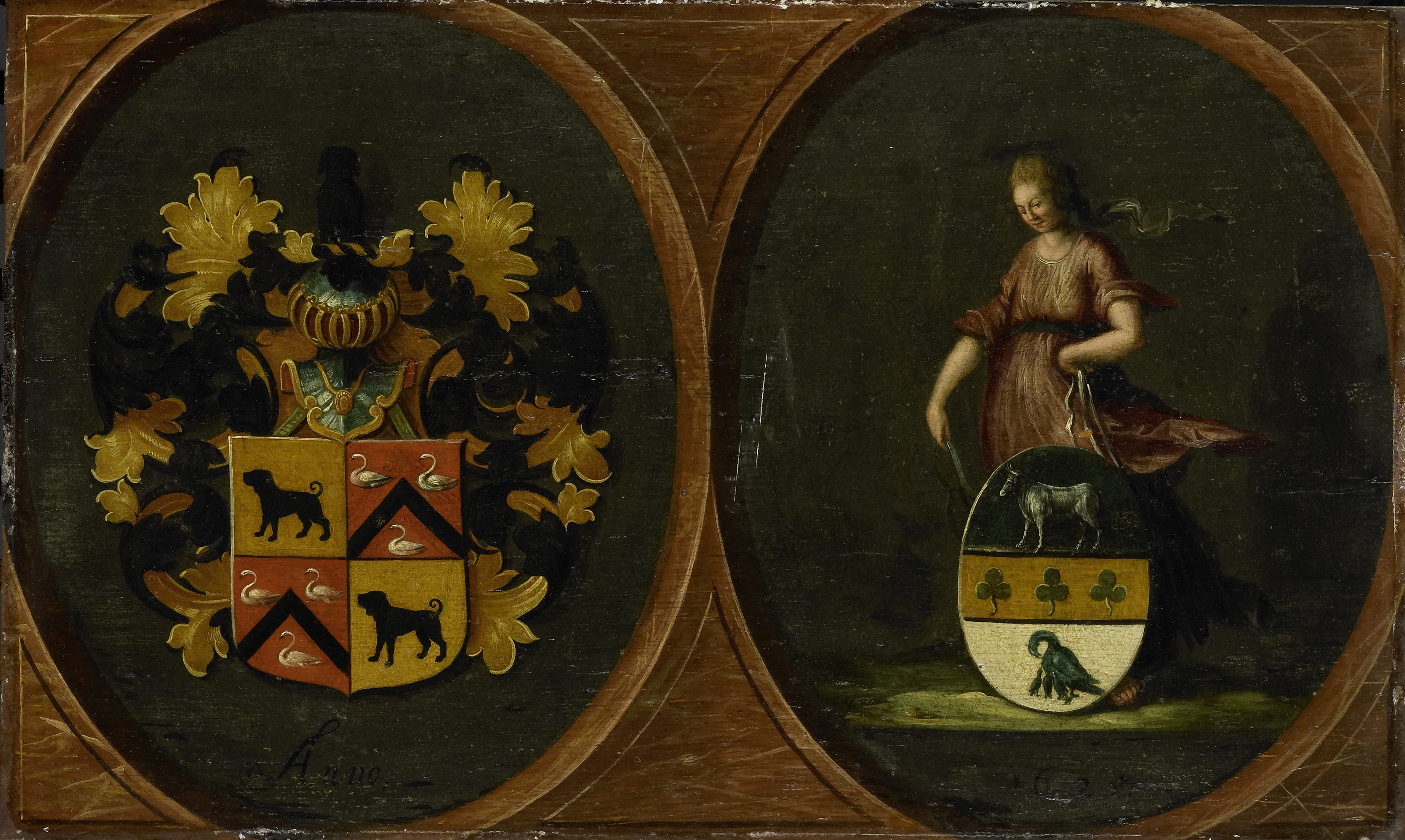
Coat of arms with the coats of arms of the couple Pieter Courten and Hortensia del Prado, 1625.
