= Saint Benno =

Saint Benno, St Benno or St. Benno (German: Sankt Benno) may refer to:

== People ==
- Saint Benno of Metz (927–940)
- Saint Benno of Meissen (bishop, 1066–1106)
- Blessed Benno II of Osnabrück (bishop, 1068–1088)

== Churches ==
- Ermita de San Benón in Villarroya de los Pinares, Spain
- Saint Benno's Church, Bad Lauterberg
- Saint Benno's Church, Goslar
- Saint Benno's Church, Hannover
- Saint Benno's Church, Meissen
- St. Benno, Munich
- Saint Benno's Church, Spremberg
- Saint Benno's Church, Türkheim
- Saint Benno's Church, Warsaw

== Other ==
- St. Benno-Gymnasium, school in Dresden
- St. Benno Verlag, Catholic publisher
- St.-Benno-Viertel, area in Munich

== See also ==
- Benno (disambiguation)
