= Catshuis =

Official residence of the Prime Minister of the Netherlands

Coordinates: 52.090°N 4.285°E

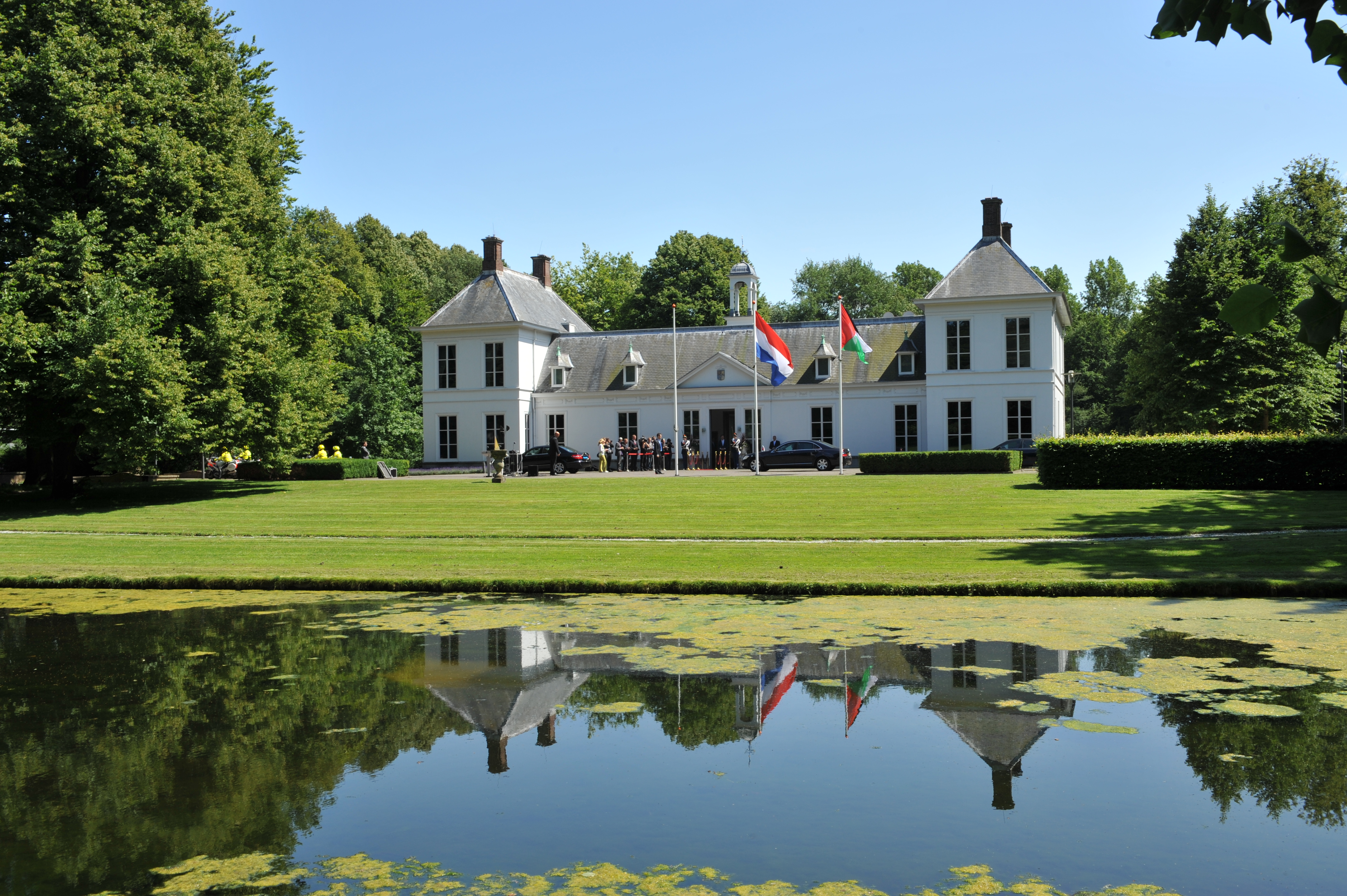
- The Catshuis in June 2011
- Former names: Huis Sorgvliet

General information
- Location: The Hague, Netherlands, Adriaan Goekooplaan 10, 2517 JX, Netherlands
- Current tenants: Rob Jetten (2026–present)
- Construction started: 6 May 1651
- Completed: 14 July 1652
- Client: Jacob Cats

Design and construction
- Architect: Claes Dircx van Balckeneynde

The Catshuis (Dutch pronunciation: [ˈkɑtsɦœys]; English: Cats House), initially known as Huis Sorgvliet ([ˌɦœys ˈsɔr(ə)xflit]; Sorgvliet House), is the official residence of the prime minister of the Netherlands. Built in 1651–1652 for Jacob Cats as a private villa, it was renamed after him after his death.

The Catshuis lies in The Hague on the road to Scheveningen. It has been the official residence of the Prime Minister of the Netherlands since 1963, although Dries van Agt was the last premier to live there. Prime Ministers since then have preferred to live in their own homes. The Catshuis residence is mainly used to house political meetings and receive official guests.

== History ==
As Huis Sorgvliet it was built on the site of a former farm, part of the living quarters were likely incorporated in the left wing, by Jacob Cats (1577–1660), a prominent poet and politician who lived there from 14 July 1652. Originally it had only one storey.

In 1675 estate Sorgvliet came into the possession of Hans Willem Bentinck, chamberlain of the future King-Stadholder William III (1650–1702). His son, Willem Bentinck, had a bronze bell and tower installed in 1738.

To conform with modern norms of security, logistics, climatisation, hygiene, comfort and technical aspects of management, it was extensively renovated from 1999 to 2004.

== Gallery ==
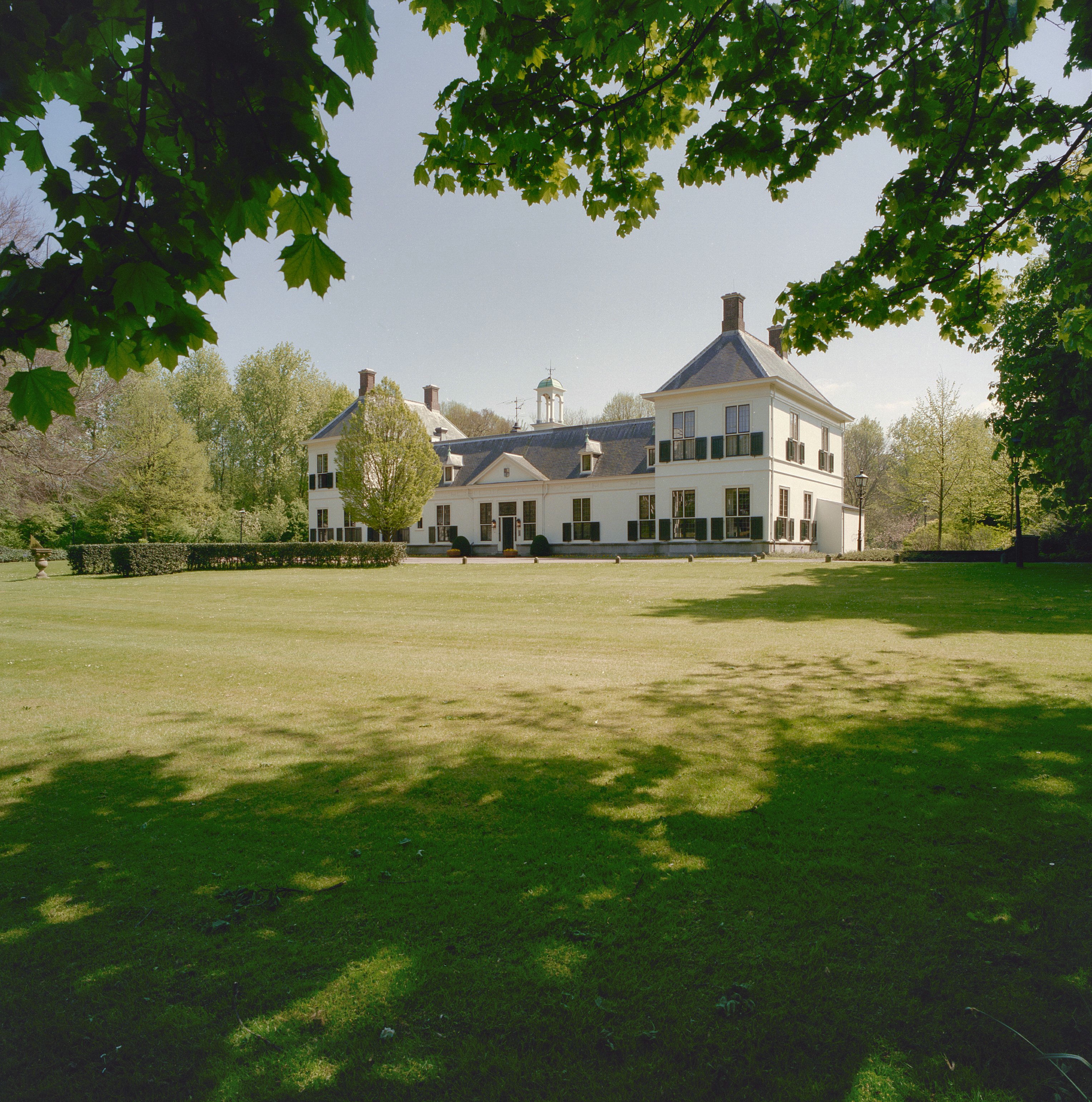
Front of the Catshuis

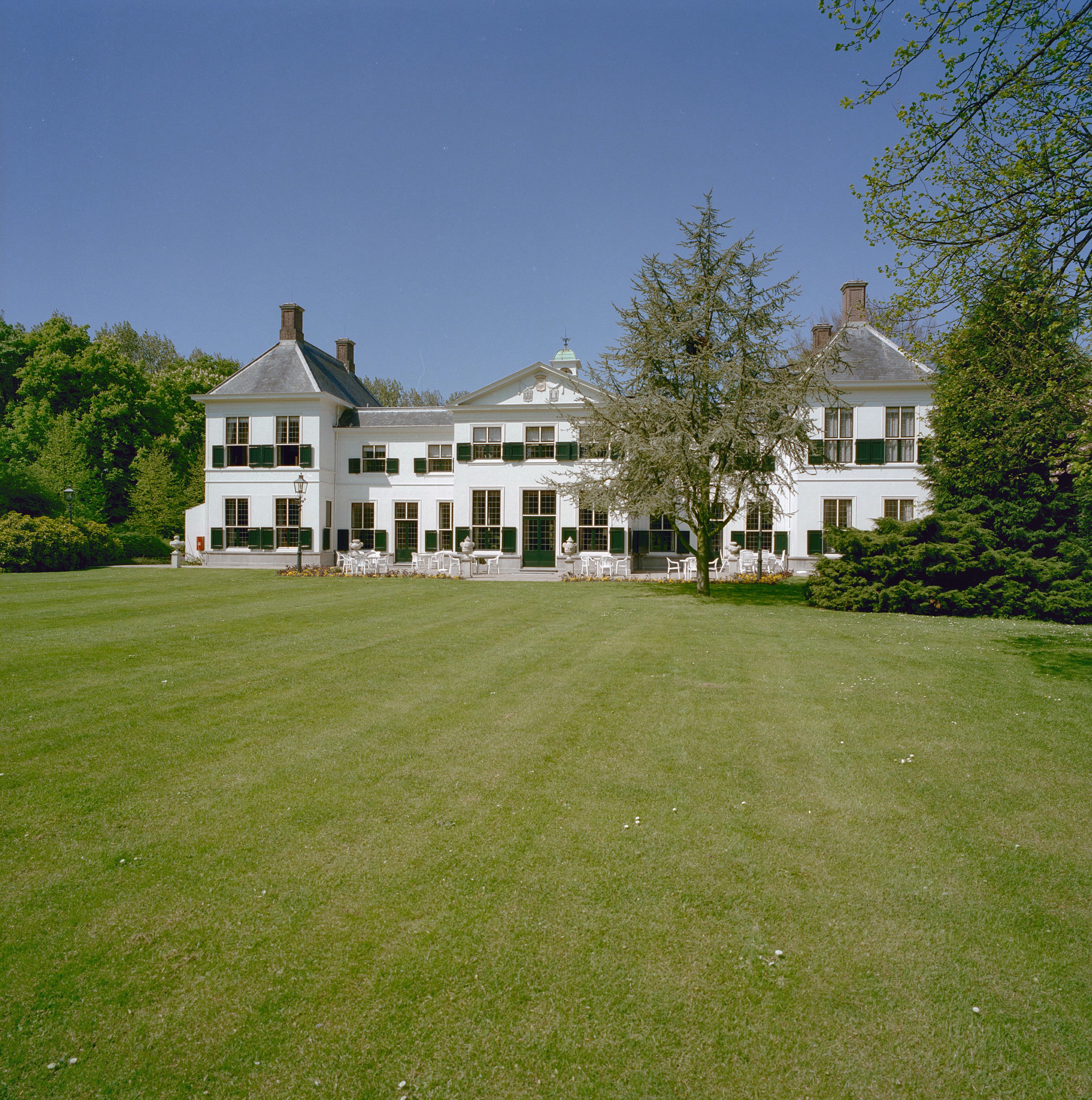
Back of the Catshuis

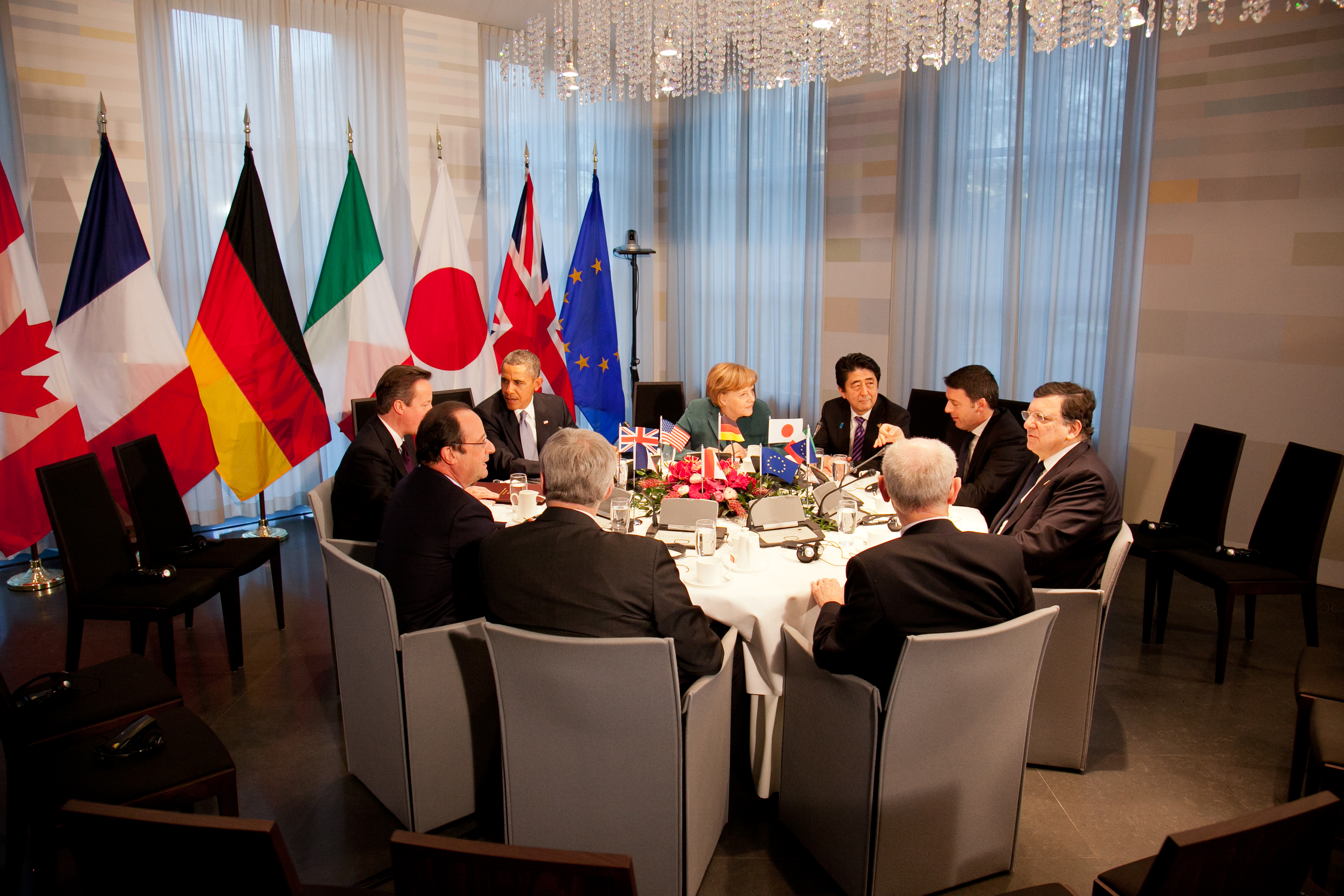
G7 leaders during the emergency meeting about the 2014 Russian annexation of Crimea, hosted by the Netherlands

== Sources ==
- Introductiedossier Ministerie van Algemene Zaken (in Dutch): Catshuis
