= Donald Knauss =

American business executive (born 1951)

- Born: 1951 (age 74–75)
- Education: Indiana University Bloomington
- Occupation: Businessman

Donald R. Knauss (born 1951) is an American business executive. He is a former chief executive officer of Clorox.

== Early life ==
Knauss has a BA in history from Indiana University Bloomington, graduating in 1977.

== Career ==
Knauss commissioned a 2nd lieutenant in the U.S. Marine Corps, initially serving in Hawaii in 1978 as an Artillery Officer; he left in 1981 and took up a position with Procter & Gamble.

Knauss worked for Frito-Lay and Tropicana, mainly in marketing, although he also was head of the southeast sales department for Frito-Lay.

Knauss was head of the North American operations of The Coca-Cola Company.

In 2006, Knauss became the Chief Executive Officer of Clorox. According to Forbes he received $21.8 million compensation from 2007 to 2012; $6.37m remuneration in 2012, making him the 11th highest-earning CEO in household and personal products. In November 2014, Knauss stepped down as CEO of Clorox but remained as chairman. Knauss was succeeded by Benno Dorer, who had been Clorox's executive VP and chief operating officer.

Knauss holds key roles at three companies: Clorox Company (director and chairman of the board), McKesson Corporation (independent director), URS Corporation (director) and Kellogg Company (director). In addition, in 2014 he was appointed to the newly created position at Clorox of executive chairman. While CEO at Clorox, Knauss led the 2007 purchase of Burt's Bees for $925m, which was in response to the firm's sluggish growth in other areas.

In the fiscal year of 2014, with Knauss in these executive roles, Clorox generated $5.6bn.

== Civic activities ==
Knauss is the chairman of the board of trustees at the University of San Diego, where he has served as a board member since 2008. The Knass School of Business at the University of San Diego is named for Knauss and his wife, Ellie, in recognition of their philanthropic support. He is also on the board of trustees of the US Marine Corps University Foundation, a member of the Economic Advisory Council At Federal Reserve Bank of San Francisco, and on the board of trustees for the University Foundation and Morehouse College. Knauss is on the Dean's advisory board at the College of Arts & Sciences at Indiana University and the board of directors of the Grocery Manufacturers of America and the National Collegiate Athletic Association.

Knauss also has a strong interest in baseball, being responsible for the controversial renaming of the Houston Astros' stadium after Minute Maid and campaigning to keep the Oakland Athletics in Oakland.
