= Gortzius Geldorp =

Flemish portrait painter

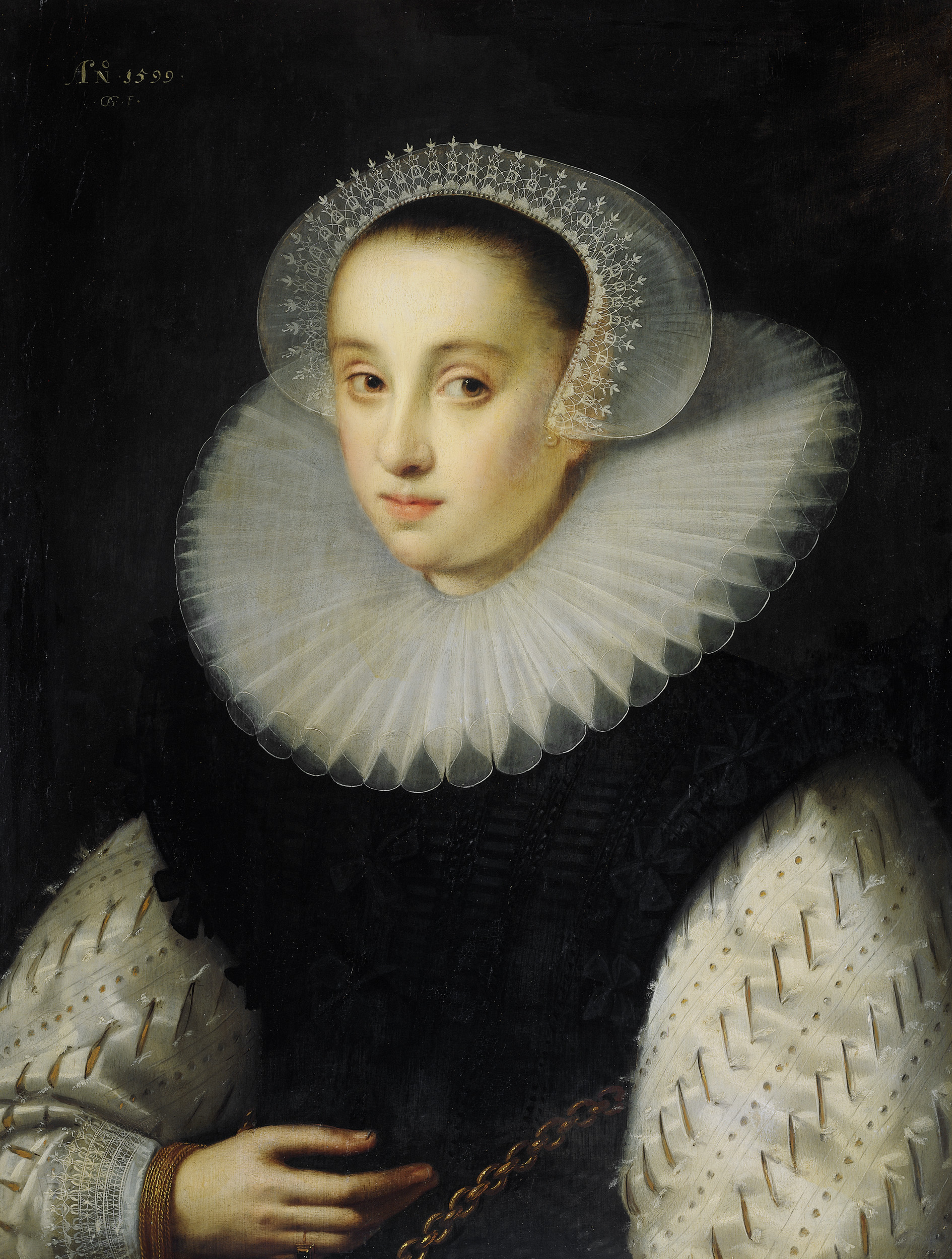
Hortensia del Prado - 1599 (Rijksmuseum)

Gortzius Geldorp (1553–1618) was a Flemish Renaissance artist who was active in Germany where he distinguished himself through his portrait paintings.

== Life ==
Gortzius Geldorp was born in Leuven. The early Flemish biographer Karel van Mander reported that Geldorp first learned to paint from Frans Francken I and later from Frans Pourbus the Elder. Frans Pourbus the Elder was a prominent portrait painter in Flanders. Frans Francken I and Frans Pourbus the Elder were both pupils of Frans Floris, the leading Renaissance painter in Antwerp.

Geldorp became court painter to the Duke of Terra Nova, Carlo d'Aragona Tagliavia, whom he accompanied on his trips. He travelled to Cologne with the Duke who was participating in peace negotiations with the Dutch Republic. Geldorp stayed in the city while remaining a companion of the Duke on his travels. In 1610 Geldorp took over the seat of Barthel Bruyn the Younger on the city council of Cologne. Geldorp was a successful portrait painter working for the aristocracy and other prominent patrons.

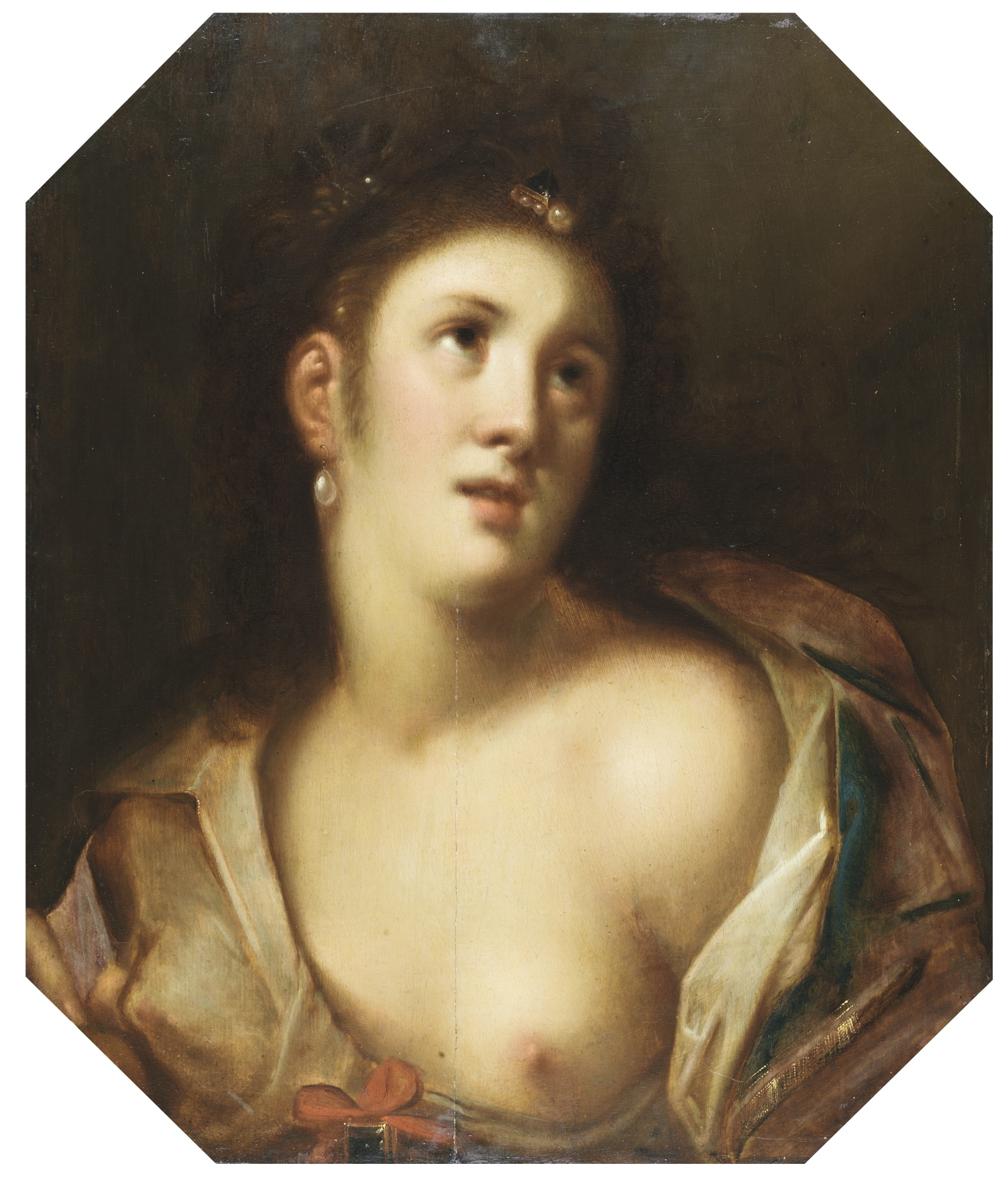
Venus, or a young woman en deshabillé

Gortzius Geldorp was appointed a representative of the Cologne painters' guild in Christmas of 1609, and he sat on the city council of Cologne in 1610 and again in 1613.

Geldorp died in Cologne, aged about 65. The painter Georg Geldorp who was mainly active in England was his son. The painter Melchior Geldorp who worked in Cologne was probably his son or nephew.

== Work ==
Geldorp was mainly a painter of individual and group portraits. Van Mander also mentions some history paintings such as a Diana, a Susanna, an Evangelist, the History of Esther and Ahasverus and two busts of Christ und Mary. These history paintings typically take the form of portrait-style depiction of a saint or a biblical or mythological figure. An example is the Venus, or a young woman en deshabillé (Sotheby's London sale of 2 May 2018 lot 27), which shows Venus in the form of a portrait of a semi-nude woman.

There are 70 known works by him which are mostly painted on panel. A series of nine family portraits are part of the collection of the Rijksmuseum, Amsterdam.

He had a brilliant and powerful palette in which the browns dominate. His later works are characterised by soft transitions and a blueish tone in the wrists and neck of his subjects.

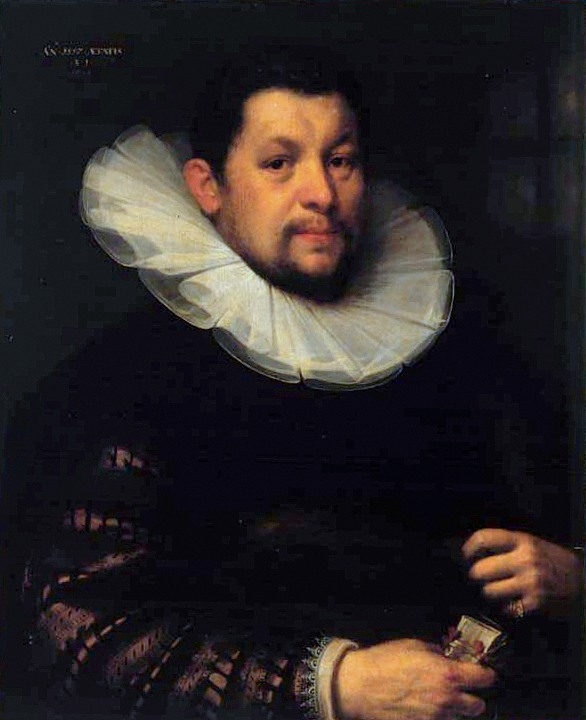
Portrait of a man

Some of his paintings were engraved by Crispijn van de Passe.
