= Salomon (given name) =

Salomon is a masculine given name. Bearers include:

- Salomon of Cornwall, a fifth century warrior prince
- Salomon, King of Brittany (died 874)
- Salomon II (died after 1809), Emperor of Ethiopia from 1777 to 1779
- Salomon April (born 1966), Namibian politician
- Salomon Gessner (1730–1788), Swiss painter, graphic artist, government official, newspaper publisher and poet
- Salomon Heine (1767–1844), Hanoverian merchant and banker in Hamburg
- Salomon Kalou (born 1985), Ivorian footballer
- Salomon Koninck (1609–1656), Dutch painter and engraver
- Salomón Libman (born 1984), Peruvian footballer
- Salomon Maimon (1753–1800), Lithuanian Jewish philosopher
- Salomon Mesdach (c. 1600–1632), Dutch painter
- Salomon Morel (1919–2007), Polish Jewish officer and commander of communist concentration camps, accused of war crimes and crimes against humanity
- Salomón Nazar (born 1953), Honduran retired football goalkeeper
- Salomon Olembé (born 1980), Cameroonian former footballer
- Salomon Oppenheim (1772–1828), German Jewish banker
- Salomón Rodríguez (born 2000), Uruguayan footballer
- Salomón Rondón (born 1989), Venezuelan footballer
- Salomon Mayer von Rothschild (1774–1855), German-born banker in the Austrian Empire, son of Mayer Amschel Rothschild
- Salomon van Ruysdael (c. 1602–1670), Dutch landscape painter
- Salomon Smolianoff (1899–1976), Russian Jewish counterfeiter and Holocaust survivor
- Salomón Solano (born 1985), Mexican gridiron football player

== See also ==
- Suleiman, a name, including a list of variants
