= Benno Dorer =

German businessperson

- Born: 1964 (age 61–62); Furtwangen im Schwarzwald, Germany
- Education: University of Freiburg; Saarland University
- Occupations: Chair and CEO, The Clorox Company
- Predecessor: Donald Knauss
- Board member of: VF Corporation, Grocery Manufacturers Association

Benno O. Dorer (born 1964) is a German businessperson. With the entirety of his career in the consumer goods industry, he has been the CEO and Chair of Clorox since November 2014 and August 2016, respectively. He began his career with Procter & Gamble, in 1990, then held a series of senior positions at Clorox, starting in 2005, then becoming CEO in 2014. An original signatory to the CEO Action for Diversity and inclusion pledge; Dorer was the highest-rated CEO in the United States in the Glassdoor 2017 Employees' Choice Awards. He serves on the board of directors of the VF Corporation, and is vice-chair of the Grocery Manufacturers Association.

In 2023, Dorer was listed as interim president and CEO of VF Corporation.

== Early life and education ==
Dorer was born in 1964, in Furtwangen im Schwarzwald. Growing up in the Black Forest of Germany, he sawed wood until the age of 14, and also worked for the Siedle company, during holidays. Dorer is multilingual, and graduated from the Otto-Hahn-Gymnasium in Furtwagenving to Freiburg, where he earned a degree in economics from the University of Freiburg, in 1986. He then earned a graduate degree in business administration from Saarland University, in 1990.

== Career ==
=== Procter & Gamble ===
Following his 1990 graduation from college, Dorer began his career at Procter & Gamble (P&G), where he held a number of executive positions in Germany over a five-year span, then, after 1995, worked out of Stockholm, Sweden, Brussels, Belgium, and Cincinnati, Ohio. At P&G, he also variously oversaw marketing for laundry, beauty and care, paper products, and home care, and led the marketing organization of the joint venture between Clorox and The Glad Products Company.

=== Clorox ===
In January 2005, he joined Clorox as vice-president and general manager of its Glad Products division. From March to October 2007, he was VP and general manager of the household division at Clorox, then was VP and general manager of the cleaning division, until June 2009, when he became the division's senior VP. In March 2011, he became the senior VP of Canada at Clorox, as well, holding the role until late 2012. On 1 January 2013, he was named Clorox's executive VP and CEO for cleaning, international units, and corporate strategy. During this time, Dorer and Clorox CEO Donald Knauss "worked closely together to lead the Clorox 2020 strategy," of cutting supply and operational costs while increasing personal care sales. Dorer also sought to stated he would focus the company on "markets with the highest profit potential."

Dorer became CEO of Clorox on November 20, 2014, succeeding Donald Knauss. While CEO, Dorer also became the Clorox chairman on August 15, 2016. As of 2016, Dorer reportedly owned approximately 27,000 Clorox shares then worth US$3.4 million, and his annual compensation that year amounted to $8.9 million. He remained CEO as of 2017, stating to media outlets that Clorox was continuing to focus on services such as online grocery shopping and e-commerce.

== Boards and memberships ==
Since 2017, Dorer has served on the board of VF Corporation. He is also vice-chair of the grocery Manufacturers Association (GMA). Dorer has advocated for diversity in business, emphasizing the business case and the significant roles of CEOs in furthering societal change, and was an original signatory to the CEO Action for Diversity and Inclusion pledge in 2017.

== Awards ==
Dorer was the highest-rated CEO in the United States in the Glassdoor 2017 Employees' Choice Awards, earning a 99 percent approval rating from employees. Sources attributed the ranking to management tactics that included transparency, emphasizing results, giving workers flexibility, and encouraging debate.

He was named among the Bay Area's Most Admired CEOs of 2017 by the San Francisco Business Times. The following year, Dorer was named to the junior Achievement Northern California Business hall of Fame and, in 2018, named as the Out & Equal CEO of the Year.

== Personal life ==
Dorer has resided in the Northern California Bay Area, since 2005.
