= Benno Frederick Toermer =

German painter

Benno Frederick Toermer (Törmer)
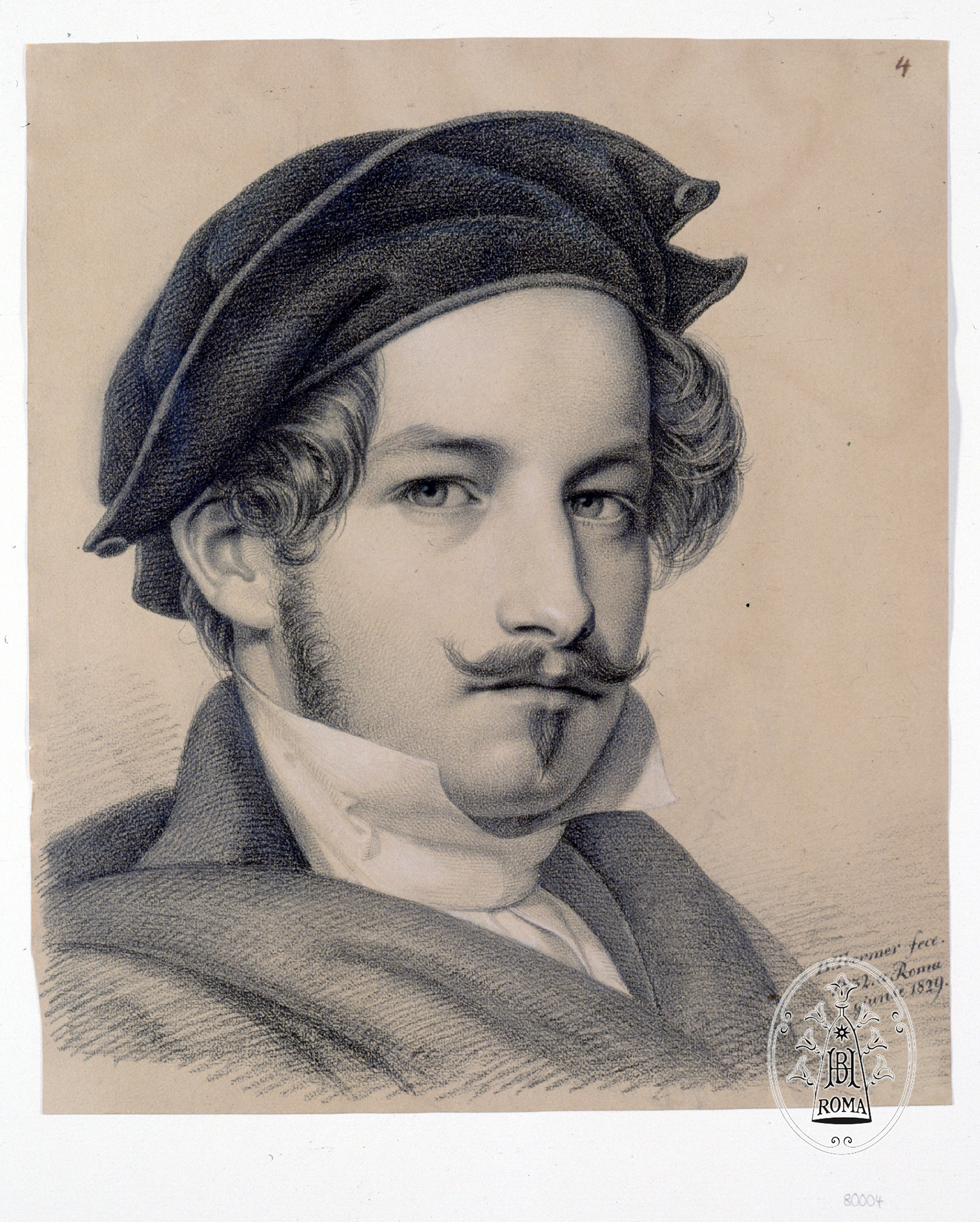
- Born: 4 July 1804; Dresden, Saxony, Germany
- Died: February 6, 1859 (aged 54); Rome, Italy
- Other names: Benno Friedrich Törmer, Benno Törmer, Benno F. Toermer, Benno Toermer, B. Toermer
- Occupation: Painter

Benno Frederick Toermer (Törmer), (4 July 1804 – 6 February 1859) was a painter. He was born and educated in Dresden, Saxony, in what is now Germany. He also studied and worked in Rome, Italy. Rome became his second home where he lived, with brief interruptions, until his death from a heart attack on 6 February 1859. While at the Academy in Dresden, Toermer painted religious and historical subjects, such as Joseph's interpreting dreams while in prison. When in Italy, his subjects were based on gods of legend and romantic motifs. Toermer often painted in the style of the old Dutch. In 1852, Toemer was invited to exhibit a work entitled “The Wedding Morning – Ill Omen” at the Royal Academy in London. He was an honorary member of the Patriotic Society of Natural History in Dresden. In July 1853, he was awarded the title of professor of Dresden by the Saxon Art Association.

== Biography ==
Benno Friedrich Törmer was born on 4 July 1804 in Dresden, the Borough of Neustadt, in current Germany. He was the second son of a Royal Saxon Captain and drawing teacher at the Dresden Engineering Academy. Törmer's nephew was the painter Hugo Törmer (1846-1902) of Loschwitz in Dresden.

Törmer wanted to be an artist at an early age, by the time he was 15 he had entered the Dresden Art Academy, studying under Karl Vogel von Vogelstein. While a student, he worked on the art in the Chapel and dining room at Pillnitz Castle, the summer home of electors and kings of Saxony.

In August 1829, he was awarded a fellowship for a two-year study in Italy. The fellowship was renewed for another three years. Rome became his second home where he became a Papal legate and later professor. He unexpectedly died in Rome from a heart attack on 6 February 1859.

== Works ==
- The Introduction (1829)
- Junge Italienerinnen an einem Brunnen bei Ariccia (1834) (Young Italian women at a fountain near Ariccia)
- The Music Lesson (1857) – has been on display at the Royal Picture Gallery in Dresden.
- Falcon Hunters with the Ladies—was purchased in 1839 by the Saxon Art Association
- Three images were reproduced by the Saxon Art Association,
  - "Lady at the Finery Table", engraved by A. Krueger,
  - "Rinaldo and Armida", engraved by E. Stölzel
  - "Overheard Nymphs Swim by Satyr", engraved by von Kluge.
- The Falconer, Berlin
- The Laurel Tribute, Rome
- Tempel des Antonius und der Faustina, Rome (1840) (Temple of the Antonius and the Faustina)
- Portrait of American author Julia Ward Howe (author of the Battle Hymn of the Republic ca. 1843)
- Ruins with Cannon and Soldiers (1849)
- Diana at her Bath, Rome (1852)
- Diana and her Nymphs
- La mort de l'oiseau (1852)(The Death of the Bird)
- Giving Alms to Poor (1854)
- Charity (1854)
