= Frans Pourbus the Elder =

Flemish painter (1545–1581)

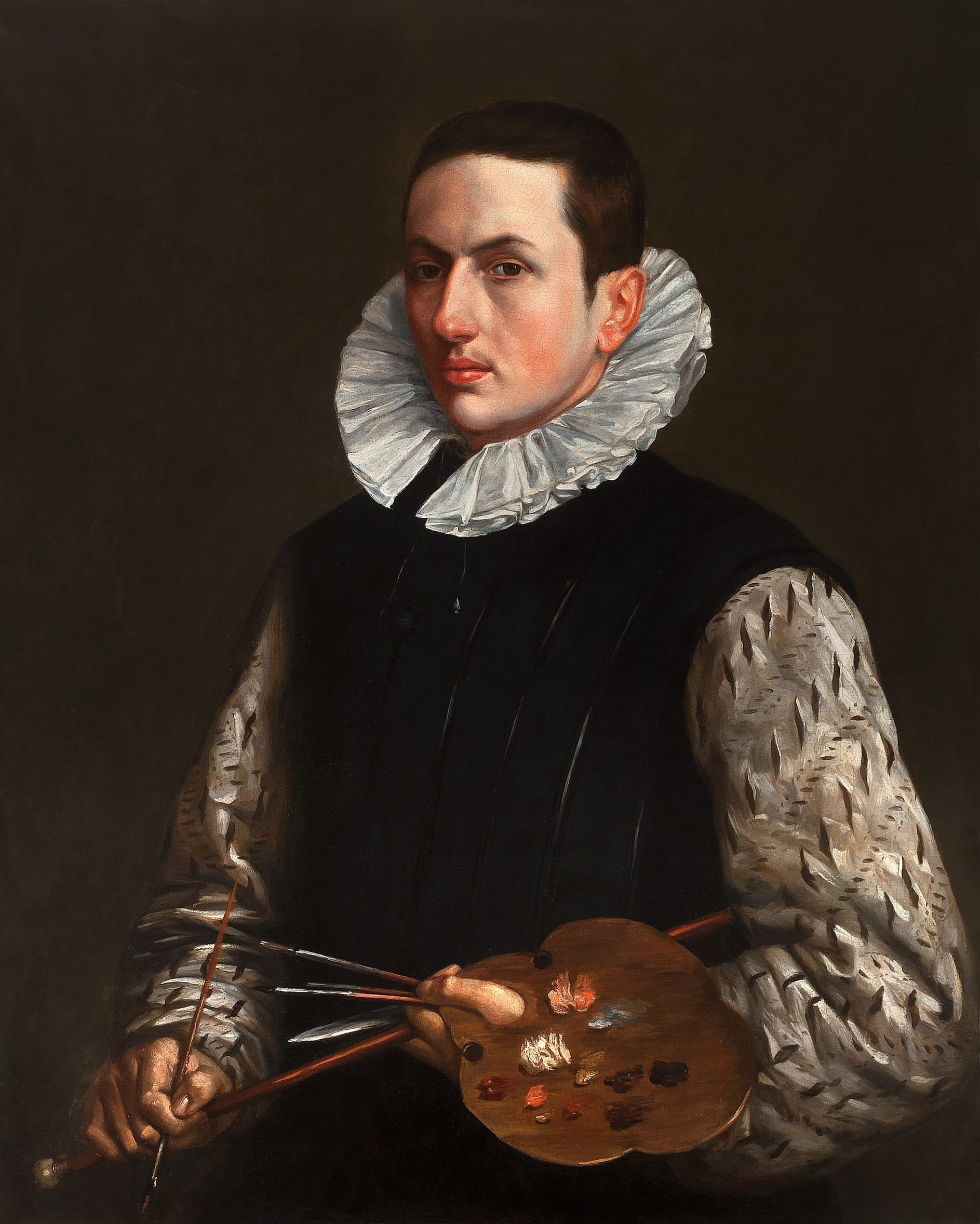
- Portrait of a man, possibly a self-portrait
- Born: 1545; Bruges, County of Flanders, Holy Roman Empire
- Died: 19 September 1581 (aged 35–36)
- Spouses: Suzanna Floris (m. 1566 – died 1578); Anna Mahieu (m. 1578)
- Children: Frans Pourbus the Younger
- Father: Pieter Pourbus

Frans Pourbus the Elder (Bruges, 1545 – Antwerp, 19 September 1581) was a Flemish Renaissance painter who is known primarily for his portraits and religious compositions, as well as a few genre scenes. He was the son of the prominent Bruges painter and cartographer Pieter Pourbus and the father of Frans Pourbus the Younger who became an international portraitist of the European ruling class.

== Life ==
Frans Pourbus was born in Bruges as the son of the prominent painter Pieter Pourbus. Pieter Pourbus was originally from Gouda and had moved with his family to Bruges at a very young age. Here he had made a career as a painter of portraits and religious compositions. The mother of Frans was Anna Blondeel, the daughter of Lancelot Blondeel (1498 – 4 March 1561), a prominent painter, architect, surveyor and cartographer active in Bruges. Frans started his training with his father who taught him to paint in the traditional Flemish style. The year he started to work in his father's workshop is not recorded. Around 1550, when he was only 15 years old, he became the chief assistant in the workshop.

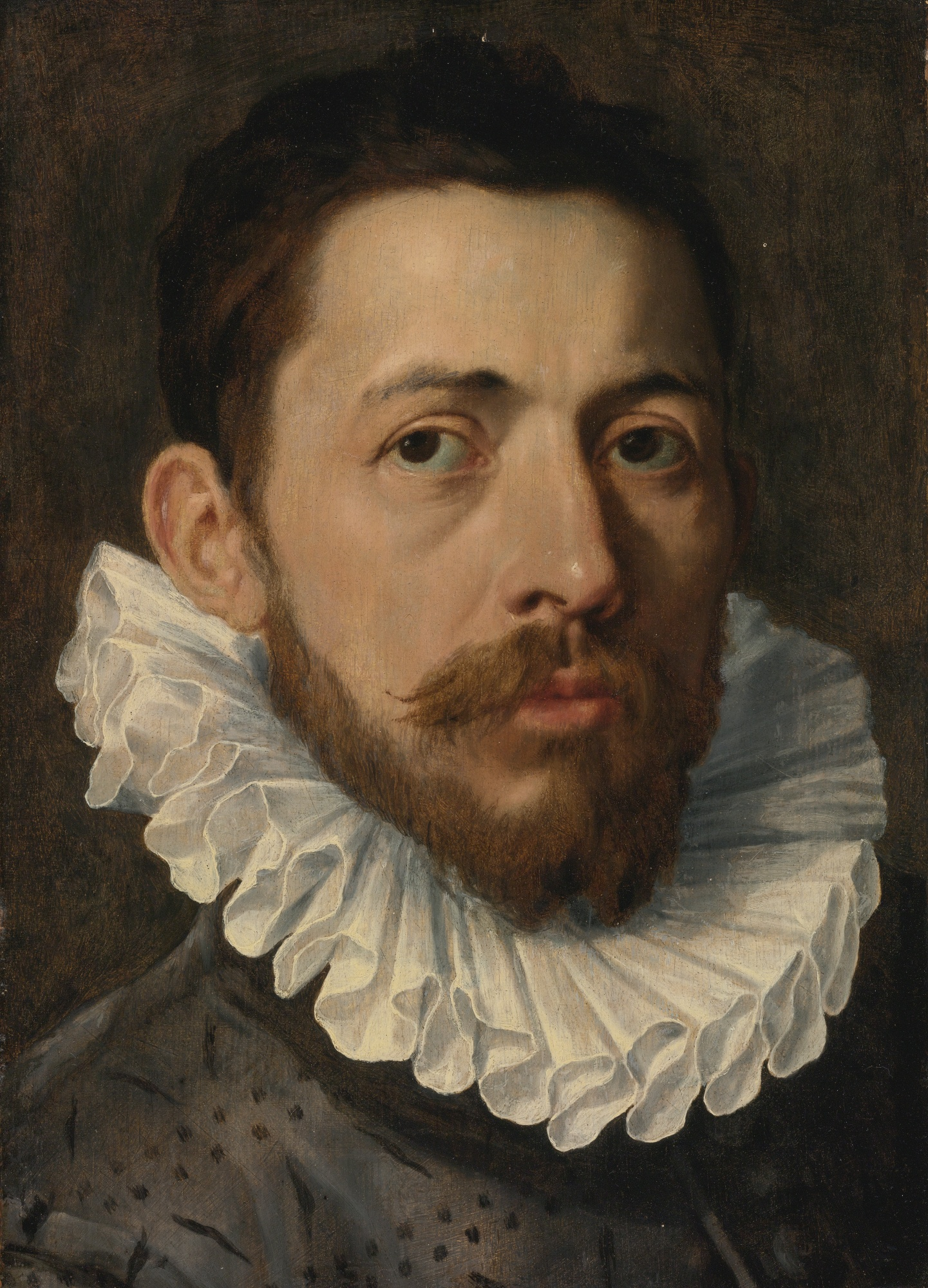
Portrait of a man

By 1564 the artist was registered as working in the workshop of Frans Floris in Antwerp. Frans Floris was mainly known for his history paintings and portraits. Floris played an important role in the movement in Northern Renaissance painting referred to as Romanism. The Romanists had typically travelled to Italy to study the works of leading Italian High Renaissance artists such as Michelangelo, Raphael and their followers. Their art assimilated these Italian influences into the Northern painting tradition. It is likely that Frans Pourbus' father knew Frans Floris personally and had sent his son to study with the leading Italianising painter in Flanders. Frans Floris soon recognised the talent of his new pupil and allowed him to complete his unfinished canvases. In the Floris workshop Pourbus acquired a more painterly style.

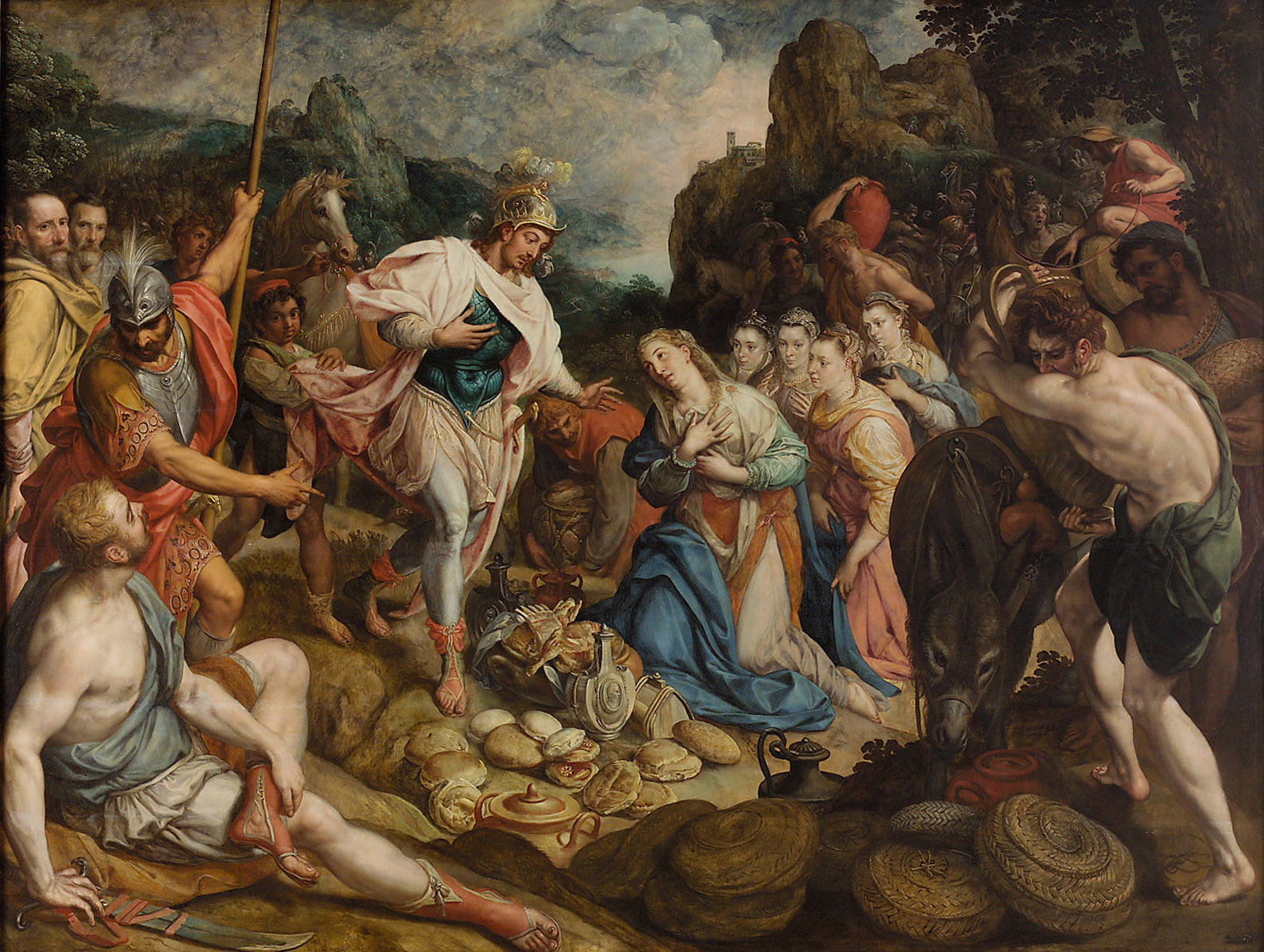
David and Abigail

According to the contemporary Flemish biographer Karel van Mander Pourbus intended to travel to Italy in 1566, a trip taken by many of his fellow artists at the time, but abandoned his plans after traveling from Antwerp to Ghent to visit the painter-poet Lucas de Heere. Karel van Mander was at the time a pupil of de Heere. Van Mander recounts that Pourbus clearly did not have his heart in his trip to Italy as he had lost it to the niece of his master. Pourbus travelled back to Antwerp where he married Suzanna Floris, the niece of his master Frans Floris and daughter of Cornelis Floris de Vriendt, a prominent sculptor and architect.

Pourbus and his wife had a son also named Frans in 1569. This son became a portrait painter with an international career and was known as Frans Pourbus the Younger. The couple had three more children of whom two died in childhood. In the year 1569 Frans Pourbus was registered as a master of the Guild of Saint Luke in Bruges as well as the Guild of Saint Luke in Antwerp. In 1572 Pourbus took on Rochtus Gabrelius da Bresson as a pupil and in 1575 Peeter Cobbe became his pupil. In 1572 Pourbus was contacted by the prominent portrait painter Anthonis Mor for assistance in finding apprentices in Antwerp. This may have resulted in closer contacts between the artists and an opportunity for Pourbus to become familiar with the work of Mor, then the leading portrait painter in the Low Countries. It has been suggested that his mature work shows the influence of Mor.

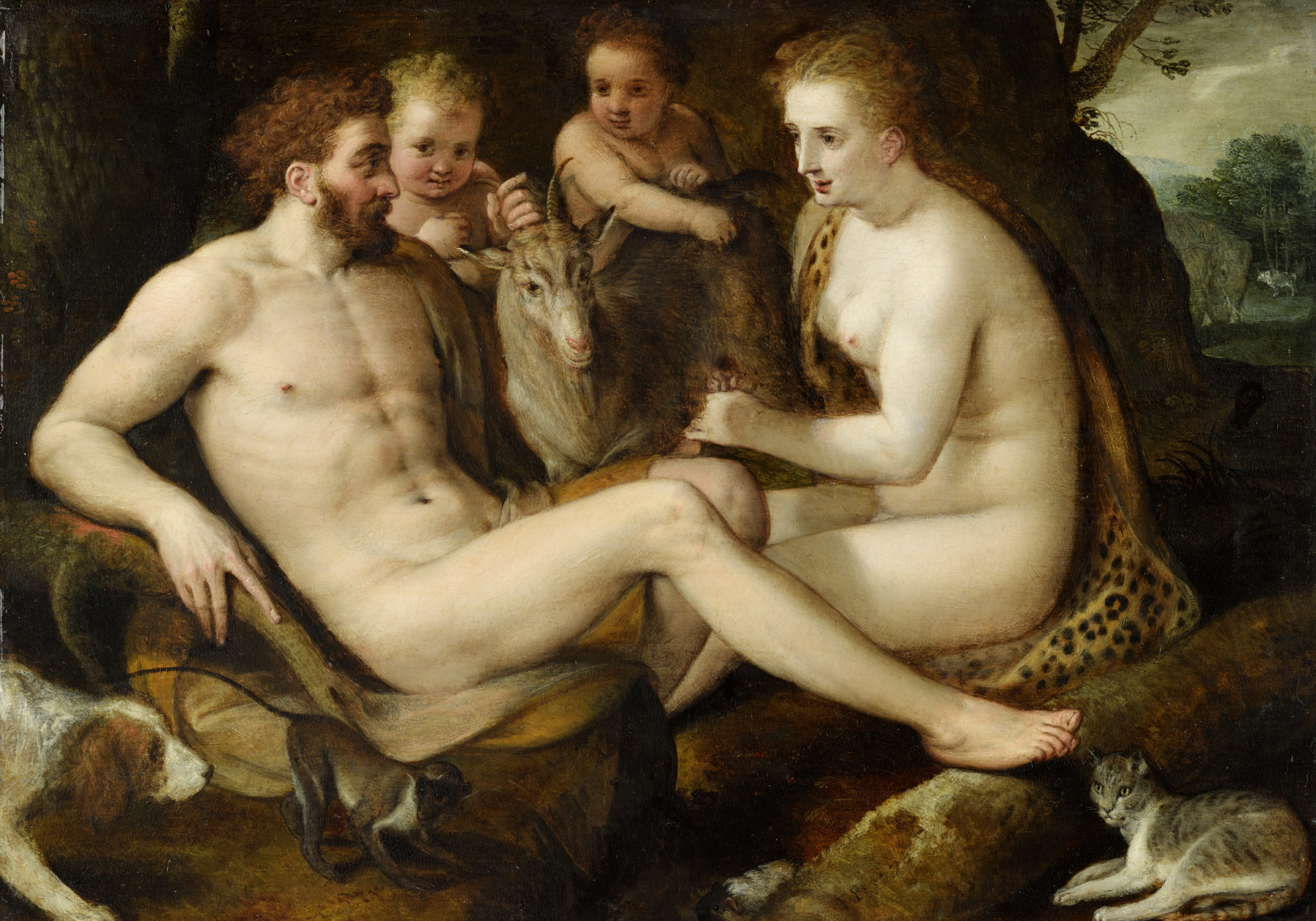
Adam and Eve with putti and a goat

Pourbus' wife died in 1578. The artist remarried Anna Mahieu, the daughter of the painter Jan Mahieu. They had a son who was called Moses, a name which confirms that they were Calvinists. This religious affiliation possibly explains why after 1577 he specialised increasingly in portraiture as Calvinists generally were opposed to religious paintings. Pourbus was a standard-bearer of the civil guard. He became critically ill during the performance of his civil guard duties. He caught typhoid fever by resting near a sewer pipe in the guardhouse where he was stationed. He died as a result on 19 September 1581. His father survived him. His widow married the painter Hans Jordaens the Elder.

In addition to Rochtus Gabrelius da Bresson and Peeter Cobbe, the pupils of Frans Pourbus included his son Frans and Gortzius Geldorp.

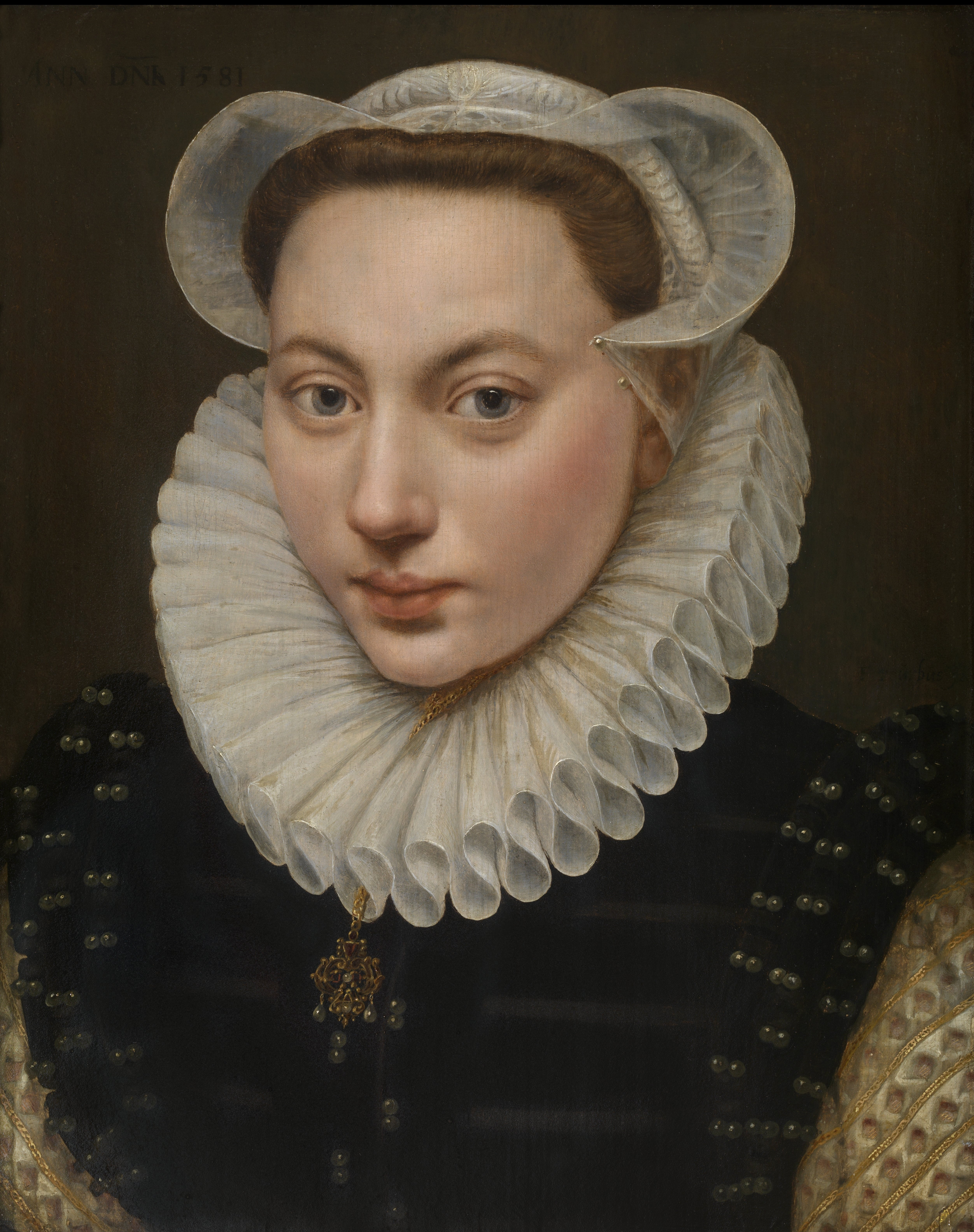
Portrait of a young woman

== Work ==
=== General ===
Frans Pourbus is known primarily for his religious and portrait paintings and to a lesser extent genre paintings. His portrait sitters were mainly from the rising mercantile class. He also painted a few genre scenes. Karel van Mander wrote that Pourbus was also particularly skilled in painting animals and trees after nature.

=== History paintings ===
Frans Pourbus received many commissions for religious compositions from patrons outside Antwerp. He painted 14 panels representing the History of Saint Andrew (1572) and a Triptych of Viglius Aytta (1571) for the St Bavo's Cathedral, Ghent.

In 1574 Frans Pourbus the Elder received an important commission from the Saint-Martin Abbey, Tournai to redecorate the choir of the abbey church after the damage caused by the Iconoclastic fury of the Beeldenstorm of 1566. He painted 17 works in three series: a series of the Passion of Christ, which was placed in the choir, a series of the Crucified Christ with the thieves, which was placed in the high altar while the pendants were integrated in the paneling above the choir stalls. The reverse sides of the panels depicting stories from the Life of Saint Martin were visible along the choir aisle.

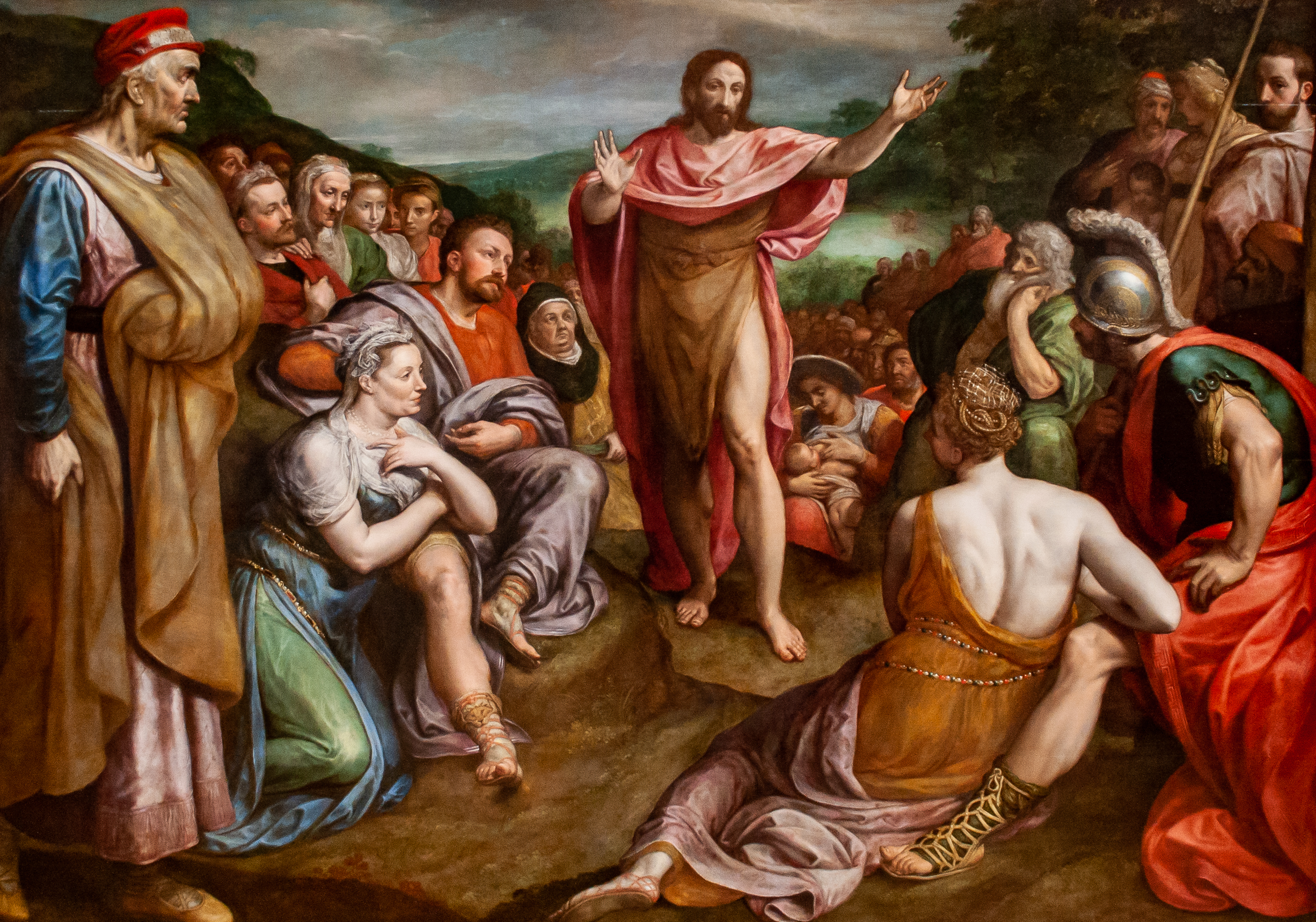
Saint John the Baptist Preaching

=== Portraits ===
During Pourbus' lifetime a number of portrait painters were active in the Habsburg Netherlands. Because of the similarities in style, the works of Pourbus and his near contemporaries Mor and Adriaen Thomasz. Key are regularly misattributed to each other.

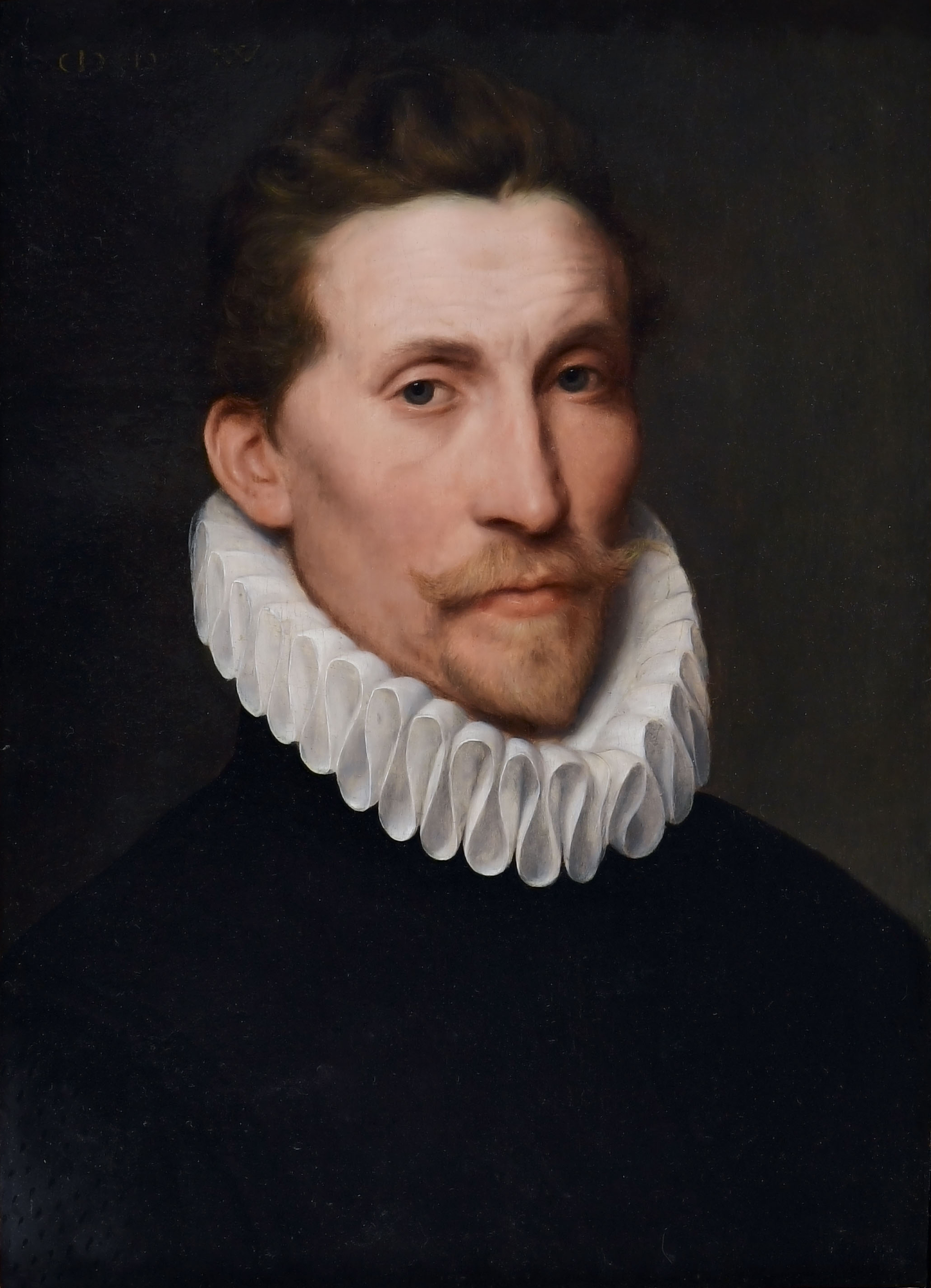
Portrait of an unknown man

Most of the sitters for Pourbus' portraits were from the rising middle class. He also painted portraits of the higher clergy, some local aristocrats and a few foreign dignitaries. Not many of the sitters have been identified with certainty. Works with identified sitters include the portrait of Viglius van Aytta, a Dutch statesman and jurist, and the portrait of Abraham Grapheus. There are some differences of view among art historians about the identification of some of the sitters.

In his portraits Frans Pourbus demonstrates an acute power of observation and psychological insight. This is evidenced in the Portrait of an unknown man (At Galerie Lowet de Wotrenge). The features of the man in this portrait are highly individualized through the subtle modelling of the face, flesh, cheekbones, nose and eyes. His neatly trimmed beard is rendered with remarkable precision and is set off by his closely concertinaed ruff. The sitter engages the viewer directly with his gaze and his slightly frowned brow gives him a contemplative aspect. The portrait demonstrates Pourbus' mastery in giving a psychological insight into his sitters. Pourbus' success as a portrait painter can probably also be attributed to his skill in depicting the accoutrements of wealth in his sitters.

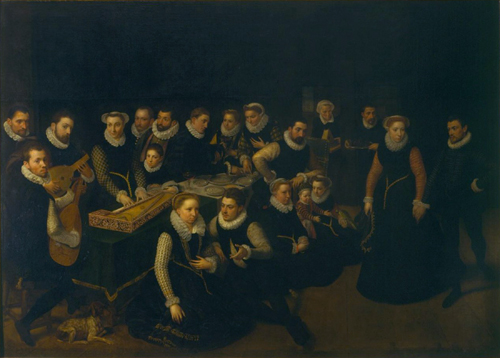
The Hoefnagel family

Pourbus also painted family portraits, of which at least two have been preserved. One represents the Hoefnagel family (c. 1580, Royal Museums of Fine Arts of Belgium). It shows the principal members of the prominent Antwerp family Hoefnagel, which included the prominent painter Joris Hoefnagel, around a table. The work is believed to represent the wedding of Balthasar Hoefnagel and Anna van Lieffelt. The family portrait was commissioned by Balthasar Hoefnagel (before 1554–1608), which explains the initials 'BH' near the spinet on the table. It is plausible that the family portrait is related to a marriage of Balthasar and Anna van Lieffelt, who can be recognized on the left of the panel as the bride and groom. For this occasion Balthasar also commissioned from Pourbus two additional portraits of himself and his wife, which were still unpaid to Pourbus at the time of his death, according to a record of his estate. The family portrait of the Hoefnagel family depicts twenty people in a genre-like composition arranged around a table. As far as the family composition can be determined at the time the painting was made, it can be deduced that Balthasar had three brothers: Joris, Melchior and Daniël and four sisters: Elizabeth, Margareta, Suzanna and Catharina. Suzanna is the girl with the parrot and the boy on her lap. Pourbus included on the left side a portrait of himself holding a lute in his hand. The elegant clothing of the family members expresses their important social status. The scene was painted in a soft style, which shows the influence of Frans Floris.

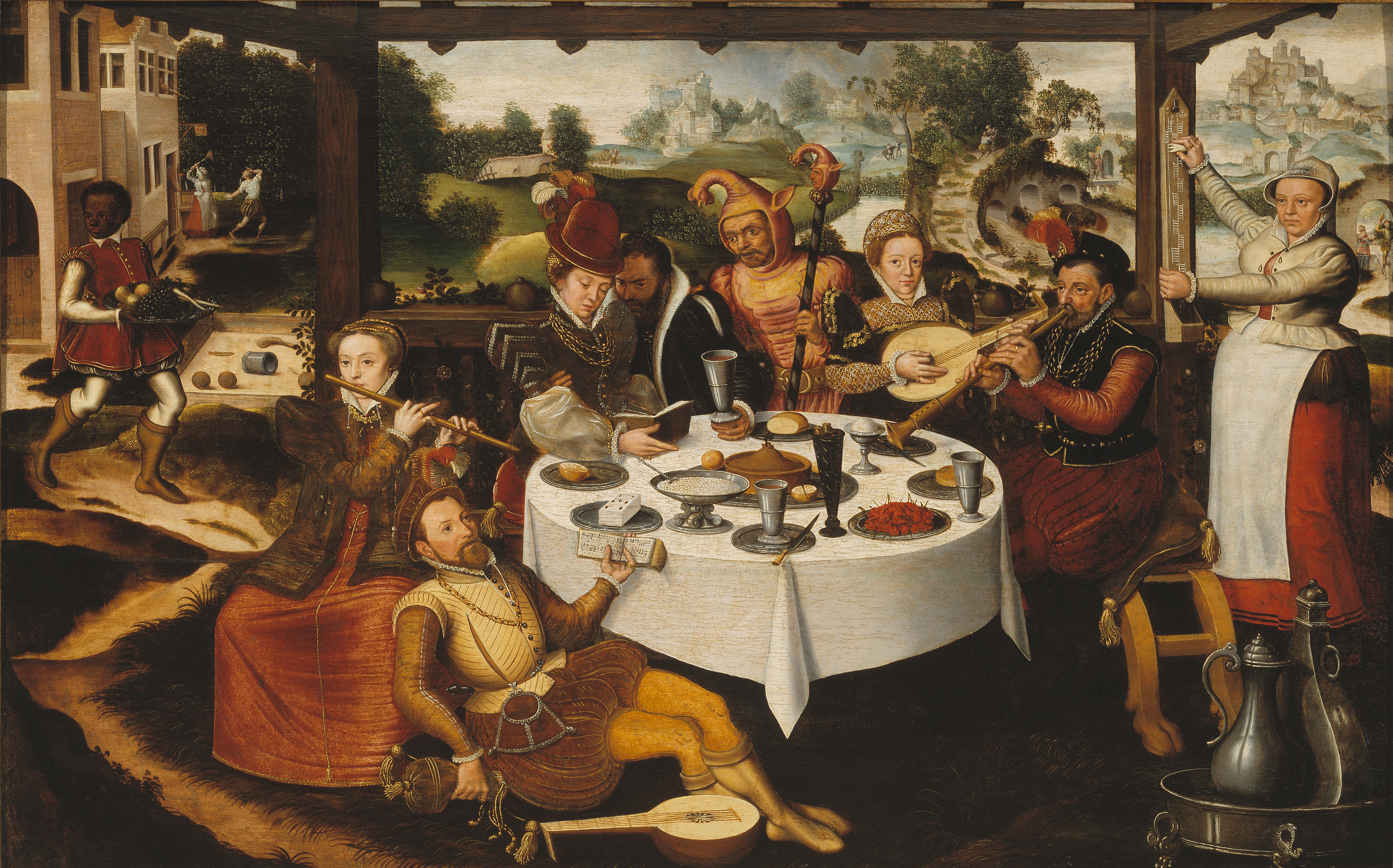
Prodigal son among courtesans

== Genre paintings ==
A few genre paintings have been attributed to Frans Pourbus. These paintings fall mainly in the genre of the so-called merry companies, which depict a small group of people enjoying themselves, usually seated with drinks, and often making music. The key work is the Prodigal son among courtesans (Museum Mayer van den Bergh). It depicts in the foreground an episode from the New Testament's Parable of the prodigal son in the form of a merry company, with the prodigal son enjoying wine, food, music, women and card playing with a group of companions. In the background we can see other episodes from the parable: the prodigal son being kicked out of his lodgings and eating pigswill and, on the bridge, the prodigal son on his knees reunited with his father. Pourbus' merry companies often depict people from the middle class enjoying an outdoor party rather than the lowly peasant scenes that were often the subject of this genre. A good example is the Merry company auctioned at Lempertz on 21 November 2009 (lot 1018B). The male and female participants in this composition are wearing clothes in the latest fashion such as high hats, puffed pants and ruff collars. They are enjoying themselves in the outdoors in a garden with plenty of food, drink, music and dance. The scene also includes a black page and a jester. The composition includes allusions to the aristocratic pursuit of hunting such as the dog in the foreground and the falcon on the right. Some couples on the right have separated themselves from the revelers at the table and their amorous intentions are all too clear.

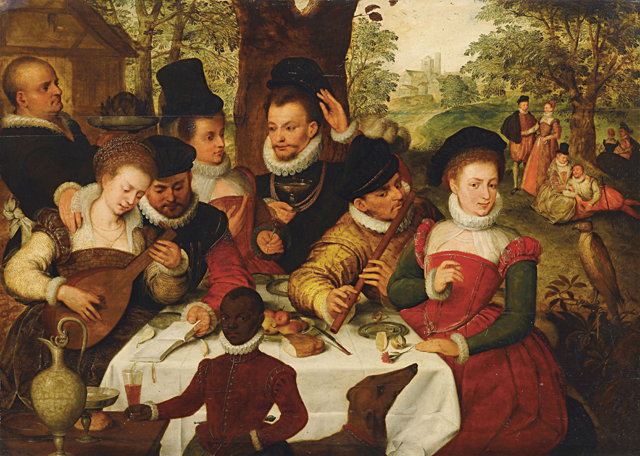
Merry company

In most cases the moralizing message of a 'buitenpartij' is to warn the viewers to distance themselves from the pleasures and excesses depicted, as these should be morally condemned as a frivolous waste of time and as worldly vanity. One of the origins of the type of the "buitenpartij" is the pictorial tradition of religious representations of a Biblical subject such as "The Prodigal Son", in which a moral story is told through depictions of drunken feasts with erotic overtones. It is possible that Pourbus also intended to convey such a religious or moralising message in his buitenpartijen.
