= Benno Werlen =

German geographer

Benno Werlen (born October 10, 1952, in Münster, Valais, Switzerland) is a Swiss geographer who is known for his action-centred approach to human geography and his concept of a Geography of Everyday Regionalisations. He has been the founder und holder of the UNESCO Chair on Global Understanding for Sustainability at the Friedrich Schiller University, Jena, since 2018. Until 2018 he held the chair for social geography at the same university. Werlen is a fellow of the World Academy of Art And Science—initiated by Albert Einstein—and the Max Weber Centre for Cultural and Social Studies (Erfurt), since 2019 an elected member of the Academia Europaea and from 2024 its chairperson for "Human Mobility, Governance, Environment and Space".

He is also the founder and chair of the IGU Commission on "Global Understanding", the initiator and executive director of the "2016 International Year of Global Understanding (IYGU)" including some 40 Regional Actions Centres, approved by the UNESCO General Conference, proclaimed by the three major science councils of the Human (CIPSH), Social (ISSC) and Natural Sciences (ICSU), and most recently the founder and chair of "The Jena Declaration on the Cultural and Regional Dimensions of Global Sustainability" (TDJ)". As a "key thinker on space and place" (Sage 2011) he is researching for decades the socio-space relationships, entering presently in the new world historical age of globalisation.

== Early life and education ==
After visiting the primary and secondary school in Münster, Valais he attended 1968–1973 the École Normal at Sion (Valais, Switzerland) before accomplishing a first university degree (1973–1976) in German and French Literature and Geography at the bilingual Université de Fribourg. (Switzerland). From 1976 to 1980 he studied Geography, Social and Cultural Anthropology, Sociology and Political Economy also in Fribourg. In 1980, he graduated with the "License" at faculty of the Humanities (Faculté des Lettres). Based on its dissertation, a critical examination of "Functionalism in Social Science and Geography" (summa cum laude), he was invited by Prof. Dietrich Bartels––a pioneer of the scientific spatial analysis––to work with him as scientific assistant at the Kiel University (Germany). After the sudden passing away of by Prof. Dietrich Bartels, Werlen graduated in 1985 from the Faculty of the Humanities (University of Fribourg) with a Ph.D. dissertation on "Action Centred Social Geography" (summa cum laude), moving then to University of Zurich. Before getting the venia legendi from the Faculty of Mathematics and Natural Sciences in 1993 with the habilitation thesis "Social Geography of Everyday Regionalisation" he worked at the Institute of Geography first as a research assistant and then as assistant professor (Oberassistent). From 1988 to 1998 he was a lecturer in geography at the Swiss Federal Institute of Technology, ETH Zurich.

== Institutional appointments ==
In 1996 he was nominated as associate professor on "Population and Social Geography" at the Friedrich Schiller University Jena (Germany), and in 1997 promoted to the chair of social geography. In 1995 he was a guest professor in human geography at University of Salzburg (Austria), from 2005 to 2006 a guest professor in human geography at University of Geneva, (Switzerland) from 2008 to 2015 a guest professor at Radboud University (Netherlands). From spring 1989 to fall 1990 he was a visiting scholar at the University of Cambridge (UK) and Member of High Table at King's College (UK) and Sidney Sussex College (UK), in fall 2000 a visiting scholar at the London School of Economics (LSE), (UK), and in spring 2001 a visiting scholar at the University of California in Los Angeles (UCLA), (US).

From 2008 to 2015, Werlen was a panel member of the European Research Council on "Environment and Society" for the most prestigious funding scheme "Advanced Grant", from 2008 to 2012 a member of the French Agence Nationale de la Recherche (ANR), for social sciences and the humanities, from 2004 to 2016 Chair of the Commission "Cultural Approach in Geography" of the International Geographical Union (IGU). In 2016 he has been appointed as a council member of the Taihu World Cultural Forum (China) and as chair of the IGU Commission "Global Understanding". He is also a member of the presidium at the United Nations Association of Germany for Central Germany.

Most recently—invited by UNEP in partnership with Joint Research Centre (JCR) of the European Commission and the International Science Council (ISC)—he was a participant of the Europe regional foresight workshop to establish an institutionalised approach to foresight and horizon scanning for future UN sustainability policies in respect of the preparation of the United Nations Summit of the Future 2024".

As co-editor in chief (together with Anthony Giddens) he founded the first open access journal (Copernicus Publications) in geography on "Social Geography" (2004–2013), since 2004 he is the editor of the book series Social Geographical Library (Sozialgeographische Bibliothek, Steiner Verlag), since 2016 the editor of the "SpringerBriefs in Global Understanding". Most recently he is the associate editor of "Frontiers in Sustainability – Sustainable Consumption" (Frontiers Media––Open Access Publisher).

== Theory Development: From Space to Action ==
On the basis of his critical analysis of functionalism, Werlen developed an action-theoretical approach to human geography from the early 1980s on. In his 1987 book Gesellschaft, Handlung und Raum, published in 1993 as Society, Action and Space, Werlen rejected – on the basis of his epistemological research in Critical Rationalism (Karl Popper) and Phenomenology (Edmund Husserl and Alfred Schutz)––the idea of human geography being a spatial science. Instead he argues in favour of treating space as an element of human actions as basis of everyday geography-making. With it, the focus of geographical research shifts from space to action.

In his most significant and influential contribution to German-speaking geography, the three-volume Sozialgeographie alltäglicher Regionalisierungen (S ocial Geography of Everyday Regionalisations), the concept of geography-making is further developed as practices of everyday regionalisation. But regionalization is not conceptualised in traditional sense as spatial delimitation at different scales (community, county, country etc.) nor just as ‘social regionalisation’ (Giddens's, Goffman) but as forms of relations to the world, as forms of world-binding under globalised conditions. Hereby different dimensions of these practices are distinguished, such as economic, normative, or communicative reals with the application of specific (non-reductible) concepts of space, such as metric, territorial, of significative like image.These distinctions also provide the basis for practice-centred approaches to economic, political, and cultural geography applied to different topical fields like the urban, population, transport, religion etc.

In the early 2010s, Werlen introduced the concept of "Societal Spatial Relationships" ("Gesellschaftliche Raumverhältnisse") into geographical theory and began to investigate questions of sustainability. Advancing the approach developed in his Social Geography of Everyday Regionalizations, Werlen argued for a historical use of practice-centred perspectives and proposed to investigate long-term change of the structural conditions of mastering spatial dimensions of geography-making as a basis of specific forms of societal realities established in revolutionary steps, such as Neolithic, Industrial and Digital Revolution. Each of them produces specific forms of societal realities. The current understanding of (modern) society is seen as strictly on the basis of modern geography-making replaced now by new societal spatial relationships as subject of research.

== Publications ==
Werlen's publications are dealing most generally with socio-space relationships under globalised conditions. He has so far published 17 books and more than 200 articles in scientific journals and edited volumes. Benno Werlen applied a specific focus to Epistemology, Methodology, and the (social) theoretical framework for action-centred and space-oriented research. His critically acclaimed book "Gesellschaft, Handlung und Raum" (Steiner 1987, 3rd ed. 1997) was translated into English as "Society, Action and Space: An Alternative Human Geography" (Routledge 1993, 2nd ed.). It was a study on the epistemological and theoretical founding of an action-centered geography and a "original and far-reaching theory that directs (...) towards new areas of research" (Society and Space 1994).

Through three volumes of the "Sozialgeographie alltäglicher Regionalisierungen" [Everyday Regionalizations] (Vol. 1: "Zur Ontologie von Gesellschaft und Raum" [Ontology of Society and Space], Werlen 1995, 2. Aufl. 1999; Vol. 2: "Globalisierung, Region und Regionalisierung" [Globalization, Region and Regionalization], Werlen 1997, 2. Aufl. 2007; Vol. 3: "Ausgangspunkte und Befunde empirischer Forschung" [Empirical Findings], Werlen 2007) Werlen further developed the action-centred theory, establishing a practice-centred approach that radicalised the research-based turn from space to action as everyday regionalizations and with the concept of "Weltbindung". With the two volumes on "Gesellschaftliche Räumlichkeit" [Societal Spatiality] he delivers a systematic overview of the geographical theory development and delivers the approach of ‘societal spatial relations’. This volume is most recently translated into Spanish (La Construcción de las Realidades Geográficas: Edition Universitaria. Santiago de Chile) and Portuguese (Espacialidade Social: Universidad de São Paulo University Press). The approach is applied later in the series "Knowledge and Space" to field of "Knowledge and Action" (co-edited with P. Meusburger 2017).

In 2015, Benno Werlen published the volume "Global Sustainability", which was sponsored by ICSU and published by Springer. Werlen argues for a stronger integration of the social and the natural sciences in sustainability research and introduces the concept of "global understanding" to sustainability science. Accordingly sustainable development requires a greater awareness and understanding of the global embeddedness of local living conditions, and a rejection of simplistic notions of science transforming its insights into society.

His publications have been translated in many languages, including English, French, Spanish, Portuguese, Russian and Korean.

== Critical Debates ==
Extended overviews on the debate of Werlen's theoretical work are documented extensively in several specific publications. The suggested change of paradigm from space to action provoked harsh criticism on a broad font. His Social Geography of Everyday Regionalisations sparked great debate in German-speaking human geography and beyond from the mid-1990s on. Despite criticism from within geography, his concept helped to pave the way for a cultural turn in German-speaking geography and to the spatial turn in the social sciences and humanities. In a national network analysis conducted in 2010 Werlen was found to be "by far the most widely cited German speaking Human Geographer in the 21st century" (Steinbrink et al. 2010, 20).

A point of criticism refers to the idealism of individualistic perspectives which leads to a neglect of structure and the associated constraints that come with an excessive emphasis on subjective intentions. Werlen recognized the limited explanatory power of action theory, which viewed social practice solely as a means of subjective intentions and rational choice. Consequently, through a praxis-theoretical approach, he demonstrated the possibility of interpreting social practices as routinized (Giddens) or habitualized (Bourdieu) processes, which can, thus, also reflect the non-reflective element of social practices.

An additional criticism is that Werlen's approach is far from the classical geographical themes, and therefore, his strengths (focus on the regional relationships, human-nature relationships, etc.), are easily achieved. In his responses to the criticism Werlen argues that his approach does not completely abandon the classical themes, rather he introduces a new perspective to approach them, analysing how social-cultural realities are constituted, reproduced and changed through everyday geography-making.

Werlen's social geography take on everyday regionalization "is now a keystone for debating the issues of space and environment in other disciplines as well as geography" (Lippuner 2011, 461). Werlen's work has also been recognised as "a milestone in the history of German geography, only to compare with such classics as Friedrich Ratzel and Alfred Hettner" (Sahr 1999, 43) and by Gerhard Hard (1999, 134) as a "revolution of the ontology of space”, Jürgen Ossenbrügge calls it "a revolution within geography" (Zeitschrift für Wirtschaftgeographie), Peter Weichhart "a fundamentally new way to think geographically" (Weichhart, 1999). Stephan Günzel qualifies his work on literaturkritik.de 2005 as "a Copernican revolution in the field of space, before the spatial turn was named". Neil Brenner sees in Tijdschrift voor Economische en Sociale Geografie (1998, 337–339) in "Werlen's concern to theorize globalisation in a agentic, phenomenological terms as (...) ‘geography-making’ (...) a neglected dimension of the globalisation process (...), an important and timely enterprise".

== Awards And Impact ==
In August 2016, at the International Geographical Congress (IGC) in Beijing, Werlen was awarded with the Lauréat d’Honneur of the International Geographical Union, the highest scientific honorary prize by the IGU, for his "lifelong contributions to geographical science, (...) as a distinguished, world known scholar, (...) (and his) outstanding contribution to the proclamation of the International Year of Global Understanding, opening up new paths of scientific cooperation at the highest level".

In the German speaking Human Geography world Werlen is seen as one of the most important reformers since the 1980s. Even critics of his work within the geographical discipline honoured this achievement. Overall, Werlens's work is contributing substantially to establishing German-speaking geography as a "Leitwissenschaft" [leading science] (Bachmann-Medick 2006, 392) with regard to the thematization of space in social practice.

== Selected Bibliography ==
- WERLEN, B. (1987): Gesellschaft, Handlung und Raum. Grundlagen handlungstheoretischer Sozialgeographie. Stuttgart: Franz Steiner Verlag.
- WERLEN, B. (1993): Society, Action and Space. An Alternative Human Geography. With a Preface by Anthony Giddens. London: Routledge.
- WERLEN, B. (1995): Sozialgeographie alltäglicher Regionalisierungen, Bd. 1: Zur Ontologie von Gesellschaft und Raum. Stuttgart: Franz Steiner Verlag. (Social Geography of Everyday Regionalizations, Vol. 1: On the Ontology of Society and Space)
- WERLEN, B. (1997): Sozialgeographie alltäglicher Regionalisierungen, Bd. 2: Globalisierung, Region und Regionalisierung. Stuttgart: Franz Steiner Verlag. (Social Geography of Everyday Regionalizations. Vol. 2: Globalization, Region and Regionalization)
- WERLEN, B. (2000): Sozialgeographie. Eine Einführung. Bern: UTB Haupt. (Social Geography. An Introduction)
- WERLEN, B. (ed.) (2008): Sozialgeographie alltäglicher Regionalisierungen Bd. 3: Empirische Befunde. Stuttgart: Franz Steiner Verlag. (Social Geography of Everyday Regionalizations. Vol. 3: Everyday Geographies–Empircal Studies)
- WERLEN, B. (2010): Gesellschaftliche Räumlichkeit. Bd. 1: Orte der Geographie. Stuttgart: Franz Steiner Verlag. (Places of Geography. Collected Papers. Vol. 1)
- WERLEN, B. (2010): Gesellschaftliche Räumlichkeit. Bd. 2: Konstruktion geographischer Wirklichkeiten. Stuttgart: Franz Steiner Verlag. (Construction of Geographical Realities. Collected Papers. Vol. 2)
- WERLEN, B. (ed.) (2015): Global Sustainability, Cultural Perspectives and Challenges for Transdisciplinary Integrated Research. Dordrecht: Springer Publishers.
- MEUSBURGER, P. & B. WERLEN (eds.) (2017): Knowledge and Action. Dordrecht: Springer Publishers.
- WERLEN, B. (2022): La Construcción de las Realidades Geográficas. Una geografía de la acción. Santiago de Chile: Edition Universitaria.
- WERLEN, B. (2024): Espacialidade Social. Universidad de São Paulo São Paulo: University Press.
