= Salomon Mesdach =

Dutch Golden Age painter

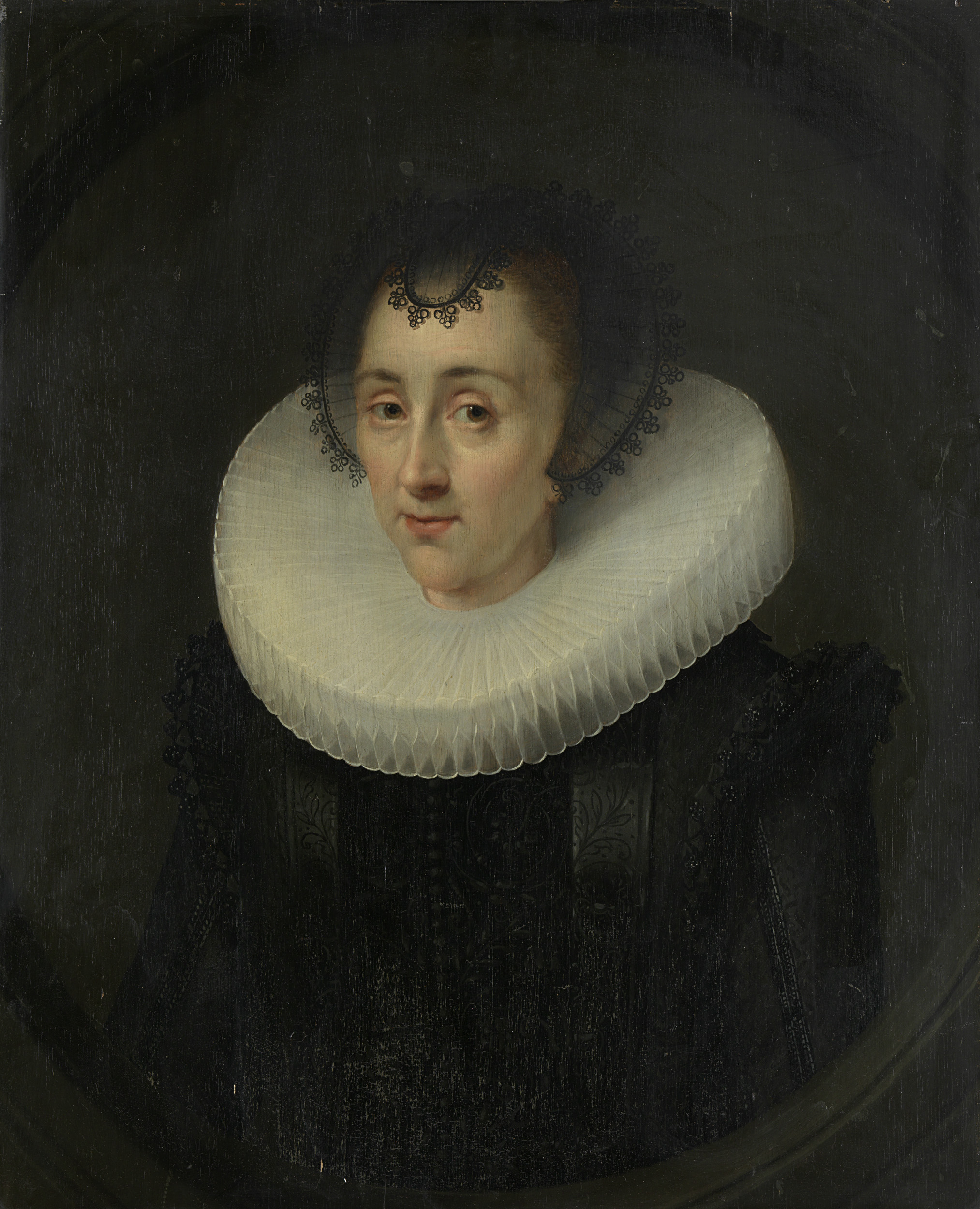
Hortensia del Prado c.1625 (Rijksmuseum)

Salomon Mesdach (c. 1600 – 1632), was a Dutch Golden Age painter.

== Biography ==
Salomon lived and worked in Middelburg, where he is known for portraits. Some of his portraits were later engraved.
