= Frithjof Sælen =

Frithjof Sælen may refer to:

- Frithjof Sælen (gymnast) (1892–1975), Norwegian gymnast
- Frithjof Sælen (writer) (1917–2004), Norwegian writer, son of the former
