= Jacob Cats =

Dutch poet, humorist, jurist and politician (1577–1660)

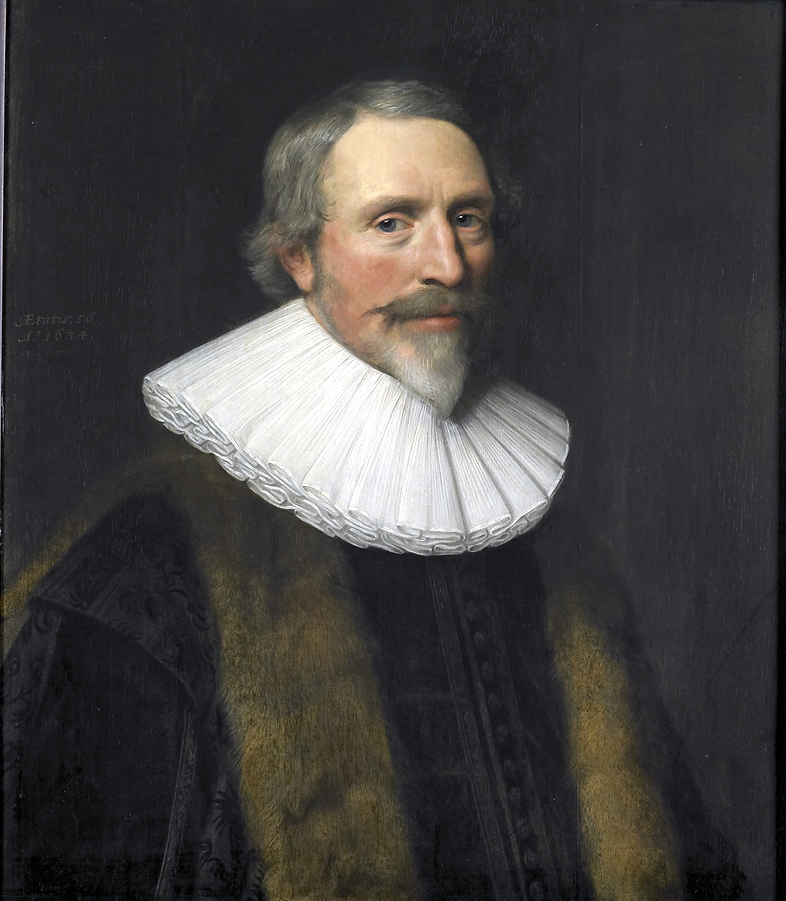
- 1634 portrait
- Born: 10 November 1577; Brouwershaven, Spanish Netherlands
- Died: 12 September 1660 (aged 82); The Hague, Dutch Republic
- Education: Law
- Occupations: Poet, writer, politician
- Spouse: Elisabeth van Valckenburg
- Writing career
- Period: Dutch Golden Age
- Genre: Emblem books
- Notable work: Het Spaens Heydinnetje

Grand Pensionary of Holland
- In office 1636–1651
- Preceded by: Adriaan Pauw
- Succeeded by: Adriaan Pauw
- In office 1629–1631
- Preceded by: Anthonie Duyck
- Succeeded by: Adriaan Pauw

Signature
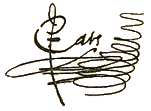

Jacob Cats (10 November 1577 – 12 September 1660) was a Dutch poet, humorist, jurist and politician. He is most famous for his emblem books.

== Early years ==
Jacob Cats was born on 10 November 1577 in Brouwershaven. Having lost his mother at an early age, he and his three brothers were adopted by his aunt Anna Breyde, sister of his mother and his uncle Doen Leenaerts. Cats was sent to school in Breda. He then studied law in Rotterdam and Paris, and, returning to Holland, he settled in The Hague, where he began to practice as a lawyer. His pleading in defense of a person accused of witchcraft brought him many clients and some reputation. He had a serious engagement about this time, which was broken off on the very eve of marriage by his catching a tertian fever (a form of malaria) which defied all attempts at cure for some two years. For medical advice and change of air Cats went to England, where he consulted the highest authorities in vain. He returned to Zeeland to die, but was cured mysteriously with the powder of a travelling doctor (later sources claim he was a quack). He married on 26 April 1605 a lady of some wealth, Elisabeth van Valckenburg, and thenceforward lived at Grijpskerke in Zeeland, where he devoted himself to farming and poetry.

== Diplomatic career ==
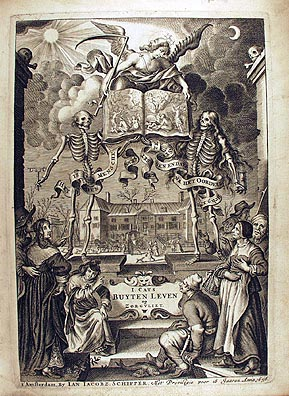
Landgoed Sorghvliet

In 1621, on the expiration of the twelve-year truce with Spain, the breaking of the dykes drove him from his farm. He was made pensionary (stipendiary magistrate) of Middelburg; and two years afterwards of Dordrecht. In 1627 Cats came to England on a mission to Charles I, who made him a knight. In 1636 he was made Grand Pensionary of Holland, and in 1648 keeper of the great seal; in 1651 he resigned his offices. Cats held this office for 15 years, but without putting his stamp on it. Cats turned out to be a rather colorless statesman. During his tenure, Andries Bicker and his cousin Cornelis de Graeff of Amsterdam took over the leadership of the republican-leaning Dutch regents. In 1657 he was sent a second time to England on what proved to be an unsuccessful mission to Oliver Cromwell.

== Poetry ==
Cats retired to the seclusion of his palatial villa "Sorghvliet" ("Fly From Worry"), which was surrounded by a vast and sumptuous formal garden; the garden (now a park) became internationally famous and featured in 17th-century collections of engravings of famous European gardens. (Located near the Hague, and now known as "Catshuis", the house has survived and is now the official residence of the Dutch Prime Minister). Here he lived from this time until his death, occupied in the composition of his autobiography (Eighty-two Years of My Life, first printed at Leiden in 1734) and of his poems. He became famous in his own lifetime from his moralistic Emblem books, most notably Sinne en Minnebeelden, for which Adrian van der Venne cut the plates. He died on 12 September 1660, and was buried by torchlight, and with great ceremony, in the Kloosterkerk at the Hague. He is still spoken of as "Father Cats" by his countrymen.

Cats was contemporary with Hooft and Vondel and other distinguished Dutch writers in the golden age of Dutch literature, but his Orangist and Calvinistic opinions separated him from the liberal school of Amsterdam poets. He was, however, intimate with Constantijn Huygens, whose political opinions were more nearly in agreement with his own. Although hardly known outside of Holland, among his own people for nearly two centuries he enjoyed an enormous popularity – the complete collection of his poems is said to have sold around 50,000 copies, and was reputedly the only book, other than the Bible, to be found in many Dutch homes. His diffuseness and the antiquated character of his matter and diction, have, however, come to be regarded as difficulties in the way of study, and he is more renowned than read. A statue to him was erected at Brouwershaven in 1829.

== Works ==
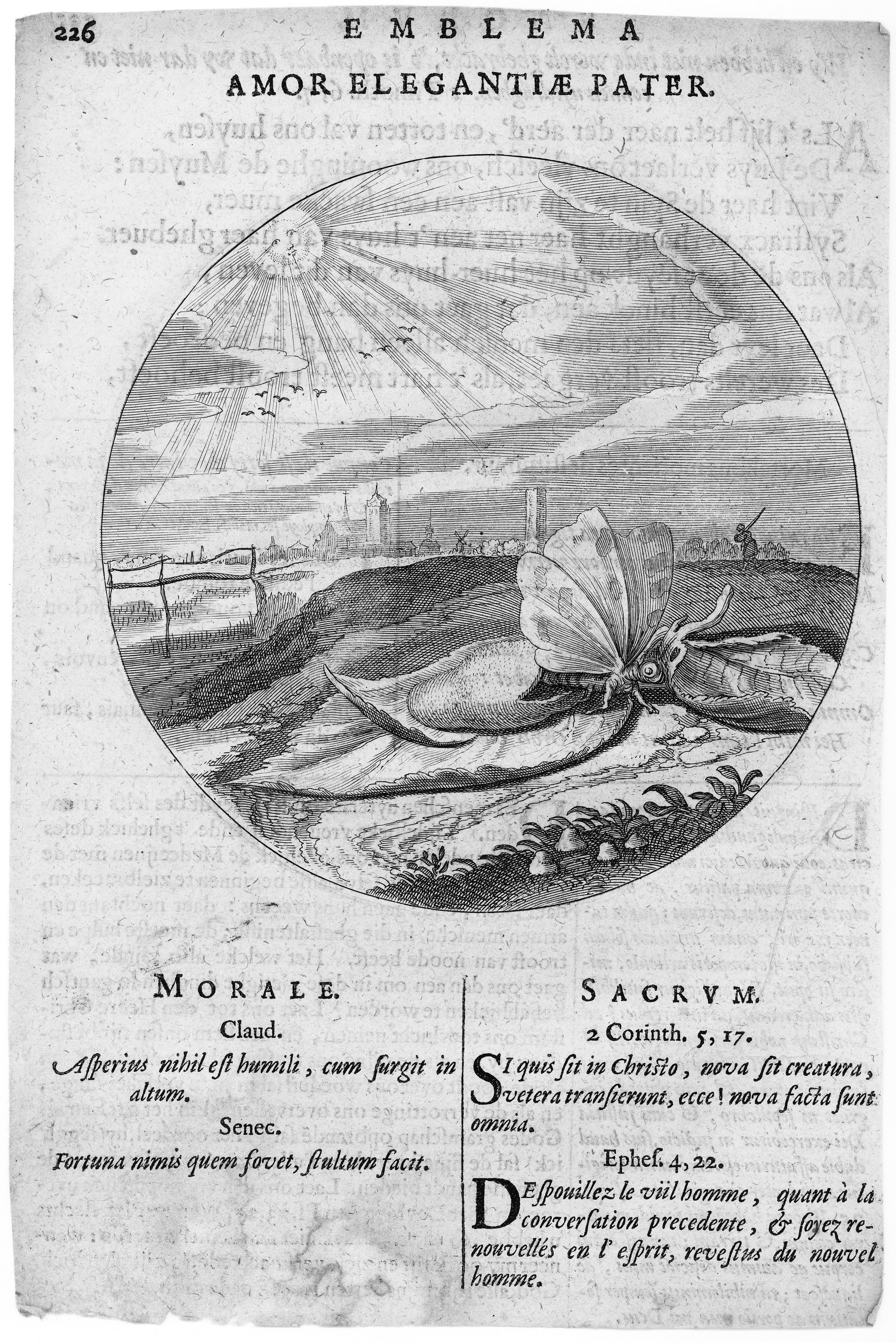
Emblem from Cats' Monita amoris virginei (1620)

See Jacob Cats, Alle de wercken, so ouden als nieuwe (complete works, old and new), published by Jan Jacobsz. Schipper, Amsterdam 1655, or: Jacob Cats, Complete works (1790–1800, 19 vols.), later editions by van Vloten (Zwolle, 1858–1866; and at Schiedam, 1869–1870): Pigott, Moral Emblems, with Aphorisms, etc., from Jacob Cats (1860); and P. C. Witsen Geijsbeek, Het Leven en de Verdiensten van Jacob Cats (1829). Southey has a very complimentary reference to Cats in his Epistle to Allan Cunningham.

- Emblemata or Minnebeelden with Maegdenplicht (1618)
- Selfstryt (1620)
- Houwelick (1625)
- Proteus Ofte Minne-Beelden Verandert In Sinne-Beelden. (1627)
- Spiegel van den ouden en nieuwen Tyt (1632)
- Ouderdom, Buytenleven en Hofgedachten op Sorgvliet (1664)
- Gedachten op slapelooze nachten (1661)

His work Houwelick features the garden of his neighbour Hortensia del Prado.

== Legacy ==
Cats' moralistic poems were told and retold like nursery rhymes over several generations. Even today many of his coined phrases are still colloquialisms in everyday Dutch.

Many of Cats' moral poems were set to music. A selection of these, Klagende Maeghden en andere liederen, was recorded in 2008 by the Utrecht ensemble Camerata Trajectina.

A copper statue of him is displayed in the market of his birth town Brouwershaven, the original sandstone one was removed due to damage and is on display in the town's church.

Political offices
Preceded by Anthonie Duyck	Grand Pensionary of Holland; 1629–1631	Succeeded by Adriaan Pauw
Preceded by Adriaan Pauw	Grand Pensionary of Holland; 1636–1651	Succeeded by Adriaan Pauw
