= Benno Saelens =

Belgian volleyball player (born 1948)

Personal information
- Nationality: Belgian
- Born: 11 January 1948 (age 77); Menen, Belgium

Sport
- Sport: Volleyball

Benno Saelens (born 11 January 1948) is a Belgian volleyball player. He competed in the men's tournament at the 1968 Summer Olympics.
