= Benedikt Kögl =

German painter

Benedikt Kögl, otherwise Benno Kögl (12 March 1892, Greding – 29 April 1973, Munich) was a German painter. He was principally a miniaturist working in oil; his main subjects were still lifes and cats (from which he gained the nickname Katzen-Kögl or 'Cat Kögl'). Some of his works are less than one inch square. He was a student of Hans von Hayek (1869-1940) and Philipp Röth (1841-1921).

His work is actively traded today in several galleries in the US and Germany.

== Works ==
Examples of his work can be found here:

- Great Cat Paintings
- Askart.com
- Galerien-Adelhoch.com
- Invaluable.co.uk
