= Max Stern Art Restitution Project =

Effort to locate lost artworks by Max Stern

The Max Stern Art Restitution Project was initiated as an effort to locate artworks lost by Dr. Max Stern during World War II.

== Background information ==
Max Stern was a world-renowned art collector and gallery owner who died in 1987. During World War II, Stern was forced to flee the Nazi regime and relocate to Britain and then to Canada. While escaping, he lost his private collection of valued artworks through forced sale and confiscation. After the war, Stern sought restitution of these works. Unfortunately, he had limited success and only managed to recover several pieces. The majority of his property was never returned.

== The project ==
The Max Stern Art Restitution Project was established by the executors and university beneficiaries of the Max Stern Estate. An official announcement outlining the initiation of the project and its goals was made on April 28, 2005. This announcement occurred in Quebec, and was given by Dr. Clarence Epstein of Concordia University. The project is seeking the restitution of art pieces originally owned by the late Max Stern. These pieces were either confiscated by the Nazi Party, or sold under duress in the 1930s. While project members realize that locating missing artwork is a great challenge, they decided that the moral and financial imperatives surrounding the cause make it worth the effort.

Concordia University has been a leader in the restitution movement, and is working closely with the Art Loss Register in London, the Commission of Looted Art in Europe, and the New York State Holocaust Claims Processing Office. Since Concordia launched its efforts, 250 artworks previously owned by Stern have been identified. These include pieces by Brueghel, Bosch, Carracci and Winterhalter. Five works have been located in the United States, England, the Netherlands or Germany. As artworks are reclaimed and possession is acquired, estate executors plan to loan the pieces to museums and galleries. This decision was made based on Max Stern's ideals, as he was always encouraging art education and passion in Canada and around the world. Executors and beneficiaries have expressed their wish to avoid using the courts, and instead wish to utilize moral persuasion in convincing institutions and individuals to return works to the appropriate beneficiaries.

The Max Stern Art Restitution Project was not initiated only to find missing works. Rather, it was also created as an incentive to motivate governments, museums, collectors and the art trade towards resolving injustices caused by Nazi cultural policies. In order to commence this movement, the restitution project chose to spearhead the Auktion 392 exhibit.

== Auktion 392 ==
Launched in fall of 2006, Auktion 392 is a traveling exhibit surrounding the forced sale of Stern paintings in the Lempertz auction house during 1937. This exhibit was created by FOFA gallery coordinator Lynn Beavis and designer Andrew Elvish. It also accompanies the seminal research of Professor Catherine MacKenzie and MA students from Concordia's Department of Art History. The exhibition outlines the unique story of Max Stern, and the legal issues of art restitution stemming from anti-Semitic policies during World War II. There is historical meaning behind the name of this exhibit. In 1935, after Stern had his art trading license withdrawn, he was forced to sell his artworks under extreme duress. The sale was arranged by Lempertz auctioneers in Cologne, and the auction was titled Auktion 392. This exhibit is extremely valuable to the Max Stern Art Restitution Project, as it raises public awareness of art restitution matters.

== Issues in restitution ==
Recovering the missing artwork has been no simple task. There have been several instances where pieces have been located, but a lack of cooperation keeps the works from being acquired. Take, for example, the issue surrounding two artworks originally sold under duress by Stern. The two paintings, Market Scene in the Piazza Navona and Market Scene in the Piazza del Quirinale, were created by a Dutch Baroque painter named Mathijs Naiveu. These paintings were discovered while being auctioned in the Van Ham auction house, which is located in Cologne. On November 8, 2006, it was requested that the artworks be removed from the upcoming auction. The Stern Estate had been pursuing the paintings for several years, ever since the possessor tried to sell them in Amsterdam. Unfortunately, the German possessor refused to acknowledge the forced sale that took place during the Nazi era. Consequently, the Van Ham sale was scheduled to proceed despite the tainted history.

In order to be reclaimed, each discovered artwork has to run through a legal process which varies depending on its located country. Some pieces present extreme challenges, like the Neufchatel portrait of Jan van Eversdijck. Upon discovery, this portrait was deemed part of the patrimony of the Illes Beleares province in Spain. This patrimony made difficult for project members to claim their right of ownership. Fortunately, the painting has since been restituted and is one of the 11 paintings reclaimed by the Max Stern Art Restitution Project. This particular portrait was easy to locate because it was posted on a museum website up until 2006. Other paintings are much more difficult to find. This difficulty stems from the fact that a large number of Stern's stock was not illustrated, and few of the given titles were likely to have remained over the years. Unfortunately, art galleries and auction houses are not required to provide background information on works of art in their possession. Dealers will often be in possession of the full story behind a specific painting, but choose to suppress this information for business reasons.

Research conducted has learned that upwards of forty paintings originally owned by Stern have since been re-offered on the market in the last two decades, usually through major auction houses in Germany. The Stern Estate continues to plead with German auction houses, hoping to make them recognize the validity of the estate's ownership regarding looted artworks.

== Works recovered by the project ==
While facing a lot of difficulty in their endeavor to locate the missing Stern paintings, the Max Stern Art Restitution Project has also been presented with several victories. To date, they have managed to recover the following works:

- Scandinavian Landscape by Andreas Achanbach – Restituted October 2013
- Virgin and Child by Master of Flemalle – Restituted March 2013
- The Masters of the Goldsmith Guild in Amsterdam in 1701 by Juriaen Pool II – Restituted October 2011
- Allegory of Earth and Water by Jan Brueghel the Younger – Restituted November 2010
- St. Jerome by Lodovico Carracci – Restituted May 2009
- Portrait of a Musician Playing a Bagpipe, 1632 by Northern Netherlandish School – Restituted April 2009
- Flight into Egypt by Circle of Jan Wellens de Cock – Restituted December 2008
- Girl from the Sabine Mountains by Franz Xaver Winterhalter – Restituted January 2008
- Extensive Landscape with Travelers on a Track Near a Walled Town with a Castle and a Church, a Village Beyond by Jan de Vos I – Restituted December 2007
- Portrait of Jan van Eversdyck by Nicolas Neufchatel – Restituted February 2007
- Aimée, A Young Egyptian by Emile C.H. Vernet-Lecomte – Restituted October 2006
- self-portrait, Wilhelm von Schadow, restituted 2014
- The Artist’s Children from the City of Düsseldorf, Wilhelm von Schadow, restituted 2023
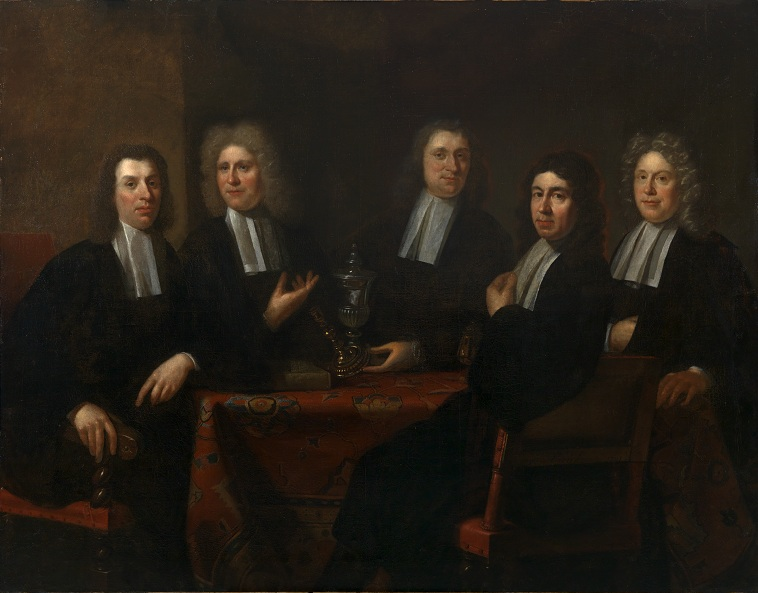
The Masters of the Goldsmith Guild in Amsterdam in 1701

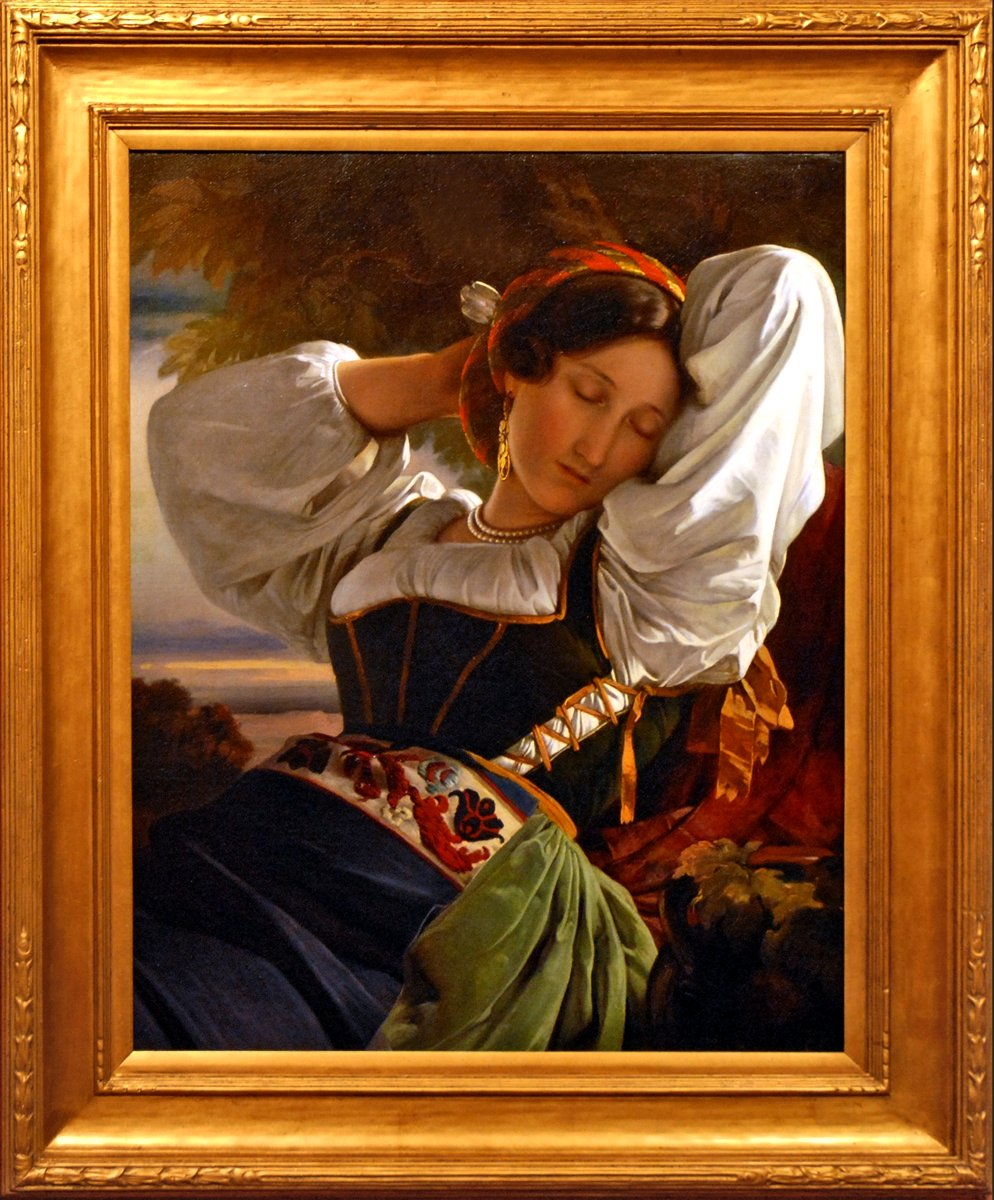
Girl from the Sabine Mountains
