= Walter Westfeld =

German Jewish art collector murdered at Auschwitz

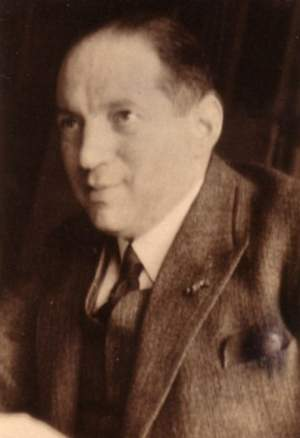
Walter Westfeld

Walter Westfeld or Westfield (4 March 1889 – c. May 1945) was a German Jewish art collector and art dealer whose collection was plundered by Nazis. Westfield was murdered in the Holocaust.

== Early life ==
Walter Westfeld, brother of the painter Max Westfeld, ran a gallery in Wuppertal-Elberfeld at Herzogstrasse 2 from 1920 to May 1936.

== Nazi persecution ==
When the Nazis came to power in 1933, Walter Westfeld was persecuted and plundered because of his Jewish origins.

After the Reich Chamber of Culture banned outlawed Jewish art dealers, Westfeld was forced to liquidate his gallery. He moved to Düsseldorf at Humboldtstrasse 24.

=== Attempt to flee ===
In August 1937 he was denounced to the Düsseldorf police for violating Nazi anti-semitic race laws by living with a non-Jew Emelie Scheulen (born 6 June 1896 in Düsseldorf). After Kristallnacht in 1938, he and Scheulen and Westfeld prepared to flee to the USA. According to the book Lost Lives, Lost Art: Jewish Collectors, Nazi Art Theft and the Quest for Justice, he "sold a few artworks, smuggled cash to his brother Robert via Amsterdam, and had about 250 of his most precious paintings and sculptures as well as numerous picture frames taken over the border to France with false papers. Assisting him were his servant Werner Abel, Düsseldorf art dealer and freight forwarder Fritz Beyer and August Kleucker." The Nazis, however, had enacted confiscatory taxes, fees and rules to rob fleeing Jews of all their assets, and on 15 November 1938 Westfeld was arrested for violating the Third Reich's foreign exchange regulations.

=== Forced auction at Lempertz ===
The artworks still remaining in his collection were confiscated and on 12 and 13 December 1939, auctioned by Lempertz auction house in Cologne under Joseph Hanstein. Westfeld was taken out of detention and forced to work on the catalog of the forced sale. The title of the auction was "Foreclosure ... from non-Aryan property ... on behalf of the Public Prosecutor General Düsseldorf." The forced auction of Westfeld's collection included artworks by Peter Paul Rubens, Egbert van der Poel, Antonio Molinari, Arnold Böcklin, Alselm Feuerbach, Camille Pissarro, Jean-François Millet, Carl Spitzweg, Andreas Achenbach, Franz von Defregger, Franz von Lenbach, Adolf Scheyer and Rombout van Troyen.

The Düsseldorf Regional Court sentenced Westfeld on 2 July 1940, under Director Hans Opderbecke and his assessors, Theodor Hoberg and Theo Groove, to three years and six months in prison and a fine of 300,000 Reichsmarks. Emilie Scheulen was sentenced to six months in prison and a fine of 1,000 Reichsmarks. After serving his sentence, Westfeld was immediately rearrested in 1942 because, as a Jew, he was considered an enemy of the Nazi state.

Westfeld wrote a letter to Scheulen in which he expressed his fear of being deported and concluded with the sentence, "There is not much fiddling about with a Jew." On 15 June 1942, Westfeld was questioned again by the Gestapo in the Düsseldorf police prison which wanted to locate an El Greco in his collection which Hitler wanted to confiscate the picture for his Führermuseum in Linz. On 23 September 1942, Walter Westfeld wrote his will on a small piece of cloth in his cell and appointed Emilie Scheulen as sole heir. He wrote his last words to his partner, whom he called Ihmer: "I know everything will be different after the war. So you, head up! Yet. Yet! I wait for you all over the world. 1000 grape greetings from the paradise of memory."

=== Deportation and murder by Nazis ===
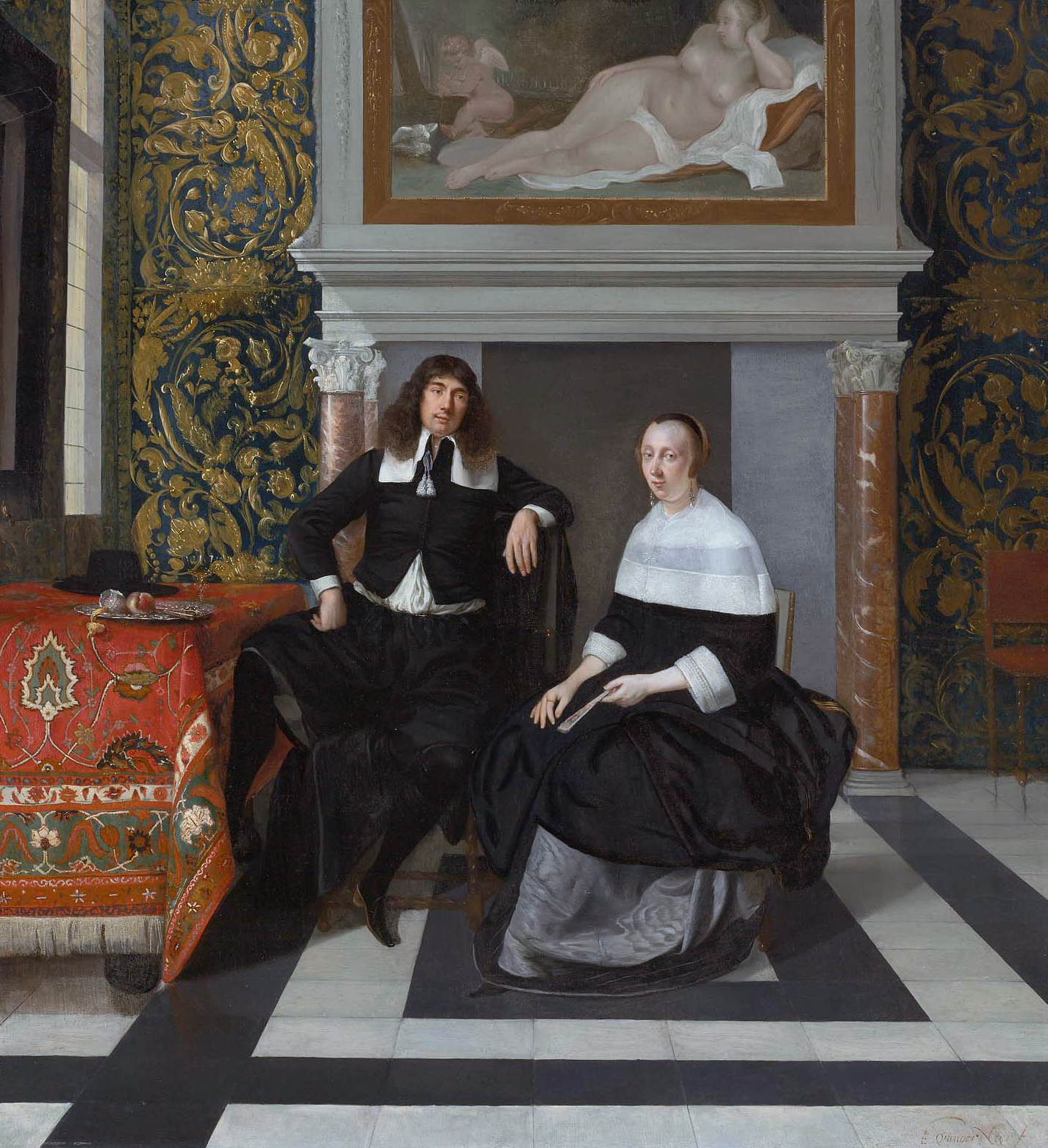
Painting by Eglon van der Neer from the Westfeld collection, now in the Museum of Fine Arts (Boston)

On 1 October 1942 Walter Westfeld was deported to Theresienstadt concentration camp on the orders of Police Officer Wilhelm Kurt Friedrich. Shortly thereafter, the Düsseldorf Regional Council, which did not recognize Westfeld's legacy to Scheulen, ordered the collection of Westfeld's remaining assets. Walter Westfeld was deported from Theresienstadt to Auschwitz on 23 January 1943, where he was subsequently murdered. The exact date of his death is unknown. In May 1945 he was pronounced dead.

== Attempts to recover the looted art collection ==
In September 1947, Emilie Scheulen asked Galerie Lempertz for information about Walter Westfeld's assets. The gallery announced that all related documents had been destroyed.

At the request of the Düsseldorf public prosecutor's office, the foreign currency ruling against Walter Westfeld of 2 July 1940 was overturned on 13 May 1952.

On 19 April 1956, the Ministry of Justice of North Rhine-Westphalia issued a certificate confirming that Westfeld was married to Emilie Scheulen (marriage certificate No. 362/1956 of the registry office Düsseldorf-Mitte dated 30 May 1956) and the marriage was retroactively registered for the date of 1 October 1935.

The Westfeld family has located a few of the artworks, including an Adolf Menzel and a Franz von Lenbach (in Burladingen), however while Menzel's Upturned Teapot was restituted, the mayor of Burladingen rejected any attempt to make amends stating, "We are not bound by the Washington Declaration... If we had a duty to return the painting, there would be laws forcing us to do so. But there are no such laws".

Other works, such as the watercolor Das Burggespenst by Leo Putz, seized in 1939 and auctioned off through Lempertz, are considered lost and listed on the German Lost Art Foundation website (Lost Art-ID 461012)

The Westfeld heirs, represented by Fred Westfeld, have initiated several restitution claims for the looted artworks.

In 2011, a settlement was reached between the Westfeld heir and the Boston Museum of Fine Arts for the painting, Portrait of a Man and Woman in an Interior (1665–67) by Dutch artist Eglon van der Neer (1634–1703) It had been sold to the museum by E. & A. Silberman Galleries.

A lawsuit Westfield v. Federal Republic of Germany was also filed against Germany. Germany refused to restitute the looted artworks arguing that they were barred by the Foreign Sovereign Immunities Act, an argument which was accepted by the judge.

== Literature ==
- Herbert Schmidt: Der Elendsweg der Düsseldorfer Juden – Chronologie des Schreckens 1933–1945. Droste, Düsseldorf 2005, ISBN 3-7700-1204-6.
- Schweiger, Werner J. "Graphisches Kabinett J. Amendt". kunsthandel-der-moderne.eu. Archived from the original on 12 September 2007.

== See also ==
The Holocaust

List of claims for restitution for Nazi-looted art

Nazi plunder
