= Cucuel =

Cucuel is a surname. Notable people with the surname include:

- Edward Cucuel (1875–1954), American-born, German-based painter
- Léo Cucuel (born 1987), Tahitian coach and badminton player
