= Truth, Time and History =

1812–1814 painting by Francisco de Goya

- La Verdad, el Tiempo y la Historia (Spanish)
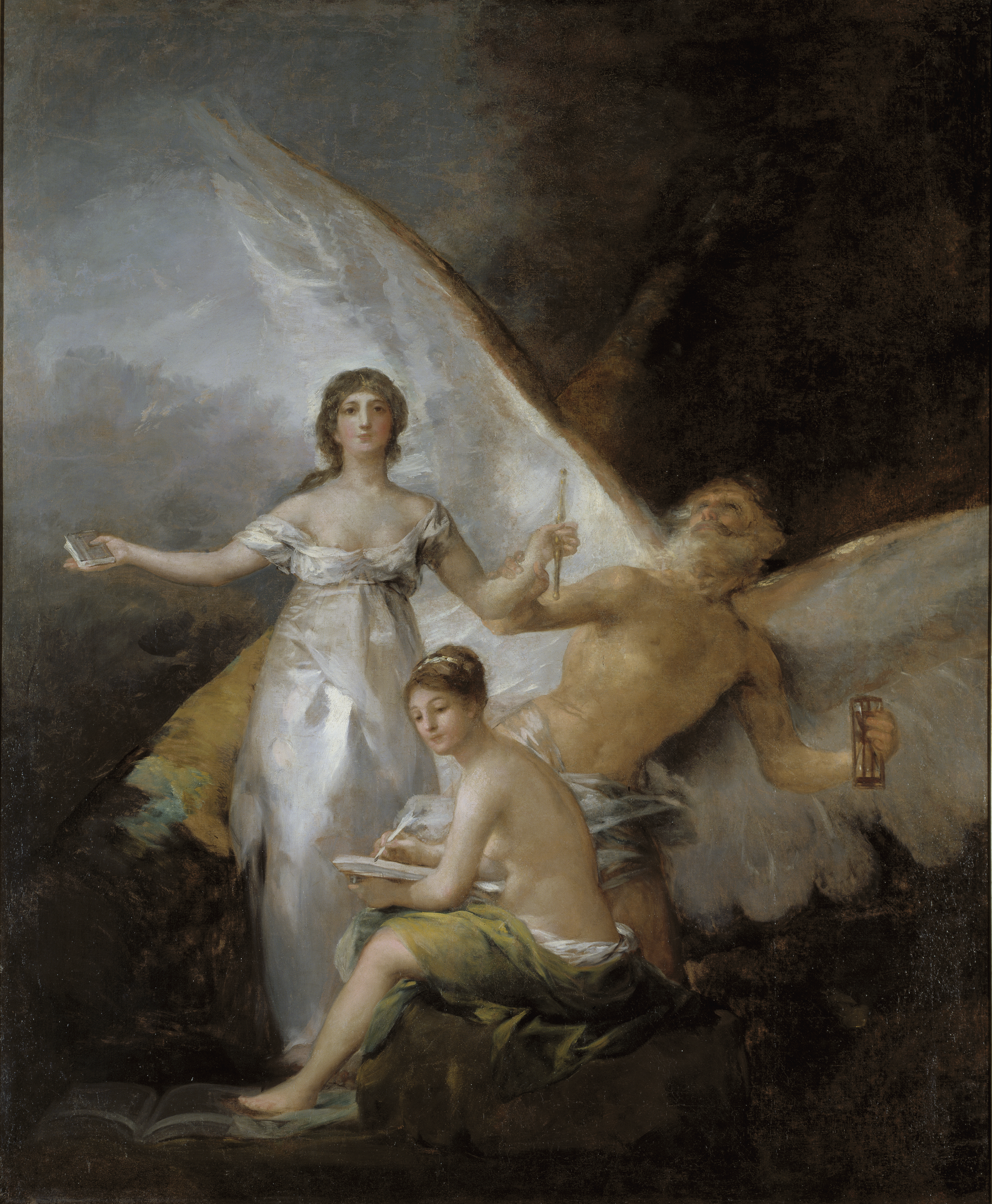
- Artist: Francisco Goya
- Year: c. 1804–1808
- Medium: Oil on canvas
- Dimensions: 294 cm × 244 cm (116 in × 96 in)
- Location: Nationalmuseum, Stockholm

Truth, Time and History (Spanish: La Verdad, el Tiempo y la Historia) is an oil-on-canvas painting by the Spanish artist Francisco Goya. The painting is also known by the titles Spain, Time, and History and Allegory of the Constitution of 1812. It has been assigned dates ranging from 1797 to 1812, though it is most commonly dated between 1804 and 1808. It is currently in the collection of the Nationalmuseum in Stockholm.

The painting is often thought to have been commissioned in conjunction with a second piece titled Poetry (Spanish: la Poesia) for Manuel Godoy. Godoy was the First Secretary of State of Spain at the time, and the paintings may have decorated his palace in Madrid.

== Description ==
History sits nude on a rock in the front center of the painting, holding a white quill with an open book in her lap. Wrapped around her waist is a green cloth, and another book lies open at her feet.

Time appears behind History, to the right. He is an elderly, bearded man holding an hourglass. His face looks upward so that most of the details of his features are obscured from view. Time bears large, white wings that extend outward, off the canvas on the right and on the left, behind the body of the third figure, who he grips by the arm.

There are conflicting interpretations of the identity of the woman dressed in white on the left of the painting. Most often labeled Truth, she faces the viewer with her breasts partially exposed, holding a scepter in her left hand and a gray book in her right.

The background of the painting is light on the left behind Truth and dark on the right side surrounding Time.

== Interpretations ==
Art historian Martin S. Soria titles the painting Spain, Time, and History and claims that the painting was likely created around 1797. He asserts the strong influence of Cesare Ripa's Iconologia (first published in 1596) on Goya's depiction of Time and History as classic allegorical figures. In Soria's interpretation, History fulfills a traditional role, "making men immortal" by recording the actions of humanity, and she looks over her shoulder as a way of symbolizing remembrance of the past she records. Goya departs from Ripa's representation of Time (called Saturn by Ripa) because traditionally, History uses Time's back as a desk while recording events. Soria determines that the third figure in the painting represents Spain, who is pulled by Time "into a brighter future" as Time looks upward "imploring assistance from Heaven." Time's hourglass may be a political commentary on the urgency of Spain's need to move forward, a foreshadowing of Napoleon's impending occupation of Spain beginning in 1807. Soria considers Poetry a companion painting to this piece, and he interprets the two in light of each other.

Some are unconvinced by Soria's interpretation of Spain as the third figure because, at the time of the painting's creation, Spain was traditionally represented in a crown with various symbols that would make her easily identifiable. The art historian Folke Nordström points to congruences between the third figure and the allegorical representation of Philosophy, as both carry books and a scepter.

Eleanor Sayre, an art historian and Goya scholar, dates the painting much later, arguing that it was created in 1812. This interpretation stems from Sayre's belief that the painting refers to the Spanish Constitution of 1812. Sayre's argument leads to her to title the work Allegory of the Constitution of 1812. Those who follow this interpretation state that the third figure in the painting is representative of the law. Time's hourglass has just been turned over, "indicating that a new era begins."

Juan Luna, in his description written for the Stockholm National Museum catalog, posits that the standing woman holding a book represents Spain as well as Truth. It could be an allegory of the Spanish Constitution, adopted in 1812 during Spain's liberation from Napoleonic rule, and the twofold symbolism may be designed to underscore the legitimacy of the new constitution.

== Preliminary work ==
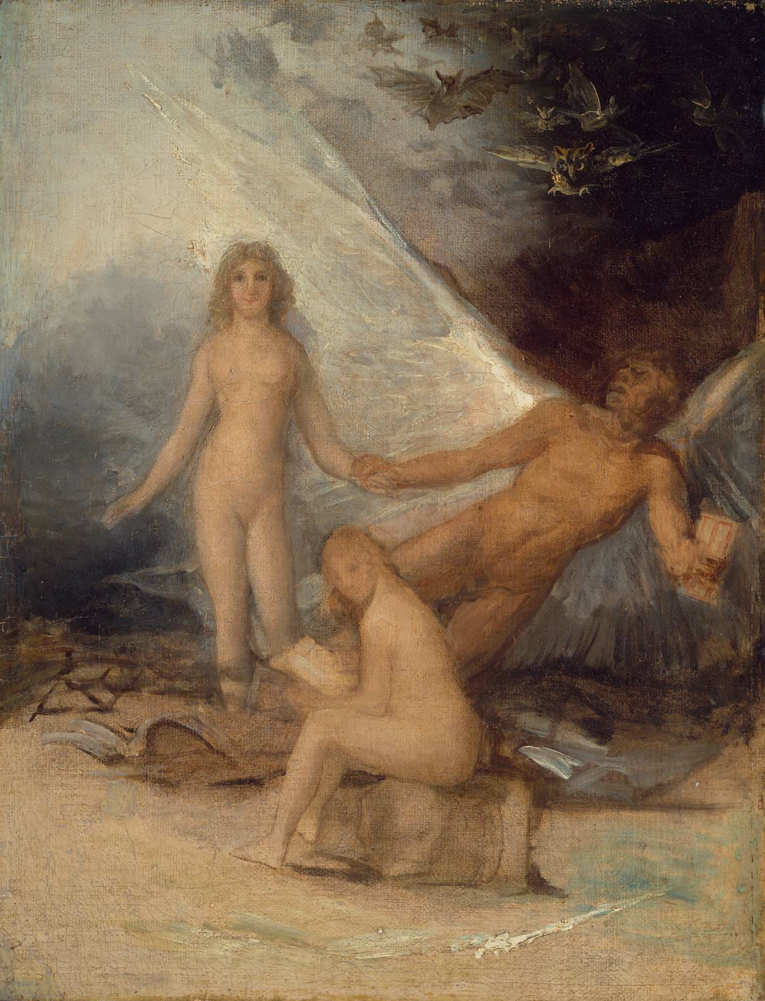
Sketch about 1797–1799 or 1804, Museum of Fine Arts, Boston

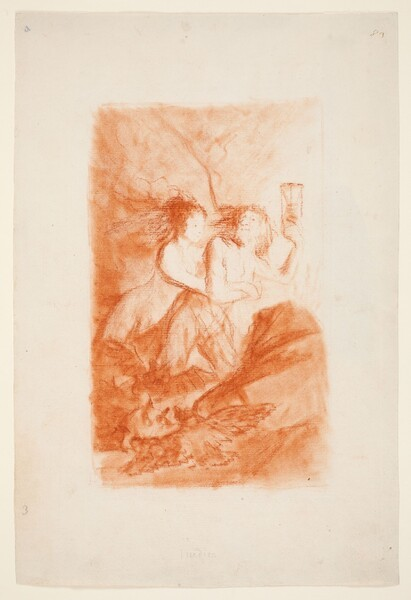
Sketch from 1797; red chalk and sanguine wash on laid paper, Prado Museum, Madrid.

Goya made a related, rough oil sketch between 1797 and 1799 (or, by some accounts, in 1804). In this version, the winged Time holds a nude Truth by the hand, while threatening bats and owls lurk above them. The sketch is in the collection of Museum of Fine Arts in Boston. No owls or bats appear in the final version of the painting, nor were they painted over.

Another red chalk and wash sketch of the same allegorical figures of Time and Truth in slightly different positions, escaping from dark owls at the lower left hand corner of the sketch, is in the Prado Museum in Madrid, Spain. It has been confirmed that Goya created this sketch to prepare for Los Caprichos. However, it may also be associated with Truth, Time, and History. Martin S. Soria references this sketch as evidence that Goya did not initially include History in his plans for the painting.

The drawing appears in a small sketchbook that Goya owned and began working on while in Italy; the sketchbook is now located in the Prado, Madrid.

== Provenance ==
The first reliable record of provenance for this painting is from 1867. Charles Yriarte recorded this painting (and Poetry) as both in the collection of Juan Duncan Shaw, the Austrian consul in Cádiz. Because this is the first notable record of either piece, the two are sometimes considered a pair. Janis A. Tomlinson, a Goya art historian, writes that "in the absence of other documents, it is not possible to trace their provenance to Godoy’s collection."

After Mr. Shaw's death in 1878, the paintings were passed to his decedents and their provenance until present is as follows:

- 1900: Mr Luis de Navas in Madrid.
- The collection of Charles Deering of Chicago, on display in his residence in Sitges, Barcelona for a time before being moved to Chicago.
- 1927 (Mr. Deering's death): Acquired by the New York company E. & A. Silberman Galleries
- 1961: Acquired by the National Museum of Fine Arts in Stockholm.
