= Leo Putz =

Tyrolean painter

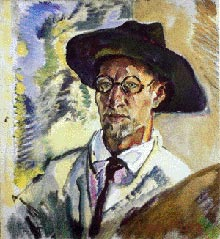
- Self-portrait (1914)
- Born: 18 June 1869; Meran, South Tyrol, Austria-Hungary
- Died: 21 July 1940 (aged 71); Merano, Kingdom of Italy
- Education: Academy of Fine Arts Munich
- Occupations: Artist, educator
- Known for: Painting
- Style: Art Nouveau; Impressionism; Expressionism
- Spouse: Frieda Blell (m. 1913)

Leo Putz (18 June 1869, Meran, South Tyrol, Austria-Hungary – 21 July 1940, Merano, Kingdom of Italy) was a Tyrolean painter. His work encompasses Art Nouveau, Impressionism and the beginnings of Expressionism. Figures, nudes and landscapes were his predominant subjects.

== Life ==
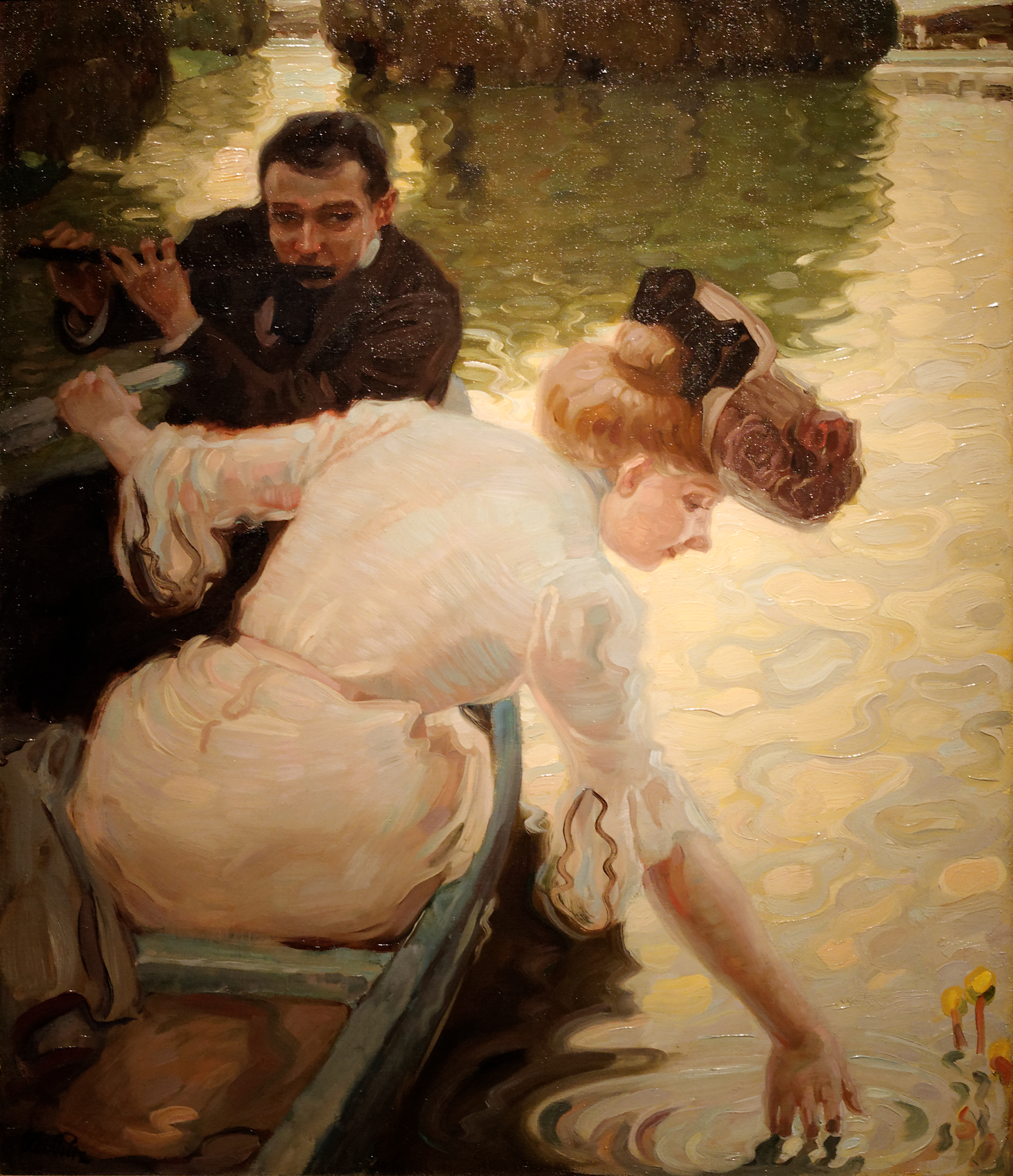
Calm Day (1901)

His father, Karl Putz, was the Mayor of Meran. He began his studies at the age of sixteen at the Academy of Fine Arts Munich, where he studied with the history painter Gabriel von Hackl. Convinced that he had great talent, his father sent him to the Académie Julian in Paris. After military service, he returned to Munich and studied with Paul Hoecker. He opened his first studio in 1897. That same year, he became a member of the Munich Secession. He worked with the weekly magazine Jugend and many of his paintings were reproduced on the magazine's title page. During this time, he also worked as a commercial artist, creating many posters in Art Nouveau style and billboards for the Moderne Galerie München.

The Staatsgalerie Dresden and the Neue Königliche Pinakothek acquired many of his works in 1903. He became an honorary citizen of Bavaria in 1909; a prerequisite for becoming a Professor, for which he received appointment that same year.

Between 1909 and 1914, he spent his summers at Schloss Hartmannsberg near Chiemgau to practice plein-air painting. While there, he took on several students, among them the American artist Edward Cucuel. It was also there that he created his best-known works; the two series known as the "Boat Pictures" and the "Bathers". In both, he focused on portraying beautiful young women, a prominent feature of his early work. In 1913, he married the landscape painter Frieda Blell. He relocated to Gauting in 1922, where he built a house, trading his paintings for building materials.

=== To Brazil and back ===
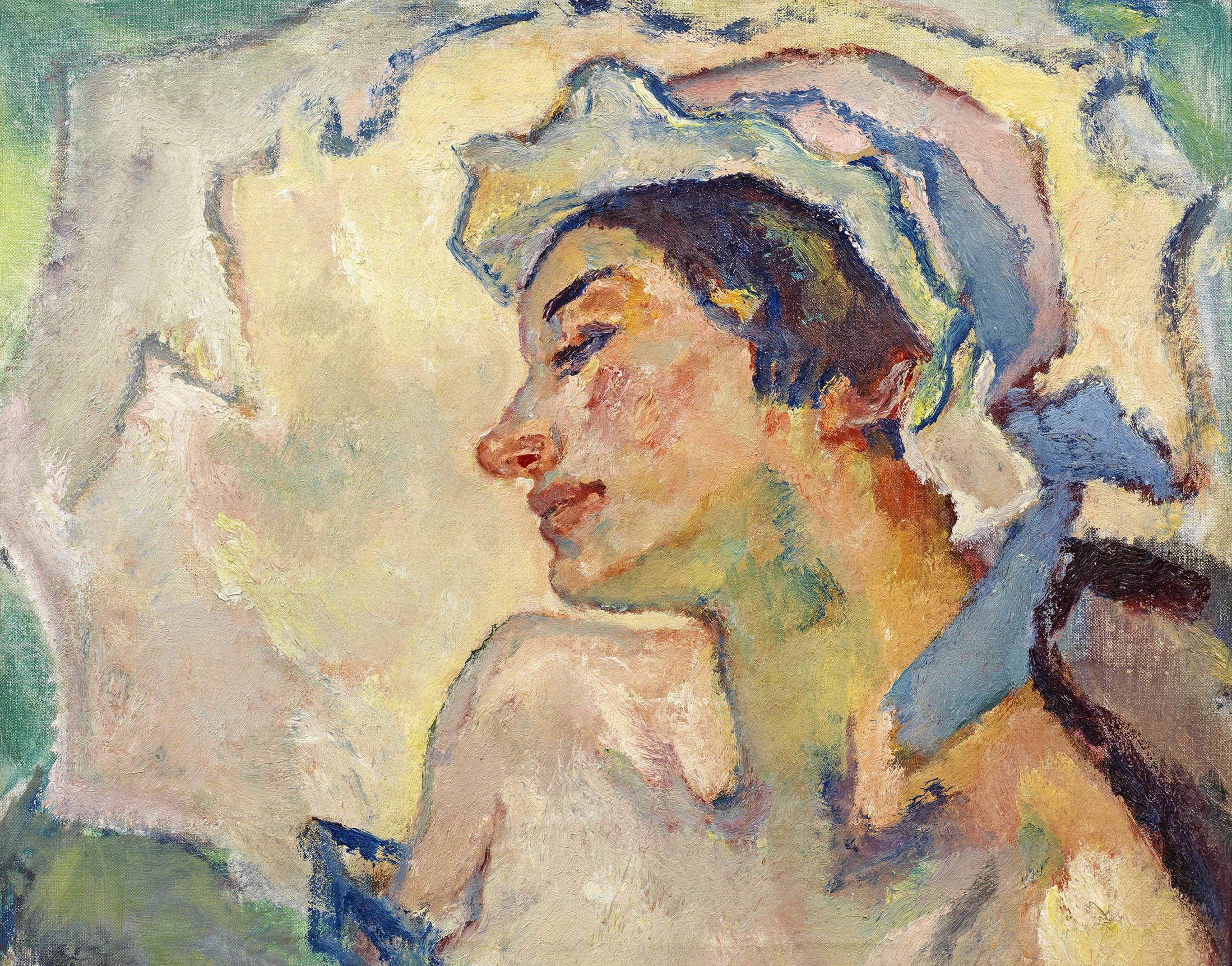
Adelheid (1927)

He and his family accepted an invitation to move to Brazil in 1929. At the request of Lúcio Costa, he took a professorship at the Escola Nacional de Belas Artes in 1931.

There, he gave lectures on composition and took on several students, including the landscape architect Roberto Burle Marx. During his stay, his colors took on a more tropical flavor and the (for him) exotic plant life became a favorite subject. He would often travel to remote areas on muleback in search of inspiration. He returned to Germany in 1933. A selection of his South American works was the focus of an exhibition in Munich in 1935, which has been fiercely attacked by the Nazi propagandist newspaper Der Stürmer due to the exotic nature of the depicted issues.

Leo Putz is represented with two drawings of scenes do Rio de Janeiro in the collection of the Museu de Arte do Rio (MAR), a gift of Fundo Z.

== Nazi era seizures and destruction of artworks ==
An opponent of National Socialism, Putz' art was labelled "degenerate". Beginning in 1936, he was repeatedly interrogated by the Gestapo and was forced to flee back to his native region, the South Tyrol. In 1937, he was officially banned from working in Germany. His watercolor Zwei Akte and the prints Liegender Frauenakt and Zwei Akte were confiscated from the Staatliche Kunstsammlungen Kassel in the Nazi "Degenerate Art" campaign and destroyed. He was banned from working in Germany. His watercolor Das Burggespenst (60 × 46 cm) was seized with the collection of the Jewish art dealer Walter Westfeld and sold at auction by Kunsthaus Lempertz in 1939, after which its fate is unknown. It is listed on the German Lost Art Foundation (Lost Art-ID461012).

For the remainder of his life, he concentrated on painting castles, villages and benign landscapes.

He died in 1940, following an operation. News of his death was suppressed in Italy and Germany and he was quietly interred in Gauting.
