= Lempertz =

German auction house

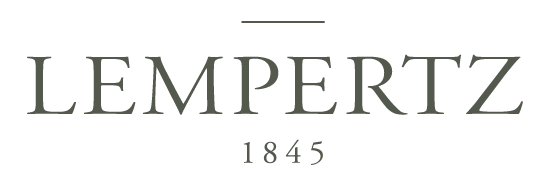

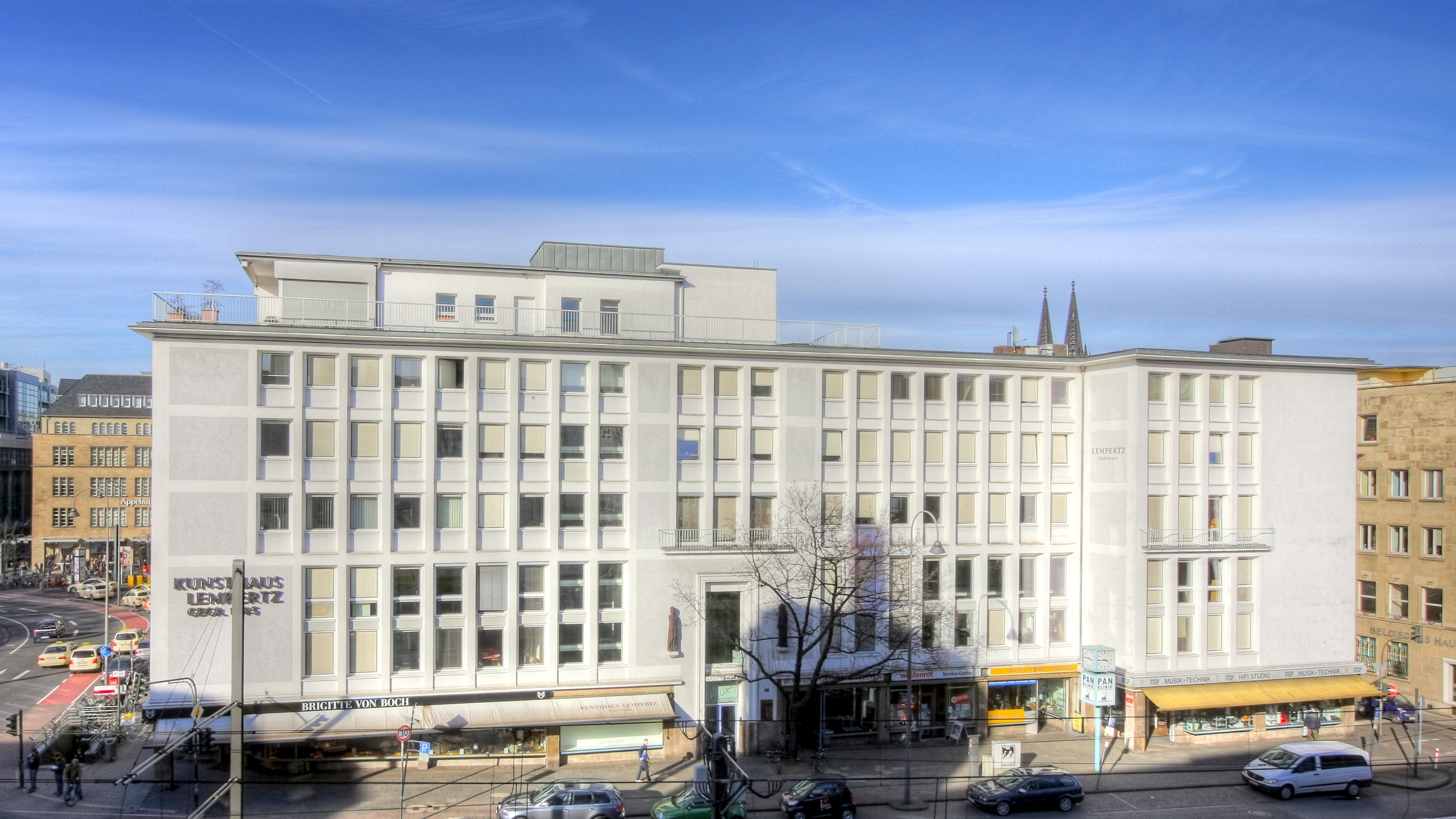
- Lempertz in Neumarkt, Cologne, Germany
- Native name: Kunsthaus Lempertz KG
- Type: Private
- Industry: Art, auctions
- Founded: 1845; 181 years ago
- Headquarters: Cologne, Germany
- Area served: Worldwide
- Number of employees: 21-50 (seasonal)
- Website: www.lempertz.com

Lempertz (officially Kunsthaus Lempertz KG) is a German auction house which emerged from a bookstore and art gallery founded 1845 in Bonn, Germany. It is entirely owned and controlled by the Lempertz family and headquartered in Cologne, Germany.

== Early years ==
Lempertz's roots go back to 1802 when Johann Matthias Heberle (1775–1840) opened a printing company in Cologne in 1802, which was later expanded to include an “antiquarian and auction house”. The first auction of the J. M. Heberle company took place in 1811. After the company's founder died in 1840, his 24-year-old employee Heinrich Lempertz (1816–1898) took over the company, which from then on became “J. M. Heberle (H. Lempertz).

Mathias Lempertz (1821–1886), the brother of Heinrich Lempertz, opened the “Buch- und Kunsthandlung Heberle-Lempertz” in 1845 as a branch of the Cologne company at Fürstenstrasse 2 in Bonn. In the same year, the first public auction of August Wilhelm Schlegel's posthumous library took place on December 1. In 1854 the Bonn branch became an independent company owned by Mathias Lempertz.

In 1875 Peter Hanstein (1853–1925) bought the company, paying 20,000 gold marks for the name Math. Lempertz, bookstore and antiquarian bookshop. Three years later he founded the Peter Hanstein Verlag, which focused on history, philosophy and theology. In 1888 the bookstore moved to new premises in Hof 40, later in Franziskanerstraße 6 in Bonn. As more paintings by old masters and applied arts were auctioned, a branch was opened in Cologne in 1902, which was initially located at Domhof 6 in the house of the Archbishop's Diocesan Museum. In 1908 Lempertz was the first European auction house to start auctioning East Asian art.

In 1918 the Math. Lempertz company acquired the classicist house Fastenrat at Neumarkt 3, corner of Cäcilienstraße 48, from the estate of Johannes Fastenrath.

After Peter Hanstein's death in 1925, his two sons Hans Hanstein (1879–1940) and Josef Hanstein (1885–1968), who had been partners since 1912, inherited the company. Manfred Faber converted and expanded the office building on Neumarkt in 1933/34 before being murdered in the Holocaust. From 1937 to spring 1938 Heinrich Böll apprenticed as a bookseller in the Lempertz bookstore in Bonn.

== Nazi Germany 1933-1945 ==
Lempertz was involved in auctioning off Jewish property seized by the Nazis or sold due to Nazi persecution.

228 artworks from Jewish art dealer Max Stern (1904–1987) whose gallery was closed by the Nazi Reich Chamber of Fine Arts was sold off at Lempertz. On 12./13. December 1939, the collection of the Jewish art dealer Walter Westfeld (1889–1943) arrested by Nazis and plundered, was sold off at Lempertz.

== Lempertz after 1945 ==
=== Bookstore ===
In 1947 the bookstore was re-established as Mathias Lempertz Buchhandlung und Antiquariat GmbH in Bonn at Fürstenstrasse 1. It gradually developed into a university bookstore and in 1983 also became the official depository bookstore of the Bibliotheca Vaticana publishing house. In 1996 the publisher Franz-Christoph Heel bought the bookstore and in the following year founded the book publisher "Edition Lempertz" in Bonn, whose book program deals particularly with topics of Catholic theology and regional publications. The manager of Edition Lempertz was Antje-Friederike Heel, who in 1999 also took over the management of Matthias Lempertz Buchhandlung und Antiquariat GmbH. In 2003 Edition Lempertz and Siegler Verlag were merged. The Siegler Verlag program mostly includes military history publications, published under the imprint of the Brandenburg publishing house. Its naming rights come from the former military publisher of the German Democratic Republic. On December 31, 2005, the Lempertz bookstore in Bonn was closed after more than 150 years.

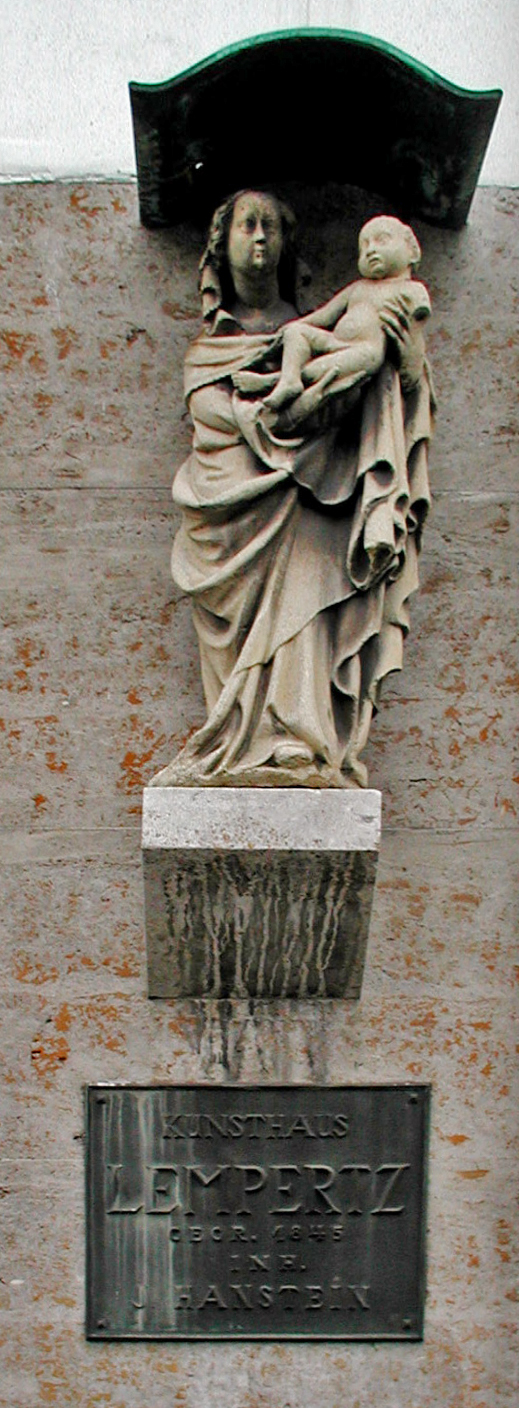
Madonna mit Kind an der Fassade der Galerie (2007)

=== Auction house ===
After the war, Josef Hanstein (1885–1968) and his son Rolf Hanstein (1919–1970) continued to run the “Kunsthaus Lempertz”. The building has been a listed building since September 3, 1993. From 1953 to 1957 the first exhibitions of the Roman-Germanic Museum and the Wallraf-Richartz Museum took place there. Since 1958 the house has held separate auctions of modern art. In 1965 the first foreign office was opened in New York, further representative offices followed. The Lempertz Contempora gallery for contemporary art was also opened in 1965. After Rolf Hanstein's premature death in a car accident in 1970, his son Henrik Hanstein (* 1950) took over the business. As the leading German auction house, Lempertz has been auctioning contemporary art as well as photography and photographic works in its own auctions since 1989.

With its representative offices in Berlin, Frankfurt, Munich, Zurich, Brussels, Paris, Tokyo and Shanghai, the Kunsthaus Lempertz is one of the most important art auction houses in Europe today. Around 14 auctions are held each year, accompanied by illustrated catalogs and one-week preview. In addition to the spring and autumn auctions, at which ancient art, applied arts, modern and contemporary art, photography and photo works as well as East Asian art are auctioned, there are the two auctions for books and graphics, as well as the tribal art auction in spring. The auctions take place in Cologne as well as in the branches in Brussels and Berlin. In addition, Lempertz has long acted as an intermediary between private collectors and museums and has been able to convey important cultural assets to public institutions. Lempertz is a member of the "International Auctioneer" (IA AG) group, which was founded in 1993 and brings together eight leading independent auction houses from eight countries around the world. The turnover in 2012 was 51 million euros.

== Criticism ==
=== Nazi-looted art ===
Lempertz was listed in the 1946 OSS Art Looting Investigation Unit's Red Flag List of Names for involvement in the Nazi-looted art trade. At present, the German Lost Art Foundation registers more than 680 artworks that mention Lempertz.

In 1977, and again in 1996, Lempertz sold art that it had previously sold in 1937, without mentioning that, under the Nazis, it had been subject to a forced sale from the collection of Max Stern.

In May 1981 Lempertz auctioned between 20 and 30 artworks, for one million DM, from Albert Speer's possession, using the anonymous provenance indication “From private property”.

In 2008, the heirs of Walter Westfeld, who was murdered in Auschwitz, sued Germany for the restitution of an art collection that including paintings by El Greco and Peter Paul Rubens, which had been seized by the Nazis and auctioned at Lempertz in 1939. According to NBC News the "Lempertz auction house in Cologne, Germany, claimed the property was destroyed during bombing in WWII, but the lawsuit includes a copy of the December 1939 sale catalog and price list."

In 2007, "Portrait of a Musician Playing a Bagpipe" by an unknown Dutch artist, originally from the Max Stern collection, was sold at Lempertz, which had conducted the forced sale in 1937 to a London dealer, Philip Mould Ltd., who then sold it to Lawrence Steigrad in NY where it was spotted by the Holocaust Claims Processing Office. It was restituted to the heirs of Max Stern in 2009.

In 2009 New York art dealer Richard Feigen restituted, to the heirs of Max Stern, an Italian baroque painting of St. Jerome in the Wilderness, attributed to Ludovico Carracci (1555-1619), that he had acquired at Lempertz. “I was surprised that Lempertz had been the auctioneer in the forced sale in 1937 and then resold it to me in 2000,” he said.

In 2011, Lempertz dismissed a claim from heirs of Sophie Lissitzky-Kueppers, a Jewish art collector plundered by the Nazis, and decided to continue an auction of 1923 a Kandinsky painting “Zwei Schwarze Flecken” (“Two Black Marks”) despite the family's assertion that it had been stolen by the Nazis.

=== Forgeries ===
In October 2010 Lempertz auctioned forged paintings by Wolfgang Beltracchi, including forgeries attributed to Heinrich Campendonk and Max Pechstein from a nonexistent "Jäger" collection, including the forgery of Campendonk's “Rotes Picture with horses ”at a record price of 2.4 million euros. On September 1, 2012, the Cologne Regional Court sentenced the Lempertz Kunsthaus to pay more than two million euros in damages (after Lempertz had previously repaid the plaintiff €800,000).

== Important auctions and brokerage ==
- 1837 Gemäldesammlung von Jacob Lyversberg
- 1845 Bibliothek von August Wilhelm Schlegel
- 1860 Bibliothek von Ernst Moritz Arndt
- 1877 Bibliothek von Karl Simrock
- 1893 Fränkische und römische Antiquitäten aus den Ausgrabungen des Nieder-Breisiger Totenfeldes
- 1898 Nachlass von Wilhelm von Woyna
- 1901 Sammlung von Bildern aus dem Hause Felix Mendelssohn Bartholdy
- 1903 Sammlung des ehem. Kölner Beigeordneten Karl Ferdinand Thewalt (1.150.000 Goldmark)
- 1908 Erste Auktion Ostasiatischer Kunst
- Auktion 124, 1911: Nachlass von Johannes Niessen
- 1920 Gemälde älterer Meister aus den Beständen des Landesmuseums Darmstadt
- 1923 Bibliothek Drachenburg bei Königswinter
- 1929 Bibliothek von Viktoria zu Schaumburg-Lippe aus dem Palais Schaumburg
- 1937 (Auktion 392) Bestände der Galerie Stern, Düsseldorf, mit Werken von Lodovico Carracci, Friedrich August von Kaulbach, Wilhelm von Schadow, Franz Xaver Winterhalter u. a.
- 1939 (Auktion 404) Sammlung Walter Westfeld (Zwangsversteigerung), mit Werken von Peter Paul Rubens, Antonio Molinari, Egbert van der Poel, Anselm Feuerbach, Arnold Böcklin, Franz von Lenbach, Charles Hoguet, Carl Spitzweg, Hans von Marées, Hans Thoma, Camille Pissarro u. a.
- 1969 Nachlass von Marga Böhmer, Lebensgefährtin von Ernst Barlach
- 1971 (Auktion 516) Sammlung Jacob Lyversberg
- 1979 ff Sammlung Albert Speer mit Werken von Jakob Philipp Hackert, Arnold Böcklin, Karl Friedrich Schinkel u. a. (ca. 1.000.000 DM)
- 1995 Aquarell August Macke Unter den Lauben in Thun (854.000 DM)
- 1997 Sammlung Otto Riese japanischer Holzschnitte
- 1999 Ölgemälde Pieter Brueghel der Jüngere: Tanz um den Maibaum. (2.745.000 DM)
- 2004 Relief Kurt Schwitters: Relief mit gelbem Viereck (€1.460.000 )
- 2005 Ölgemälde Lyonel Feininger: Gelmeroda XI (€1.700.000), Pablo Picasso: Carte a jouer et verre (€550.000 )
- 2006 Ölgemälde Emil Nolde: Marschhof 1947 (€1.400.000), Max Liebermann: Papageienmann (€903.000), Ernst Ludwig Kirchner: Stilleben mit 2 Holzfiguren und Blumen (€732.000), Salomon van Ruysdael: Flusslandschaft mit Fähre und einem mit Vieh beladenen Boot (€770.000 )
- 2007 Modelle Alberto Giacometti: 2 Original-Skulpturen (€1.590.000), Gouache und Aquarell Fernand Léger: Contraste de Formes (€1.280.000 )
- 2008 Gemälde Hans Hoffmann: Hase (€718.000 )
- 2011 Meißner Porzellanfigur Johann Gottlieb Kirchner: Sitzende Löwin (€1.100 000), Gouache Max Beckmann: Löwenbändiger (€864.000 )
- 2012 Gemälde Gerrit Dou: Alter Maler in seinem Atelier (€3.785.000), Gemälde Johann König: Auferstehung Christi (€878.000 )
- 2014 2 Heiligentafeln von Matteo Giovannetti von ca. 1345 aus dem Nachlass Franz von Lenbachs: (€2.656.000), Weltraumkapsel TKS-Raumschiff: (€1.000.000), Relief Trauergruppe aus einem Kalvarienberg, Sachsen 1500/1510, ehem. Sammlung Hermann Göring (€244.000 )
- 2015 Gemälde Alexej von Jawlensky: Garten am Bauernhaus (€544.000), Gemälde Andrea di Bonaiuto: Madonna mit Kind von Engeln und Heiligen umgeben, (€483.600), Gemälde Gerhard Richter: GRÜN-BLAU-ROT (€421.600 )
- 2016 Gemälde Ernst Ludwig Kirchner: Mädchen in Südwester (€1.576.000), Kreidezeichnung Vincent van Gogh, Femme semant (1.036.000), Gemälde Pieter Brueghel d. J., Das Hochzeitsmahl im Freien, (€1.096.000), Gemälde Josef Albers: Homage to the Square (€676.000), Gemälde Friedrich Nerly: Piazzetta di San Marco bei Mondschein (€496.000), Gemälde Ernst Wilhelm Nay: Vega (€372.000 )

== Literature ==
- Claudia Herstatt: Schädliche Herkunft, Der Streit um ein wertvolles Gemälde, das einmal Albert Speer gehört haben soll. In: Die Zeit, Nr. 19/2006
- Werner Höfer: Lempertz in New York, Brückenkopf des deutschen Kunsthandels. In Die Zeit, Nr. 46/1964
- Swantje Karich: Rote Pferde, gelbe Häuser und ein Schrank. In: FAZ, 31. Dezember 2006
- Stefan Koldehoff: Kein Bekenntnis zur Vergangenheit. Der deutsche Kunsthandel in der Nazizeit – eine Ausstellung. In: Süddeutsche Zeitung, 27. Februar 2007
- Catherine MacKenzie: Auktion 392, Reclaiming the Galerie Stern, Düsseldorf. FoFa Gallery, Concordia University, Montreal 2006, ISBN 0-9781694-0-9
- Josef Niesen: Bonner Personenlexikon. 2., verbesserte und erweiterte Auflage. Bouvier, Bonn 2008, ISBN 978-3-416-03180-6.
- Werner Schäfke: Kunsthaus Lempertz – Eine Kulturgeschichte, DuMont Buchverlag, Köln 2015, ISBN 978-3-8321-9487-1.
- Nina Senger; Katja Terlau: Methodik der Provenienzrecherche am Beispiel der Sammlung des Kunsthändlers Jacques Goudstikker, Amsterdam. In: AKMB-news 2/05, Jg. 11, Heidelberg 2005
- Steil nach oben. In: Der Spiegel. Nr. 50, 1968, S. 211 (online).

== See also ==
- List of oldest fine art auction houses
- List of claims for restitution for Nazi-looted art
- The Holocaust
- Walter Westfeld
- Max Stern
