= Saint Sebastian Thrown into the Cloaca Maxima =

Painting by Agostino Carracci

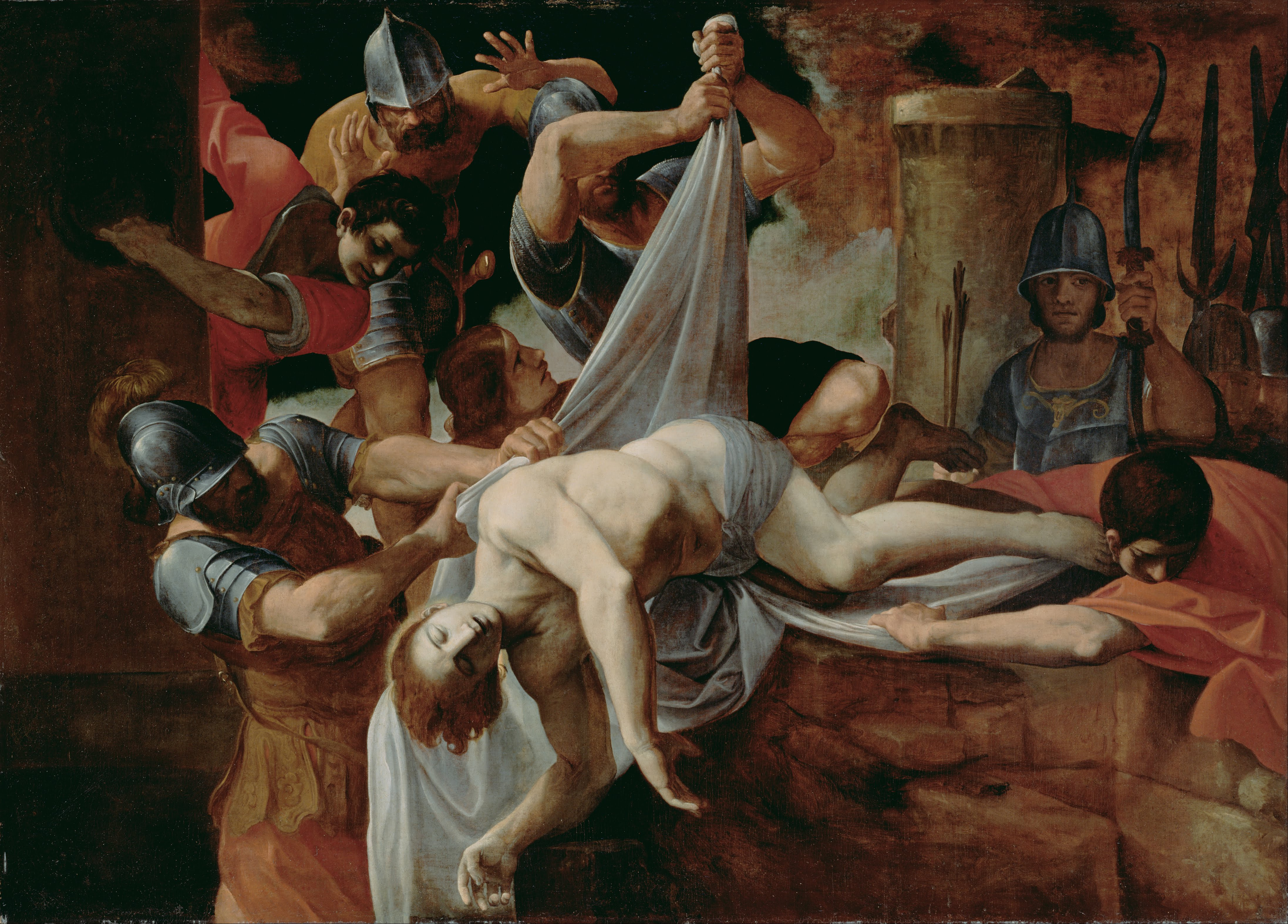
- Artist: Ludovico Carracci
- Year: 1612
- Medium: oil on canvas
- Dimensions: 167 cm × 233 cm (66 in × 92 in)
- Location: Getty Museum, Los Angeles

Saint Sebastian Thrown into the Cloaca Maxima is an oil painting on canvas executed by the Italian painter Ludovico Carracci in 1612. It is held in the Getty Museum, in Los Angeles, which acquired it in 1971. A preparatory drawing survives in the Louvre.

== History and description ==
It was commissioned by Maffeo Barberini, the future Pope Urban VIII, then papal legate in Bologna for a hypogeum under his chapel in the new church of Sant’Andrea della Valle, as evidenced in a contemporary letter. That chapel would be dedicated to Saint Sebastian and was built on the site of a small 12th century chapel, popularly known as San Bastianello and erected on the site where the martyr's body had been recovered from the Cloaca Maxima, Rome's main drain. However, the plan for an underground chapel did not come to fruition and the legate did not feel the work was suitable for public display in the main chapel, replacing it with the more edifying Saint Sebastian's Body Recovered from the Cloaca Maxima by Passignano.

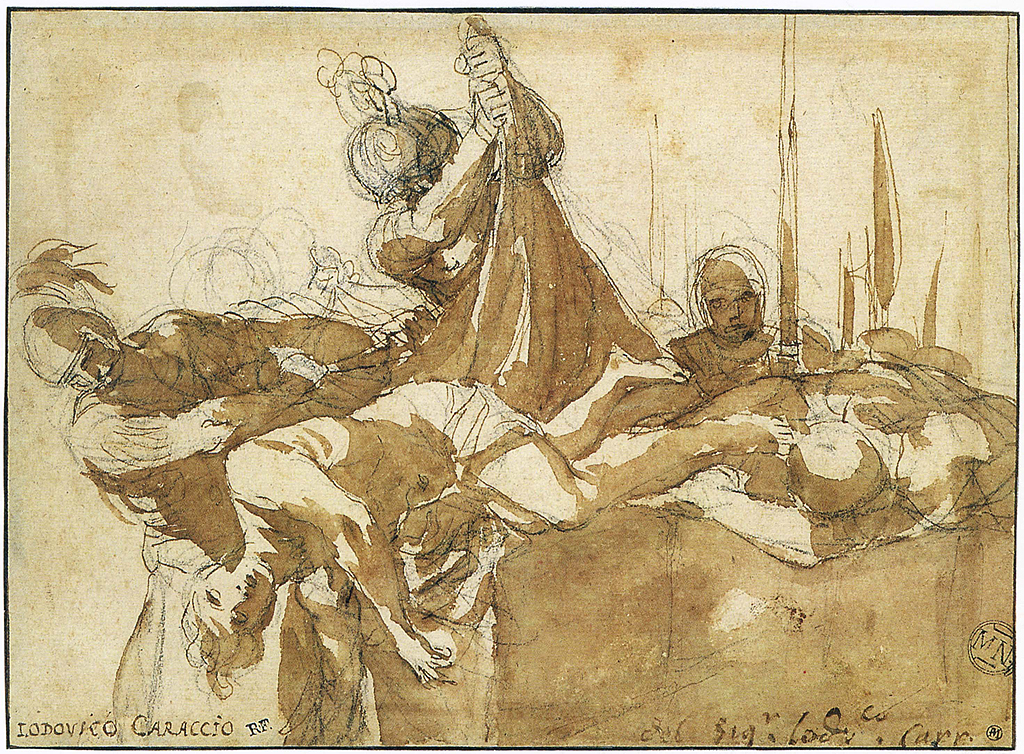
Preparatory drawing for the painting (Louvre)

Carracci's painting instead became part of the private Barberini family collection, appearing in several of its inventories. Carlo Cesare Malvasia, in Felsina Pittrice (1678), states the work as made "For the Lord Prince of Palestrina at Le Quattro Fontane", a title held by the Barberini family, with the Quattro Fontane being the site of their Palazzo Barberini, and as then being entitled Palinurus Buried by Soldiers, made as a Saint Sebastian.

== Description and style ==
The scene is set at night. A group of soldiers struggle to drag the martyr's body, which is now on the verge of falling into the sewer. To push it down, the torturers unroll the shroud in which Sebastian was wrapped.

The muscular tension of the soldiers, caused by the effort, is contrasted with the passive and inert pose of the saint's corpse. Only one of the soldiers is uninvolved in the turmoil of the event: the archer standing in the background on the right of the canvas, partially obscuring a column. This is an allusion to the first attempt to martyr Sebastian.

The entire group emerges from the darkness and the light focuses on the remains of Saint Sebastian, the fulcrum of the painting, captured in his cadaverous pallor. In the lighting effects and in the brutal activity of the muscular soldiers one can perhaps detect an influence of Caravaggio.
