= Transfiguration (Ludovico Carracci) =

Painting by Ludovico Carracci

The Transfiguration
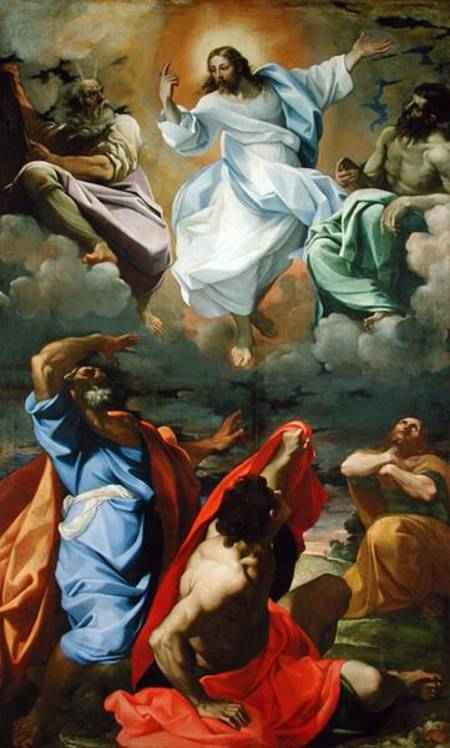
- Artist: Ludovico Carracci
- Year: 1595
- Medium: oil on canvas
- Dimensions: 437 cm × 267 cm (172 in × 105 in)
- Location: Pinacoteca Nazionale di Bologna, Bologna

The Transfiguration is an oil-on-canvas altarpiece created in 1595 by the Italian painter Ludovico Carracci. It is held in the Pinacoteca Nazionale di Bologna. An earlier version of the subject was painted between 1588 and 1590, and is housed in the Scottish National Gallery, in Edinburgh.

== History and description ==
This altarpiece was commissioned by Monsignor Dionisio Ratta for the church of San Pietro Martire in Bologna. The church, located on Via Orfeo #31, was affiliated with the adjacent Dominican convent. These buildings are presently deconsecrated and used by a private elementary school. The art critic Malvasia said of the painting that "from close up it terrified, exceeding by much what would be natural, but from a distance it is pleasing".

The painting depicts the event of the Transfiguration of Jesus, wherein Jesus after walking up to a mountaintop with the three apostles Peter, James, and John; gains a divine radiance and white robes; and begins conversing with Moses (with the horns of light) and Elijah. It is a moment when his divine nature is directly revealed to the apostles. Upon hearing the words of God informing them that this is the son of God, the apostles fall to the ground in fear.
