= E. & A. Silberman Galleries =

Commercial art gallery

- Company type: Art gallery
- Industry: Art dealing
- Founded: 1938 in New York City, United States
- Founders: Elkan Silberman, Abris Silberman
- Defunct: 1968
- Fate: Closed following founders’ deaths
- Headquarters: New York City, United States

E. & A. Silberman Galleries was a commercial art gallery in New York founded by Elkan and Abris Silberman.

== Early history ==
E. & A. Galleries was founded in 1938 by brothers Elkan Silberman († 1952) and Abris Silberman († 1968) from Austria. These brothers came from a Jewish family that already owned an art dealership in Vienna in 1780. In the 1920s, the Silberman brothers owned the E. & A. Silberman art dealership on the Figtengasse in Vienna.

However, after the Anschluss in 1938, their company was expropriated, after which the stock was partly sold and partly transferred to Hungary.

Fearing persecution, the Silbermans then left for the United States, where they founded a new art dealership in New York under the name E. & A. Silberman Galleries, Inc. They built a reputation as the art dealership "that had helped form museum collections", as well as the collections of G. H. A. Clowes (1877–1958), Dan Fellows Platt (1873–1938), Booth Tarkington (1869–1946), and L. M. Rabinowitz (1887–1957).

== Nazi-looted art ==
In 2000 the North Carolina Museum of Art discovered that its Cranach, Madonna and Child in a Landscape, had been looted by Nazis from the Jewish collector Philipp von Gomperz. Acquired by the Nazi governor of Vienna, Baldur von Schirach, it came into the possession of E. & A. Silberman Galleries, who sold it to an unsuspecting George and Marianne Khuner of Beverly Hills, California

In 2011, the Museum of Fine Arts in Boston restituted a painting that had been looted by the Nazis from the Jewish art collector Walter Westfeld. The MFA purchased the painting from E. and A. Silberman Galleries, New York, in December, 1941.
