= Madonna dei Bargellini =

Painting by Ludovico Carracci

The Madonna dei Bargellini
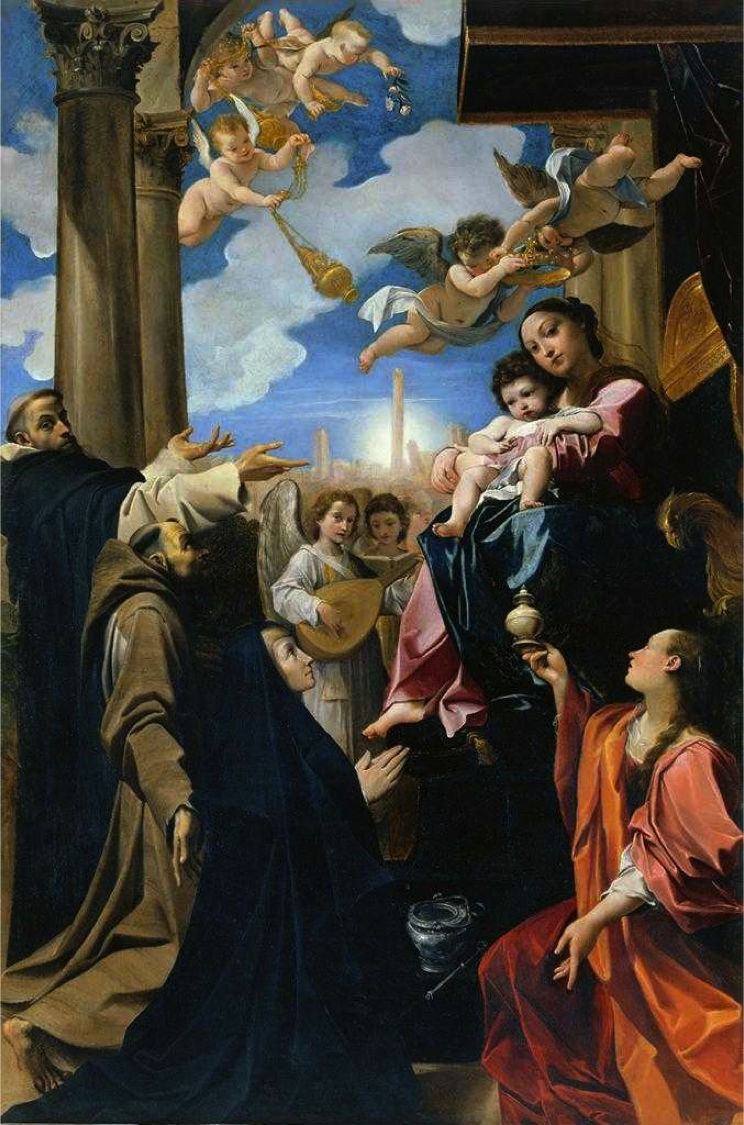
- Artist: Ludovico Carracci
- Year: 1588
- Medium: oil on canvas
- Dimensions: 282 cm × 188 cm (111 in × 74 in)
- Location: Pinacoteca Nazionale di Bologna, Bologna

The Madonna dei Bargellini, also known as the Pala Bargellini, is an oil-on-canvas altarpiece by the Italian painter Ludovico Carracci, from 1588. It is held in the Pinacoteca Nazionale di Bologna.

== History and description ==
This altarpiece, the first known signed and dated work by Ludovico, was commissioned by the senatorial Bargellini family for their chapel in the church of Santi Filippo e Giacomo, located on Via delle Lame #107 in Bologna. The church was affiliated with the adjacent Carmelite female convent "delle convertite" (formerly fallen women or prostitutes).

The large canvas, 282 by 188 cm, depicts an enthroned Madonna and child, accompanied by angels and cherubim, while before her in adoration are Saints Dominic (standing and seemingly explaining the apparition); Francis of Assisi (in brown woolen habit and in more ecstatic adoration), and the long-haired Mary Magdalen. Kneeling in prayer in the foreground among the saints is a portrait of Cecilia Bargellini Boncompagni as a Carmelite nun, including the detail of a mole above her right lip. Cecilia was related by family to Pope Gregory XIII, who had died in 1585. Mary is barefoot and gazing towards where onlookers would be. The child Jesus looks down to Cecilia. The armrest decoration on the Virgin's left is putatively a heraldic dragon symbol of the Bargellini. Above the Virgin, flying cherubs ease a jewelled crown on the virgin, while others waft incense or toss roses to her. In the background are the towers of Bologna with one angel playing lute and another singing.

The presence of the Magdalen, patron of fallen women, befits the intended locale for the painting. The incense being spread above and the silver holy water container with an aspergillum (aspersorio or holy water sprinkler) reinforce the goals of the order to provide a cleansed new life for fallen women.
