= Frieda Blell =

German painter (1874–1951)

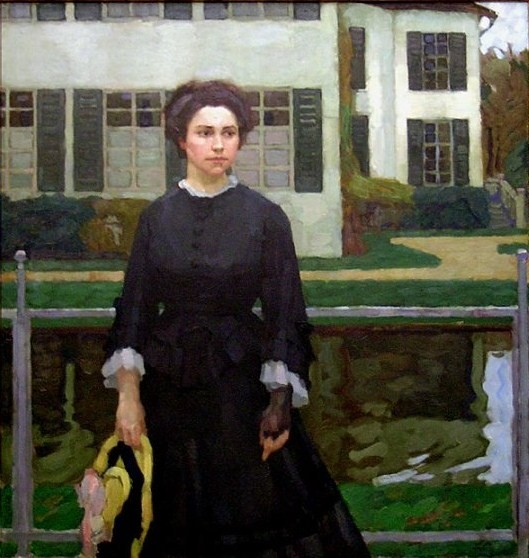
- Born: 4 September 1874; Brandenburg
- Died: 5 March 1951 (aged 76); Gauting
- Style: landscape painting
- Spouse: Leo Putz

Frieda Blell (4 September 1874, Brandenburg – 5 March 1951, Gauting) was a German landscape painter.

== Life ==
She was born to a long-established family of cloth merchants. Her father, Carl Blell, was a wholesale dealer, who served in the Reichstag and the Prussian Landtag. He was not sympathetic to her artistic ambitions so, in 1900, she struck out on her own to study art in Munich. There, she met the Expressionist painter, Leo Putz, and served as his model for several years. After 1909, they spent the Summers on the Chiemsee with their friends, the artist Clara Lotte von Marcard and her husband, the American painter Edward Cucuel. He also featured her in a few of his works, including "Herbstsonne", a depiction of the young Blell in the park by the lake shore near Castel Hartmannsberg.

In 1913, she and Putz were married. Two years later, their son Helmut was born. She continued to paint, mostly landscapes and pictures of flowers for Jugend (Youth), a magazine in Munich. In 1923, they moved to Gauting, where he specialized in nudes and scenes with boats. From 1929 to 1933, they lived in Rio de Janeiro, where Leo had been appointed a Professor. Following the Nazi takeover, he expressed opposition to the new régime, and his works were declared to be "degenerate". As a result, rather than return to Germany, they went to live in his hometown of Merano, Italy, where he died in 1940 following an operation. After the war, she returned to their old home in Gauting.
