= Philip Gomperz =

Austrian-German banker and politician

Philipp Gomperz

Personal details
- Born: 4 April 1860 Brno or Vienna, Austrian Empire
- Died: 3 December 1948 (aged 88) Montreux, Switzerland
- Education: University of Vienna
- Awards: Order of Franz Joseph

Philipp Gomperz, also known as Philipp von Gomperz (4 April 1860 – 4 December 1948), was an Austrian-German banker, art collector and politician.

== Biography ==
Gomperz was born in Vienna or Brno on 4 April 1860 into a Jewish family, active in business and political life in the 19th century. Gomperz's father was Max Israel Gomperz (1822–1913) and his mother Louisa Gomperz, née Auspitz (1832–1917). His uncle Julius Gomperz (1823–1909) was a member of the Vienna Reichstag, and another uncle Theodor Gomperz (1832–1912) was a philosopher and classical philologist. Julius' wife Caroline von Gomperz-Bettelheim (i.e., Philipp's aunt) was a pianist and singer. Philipp loved the singer Selma Kurz, but did not get permission from his father to marry her. He did not marry, so he was the last male member of the Gomperz family.

Philipp studied law at the University of Vienna, where he received his doctorate in 1883. From 1913, he was the sole owner of the family business L. Auspitz Enkel. The company produced cloth with the trademark of a falcon bearing a circle with the initials LAB (Lazar Auspitz Enkel). He was president of the Creditanstalt für Handel und Gewerbe. He participated in the social life in Vienna and collected art. In 1911, after acquiring half of the castle in Oslavany from his father, he housed his art collection there. Artist such as Emil Orlik were closely associated with the Gomperz family. He was awarded the Order of Franz Joseph (Grand Cross).

At the end of the 19th century, he became involved in high politics. In the provincial elections of 1896, Gomperz was elected to the Moravian Provincial Assembly, for the Curia of the Grand Landowners, II and was reelected in 1902, the provincial elections of 1906 and the provincial elections of 1913. In 1896, he was listed as a candidate of the Party of the Constitutionalist Grand Estate, which was centralist and pro-Vienna.

He also sat as a member of the House of Lords (the unelected upper house of the Reichstag).

After the First World War, he took Czechoslovak citizenship. However, he continued to own property in post-war Austria, including an apartment in the Palais Todesco in Vienna. A banker, Gomperz was the vice president of Böhmischen Escompte Bank and the Creditanstalt in Prague.

== Nazi persecution after Anschluss in 1938 ==
After Austria merged with Nazi Germany in the Anschluss, Gomperz was persecuted by the Nazis because of his Jewish heritage. His property was seized, including his art collection, which was transferred by the Gestapo to Gallery Herzig (also known as Galerie St. Lukas). He and his sisters fled to Switzerland via Prague.

After the war, he asked for his property to be returned, but it was confiscated again, now under the Beneš decrees. In 1998, the Czech government established a commission to address the issue of mitigation of property injustices caused to victims of the Holocaust.

In 1999, one of the artworks from the Gomperz looted collection was located at the North Carolina Museum of Art. Madonna and Child in a Landscape by Lucas Cranach the Elder was the object of a restitution settlement between Gomperz's heirs and the museum in 2008

== See also ==
- Vugesta
- The Holocaust in Bohemia and Moravia
- The Holocaust in Austria
- Aryanization
- List of claims for restitution for Nazi-looted art
