= Max Stern (gallery owner) =

German Jewish Canadian art dealer, persecuted by the Nazis (1904–1987)

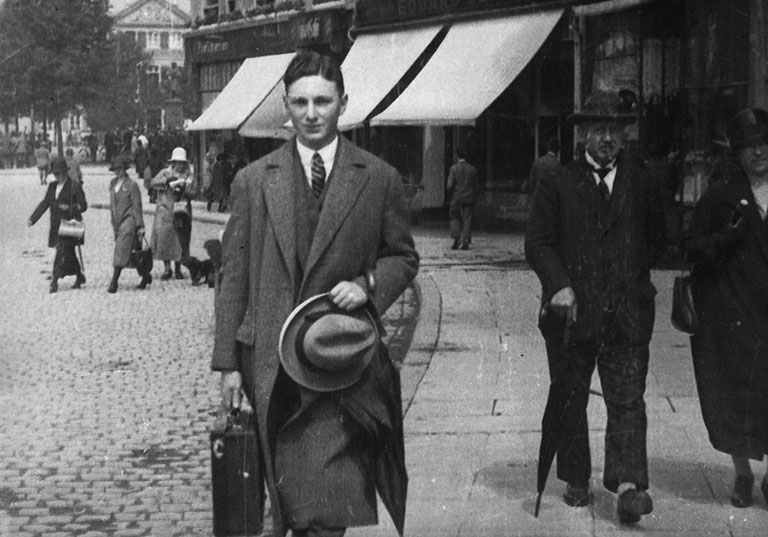
Max Stern in Germany, c. 1925

Max Stern (1904–1987) was a German-born art collector, dealer and philanthropist of Jewish heritage who fled Nazi persecution. He emigrated to London and then Canada.

In Germany, Stern owned the prestigious Galerie Stern in Düsseldorf. In 1937 he was forced by the Nazi Government to close his gallery. After many of the gallery's work were sold at auction or confiscated by the Nazis, he fled Germany to London where he was initially interned as an enemy alien for two years before being allowed to emigrate to Canada where he established Montreal's Dominion Gallery (in French, Galerie Dominion) and promoted young Canadian artists.

== Life before WWII ==
Max Stern was born in München-Gladbach (today's spelling: Mönchengladbach), Germany, in April 1904. His father, Julius Stern, was a German-born Jew who worked in the textile industry, before becoming an art collector and dealer in Düsseldorf. Stern studied in Cologne, Berlin, Vienna and Paris, earning his doctorate from the University of Bonn in 1928 before entering the art business. On the death of his father, in 1934, Max became the new gallery owner.

== Nazi-era ==
When the Nazis came into power in 1933, Stern was persecuted as a Jew. As anti-Jewish laws deprived him of rights, Stern prepared for exile, managing to open a gallery in London in 1935.

Under the Nazis, The Reich Chamber of Fine Arts withdrew professional accreditation, and Stern was given four weeks to either sell or dissolve all holdings within the Galerie Stern. His gallery was Aryanized, that is transferred to non-Jewish ownership in 1937 Stern was forced to auction off a large segment of the Stern Gallery by order of the Nazi government. These artworks were sold in Kunsthaus Lempertz. They went on the block by their lot number, Auktion 392. Not all pieces were sold, and Stern placed those that remained in storage with shipping agent Josef Roggendorf. Roggendorf held the artwork close to the Düsseldorf gallery until it was all confiscated by the National Socialist government.

Stern then spent several years trying to track down the 28 confiscated paintings. He placed an ad in the German art magazine Die Weltkunst, offering a reward for information on the paintings' locations. Recovering the paintings proved to be extremely difficult. Musical Party by Dirck Hals and Landscape with Figures by Salomon van Ruysdael were eventually recovered with help from the Canadian government after the war had ended. Last Judgment in the style of Hieronymus Bosch was returned in 1954. Other works were not found.

One of the paintings from the Stern collection, Jan Wellens de Cock’s "Flight into Egyp"t, reappeared on June 26, 1970 in London at the Christie's auction in London for “Highly Important Pictures from the collection formed by the late Chancellor Konrad Adenauer, the property of Heinz Kisters, Esq. and others.”

== Post-war ==
Stern fled Germany in December 1937, reportedly carrying nothing but a small suitcase. He hoped to join his sister at the gallery in London but after the war began was interred by the British as an enemy alien in a refugee camp on the Isle of Man for two years. The British government then allowed him to immigrate to Canada. Stern sailed on the Polish liner Sobieski, but was unable to get his money and belongings out of Britain. He then spent two years in internment camps in New Brunswick and Quebec. He was given refugee status upon his arrival. He took steps to be exempted from this status and made contact with the man who ran the Canadian Refugee Organization, William Birks, who immediately vouched for Stern.

Because of Stern's academic background and art dealing experience, he was named director of the Dominion Gallery of Fine Art. In January 1947, Stern and his wife became the sole proprietors of Gallery Dominion. He met his wife, a Swedish woman named Iris Westerberg, at the Canadian Refugee organization. Together, they made the gallery a focal point for the distribution of art by living Canadian artists. Both were known for promoting young and unknown Canadian art talents.

1944 was an especially important year for Stern's promotion of Canadian art. During this year, he held separate exhibitions featuring art by four members of the Group of Seven and Emily Carr.

Stern made many important contributions towards Canadian art culture. In the 1940s he provided a means for young Canadian artists to paint on a full-time basis by establishing a contract system. In this system, monthly payments are made to the artist in exchange for an agreed number of works. This method has since been used successfully in France, England and the United States.

In 1950, Stern moved the Dominion Gallery to a three-story building in a different area of Montreal. This new building allowed for 14 exhibition rooms and an apartment on the upper level where Stern and his wife would live. Jesus Carles de Vilallonga, a catalan born artist and, later, canadian citizen, was a frequent exibitor in this gallery. Jesús Carles de Vilallonga

== Legacy and restitution claims ==
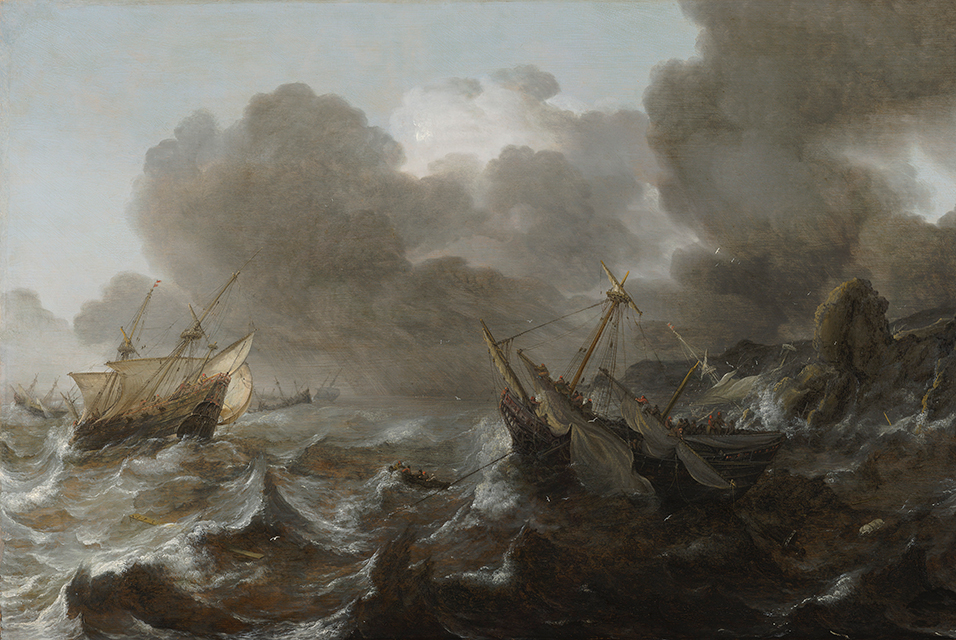
Ships in a Stormy Sea, painting by Jan Porcellis recovered in 2016 and now in the Frans Hals Museum

Upon leaving Europe, Stern raised the level of art appreciation in Canada. He began donating to Canadian institutions in the mid-1950s and gave generously to several museums across Canada. He was especially generous to Montreal institutions, donating over 166 works.

Stern died on a business trip in Paris in 1987.

Honors he received included an honorary doctorate from Concordia University in 1985. The gallery continued to operate for more than a decade after Stern's death, closing in December 2000.

The Max Stern Art Restitution Project was jointly created by the Hebrew University in Jerusalem, McGill University, Concordia University and the Holocaust Claims Processing Office in New York. The project's initiative has been to locate and recover works from the original Stern collection that were lost during the 1930s. The collection held an estimated 400 pieces in total.

In 2016, the Max Stern Restitution Project recovered two Dutch Old Masters paintings – Ships in Distress on a Stormy Sea by Jan Porcellis and Landscape with Goats by Willem Buytewech the Younger.

In 2017, a scheduled exhibition in Düsseldorf about Stern and the Restitution Project was abruptly cancelled due to local opposition, leading to intense controversy.

In 2018, Düsseldorf's Hargesheimer Auction House restituted Storm at Sea, by Johannes Hermanus Koekkoek (1778–1851) to representatives of the Max and Iris Stern Foundation and its three university beneficiaries — Concordia University and McGill University in Montreal and Hebrew University, Jerusalem. It was the 18th painting recovered on behalf of the Foundation.

In 2019 the Lempertz auction house settled a claim related to the 1937 forced sale of Happy Family in Garden by Otto Heichert (1868–1946).

== Selected donated art pieces ==
- Painting: Pensive girl. Artist: Prudence Heward. Donated to: The Montreal Museum of Fine Arts.
- Painting: The Flayed Woman. Artist: Paul-Emile Borduas. Donated to: The Montreal Museum of Fine Arts.
- Painting: Little Girl in Blue. Artist: Jori Smith. Donated to: The Montreal Museum of Fine Arts.
- Painting: Woman on a Sofa. Artist: Kees van Dongen. Donated to: The Montreal Museum of Fine Arts.
- Painting: Community House (Ucluelet). Artist: Emily Carr. Donated to: The Montreal Museum of Fine Arts.
