= Nicolas Neufchatel =

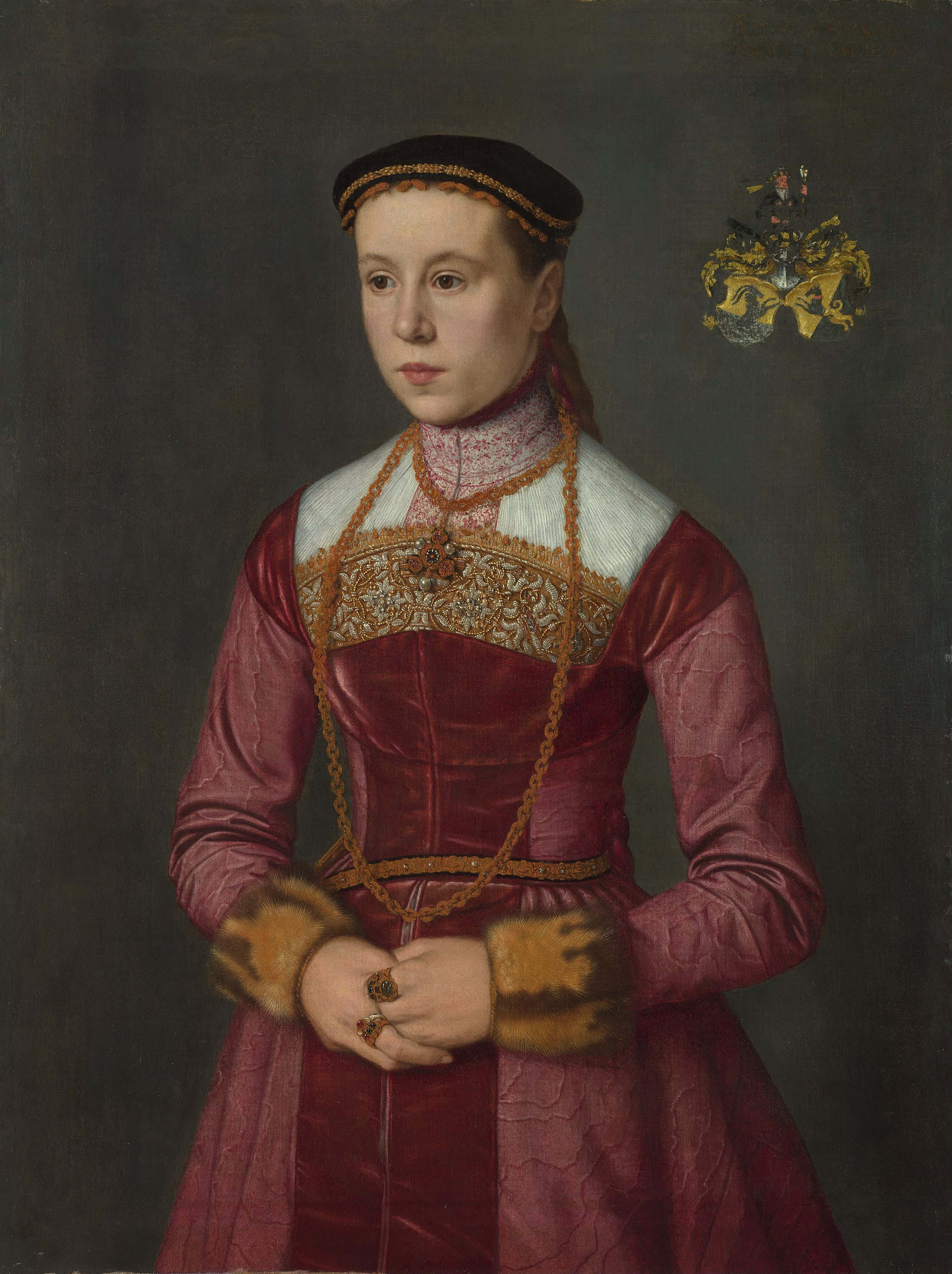
Nicolas Neufchatel, Portrait of a Young Lady, oil on canvas, 65.4 cm x 80.6 cm, c. 1561. National Gallery, London.

Nicolas Neufchatel or Neufchâtel (c. 1527 – c. 1590), known as Lucidel, was a Flemish painter and draughtsman. He worked in Germany and was noted as one of the leading portrait painters of the 1560s.

== Life ==
The earliest likely reference to Neufchatel occurs in the archives of the Antwerp's Guild of St. Luke, which list a 'Colyn van Nieucasteel' as a student of Pieter Coecke van Aelst in the year 1539. As a student in Antwerp, Neufchatel would have been introduced to the works of Frans Floris, Willem Key, and other masters of the 1540s. From 1561 to 1567 he lived in Nuremberg. It appears that he relocated to Germany for religious reasons, for on 23 July 1567, the city council ordered him not engage in any more Calvinist agitation. It is believed that he stayed in Nuremberg until at least 1573, the year he painted a portrait of Johan Gregor van der Schardt. After that year nothing is known of his life.
