= Ludovico Carracci =

Bolognese painter of the Baroque (1555–1619)

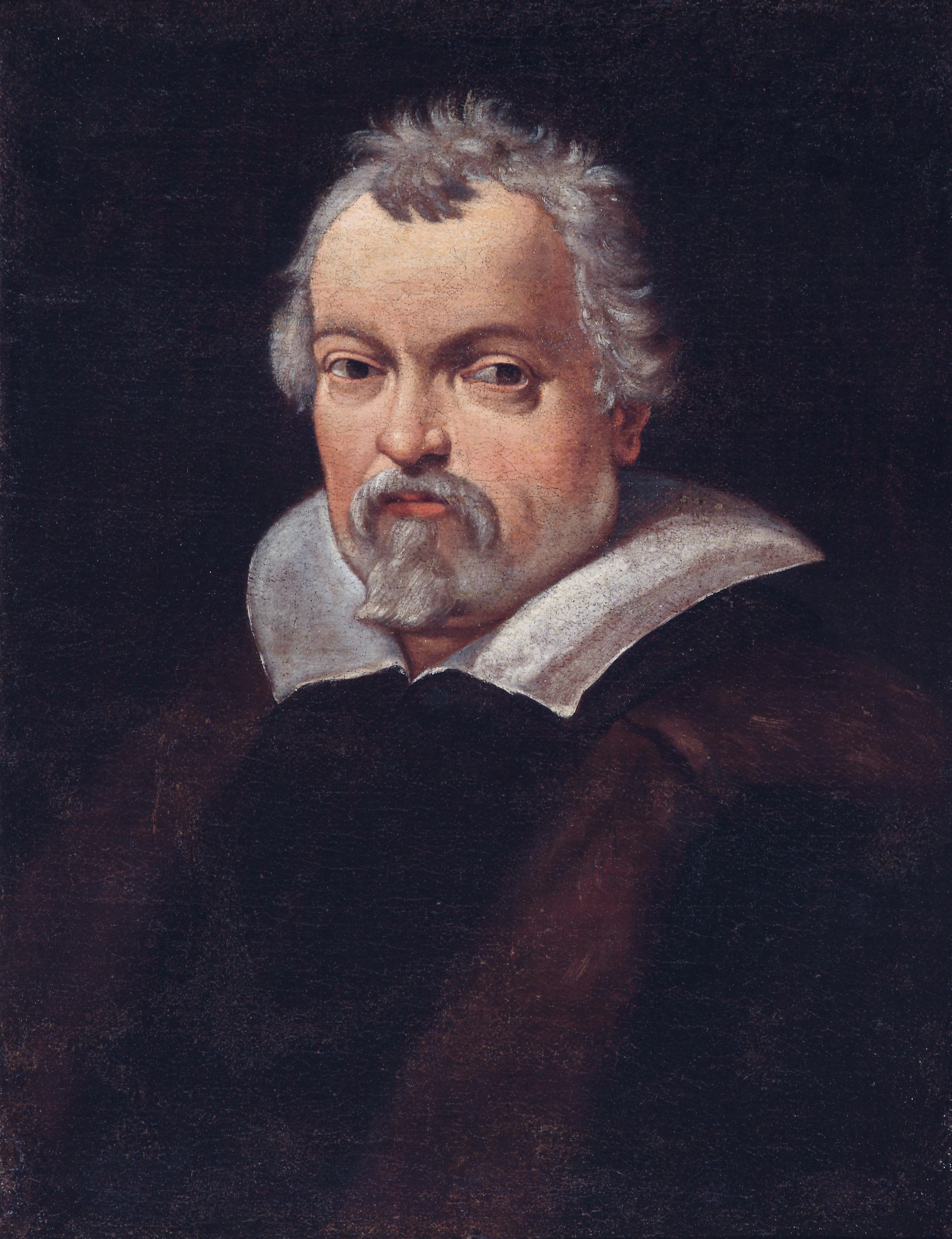
- Ludovico Carracci, in a 17th century portrait
- Born: 21 April 1555; Bologna, Papal States
- Died: 13 November 1619 (aged 64); Bologna, Papal States
- Education: Prospero Fontana
- Known for: Painting
- Movement: Baroque
- Relatives: Annibale Carracci (first cousin); Agostino Carracci (first cousin); Antonio Carracci (first cousin once removed); Francesco Carracci (first cousin once removed)

Ludovico (or Lodovico) Carracci (/kəˈrɑːtʃi/ kə-RAH-chee, UK also /kəˈrætʃi/ kə-RATCH-ee, Italian: [ludoˈviːko karˈrattʃi, lod-]; 21 April 1555 – 13 November 1619) was an Italian early-Baroque painter, etcher, and printmaker from Bologna. His works are characterized by a strong mood invoked by broad gestures and flickering light that create spiritual emotion and are credited with reinvigorating Italian art, especially fresco art, which was subsumed with formalistic Mannerism. He died in Bologna in 1619.

== Biography ==
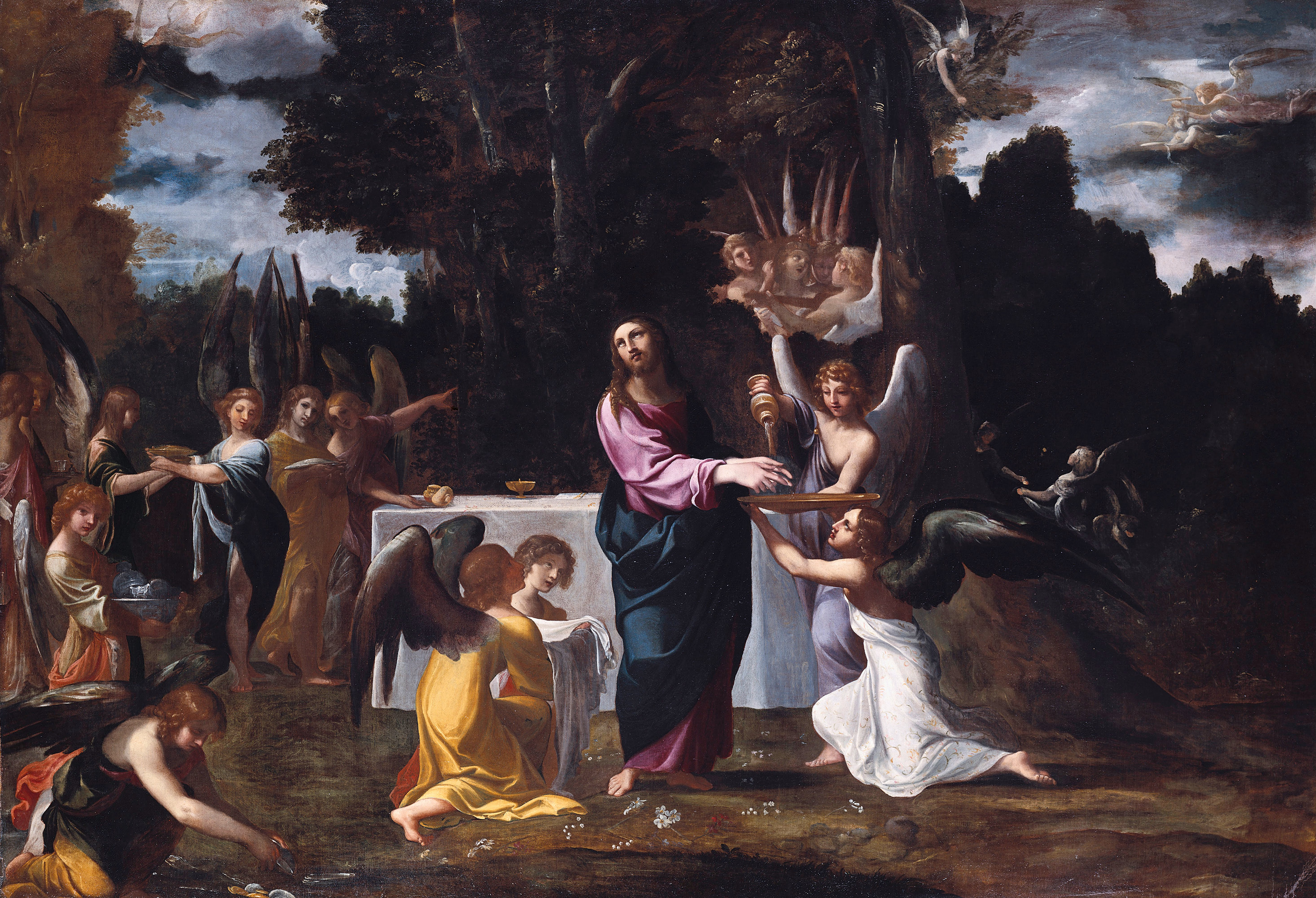
Ludovico Carracci - Christ in the Wilderness, Served by Angels

Ludovico apprenticed under Prospero Fontana in Bologna and traveled to Florence, Parma, and Venice, before returning to his hometown. Together with his cousins Annibale and Agostino Carracci, Ludovico worked in Bologna on the fresco cycles depicting Histories of Jason and Medea (1584) in Palazzo Fava, and the Histories of Romulus and Remus (1590-1592) for the Palazzo Magnani. Their individual contributions to these works are unclear, although Annibale, the younger than Ludovico by 5 years had gained fame as the best of the three. This led to Annibale's famed commission of the Loves of the Gods in the Palazzo Farnese in Rome. Agostino joined Annibale there briefly.

While Ludovico remained in Bologna, this does not mean that he was any less influential, the biography of Lanzi states that around 1585, Ludovico and his cousins had founded the so-called Eclectic Academy of painting (also called the Accademia degli Incamminati). More recent conjectures are that there was no established Academy with curriculum, but that Ludovico tutored many in his studio.

This studio however propelled a number of Emilian artists to pre-eminence in Rome and elsewhere, and singularly helped encourage the so-called Bolognese School of the late 16th century, which included Albani, Guercino, Sacchi, Reni, Lanfranco and Domenichino. The Carracci had their apprentices draw studies focused on observation of nature and natural poses, and use a bold scale in drawing figures. Two of Ludovico's main pupils were Giacomo Cavedone and Francesco Camullo.

== Restitution ==
In 2009, Carracci's painting of St. Jerome (c. 1595) was restituted to the heirs of Max Stern, a German Jewish art dealer persecuted and looted by the Nazis.

Ludovico Carracci's works

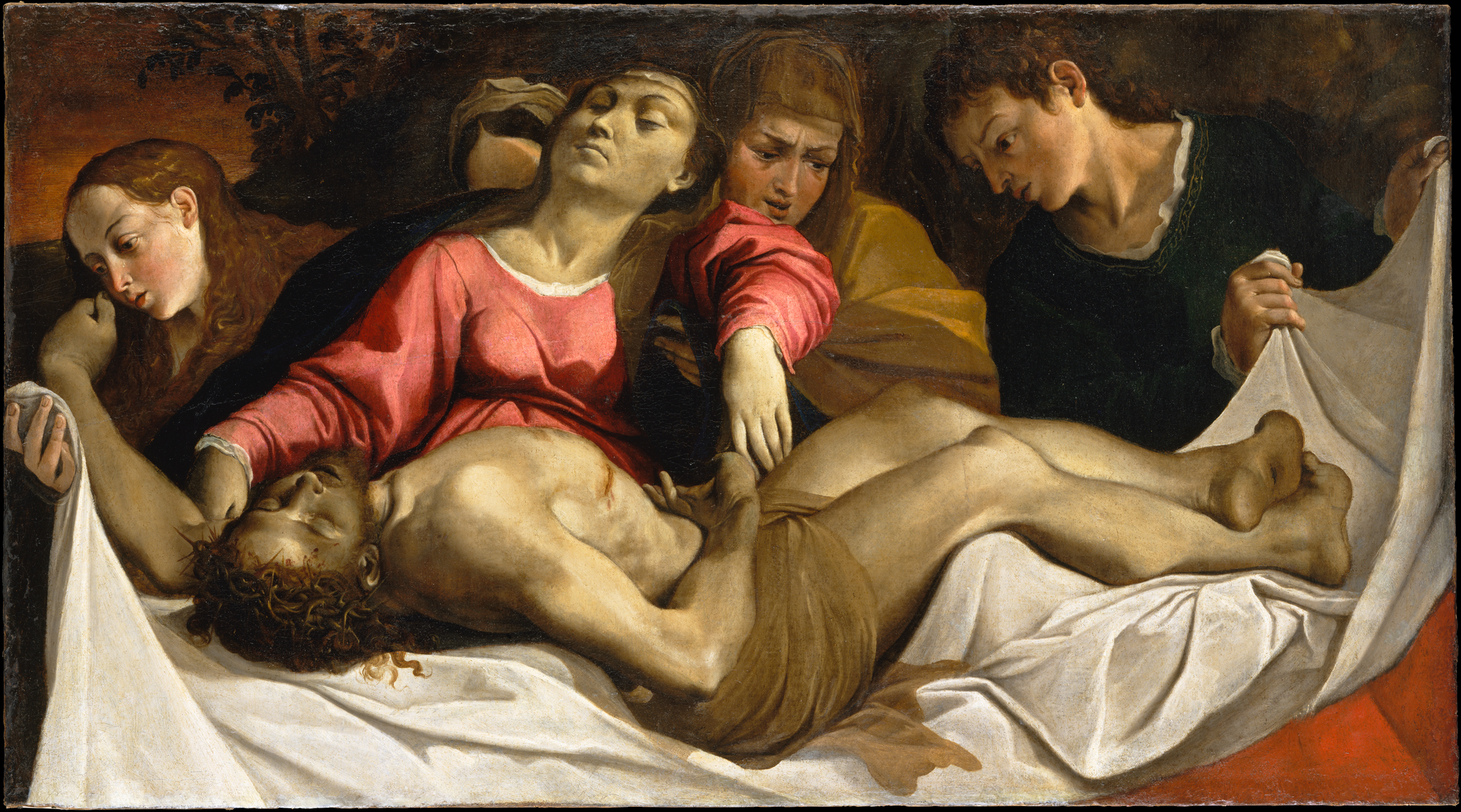
Lamentation of Christ (ca. 1582)

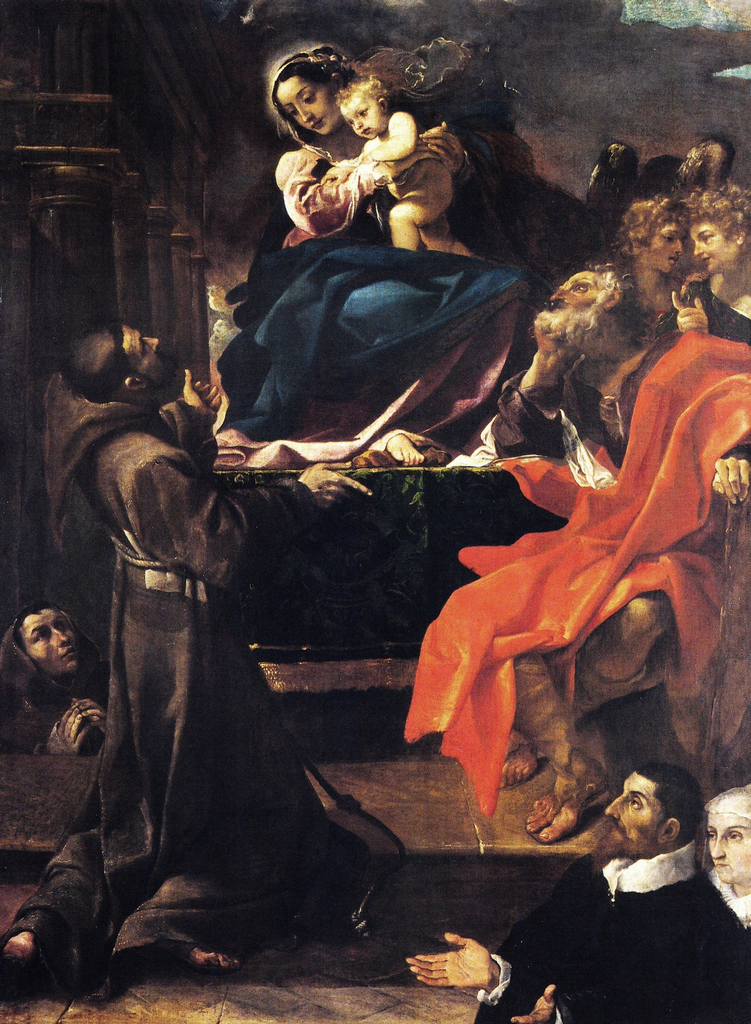
Madonna and Child with St Francis of Assisi (1591) – known as "La Carraccina" due to the admiration of the young Guercino

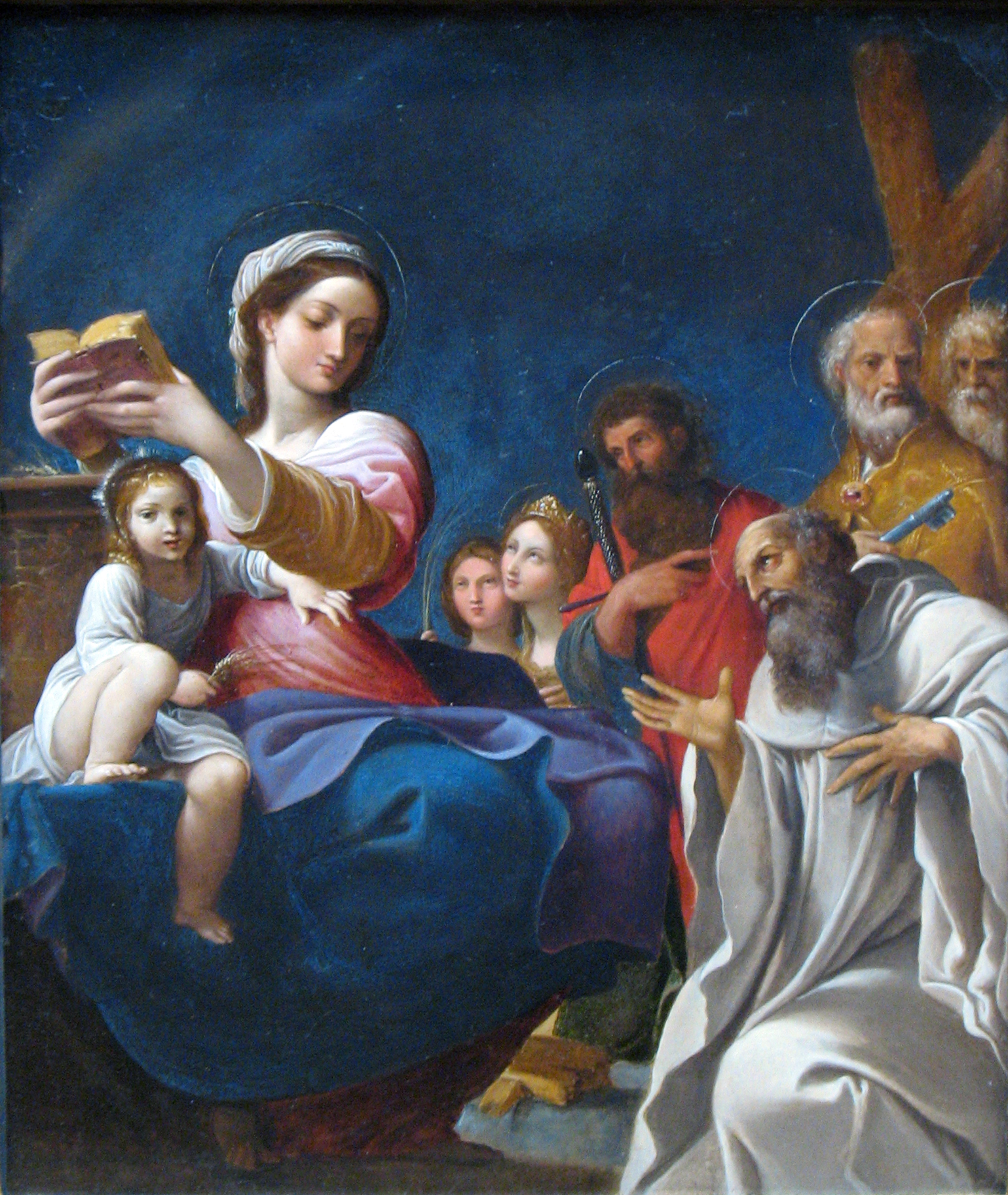
Madonna and Child with Saints

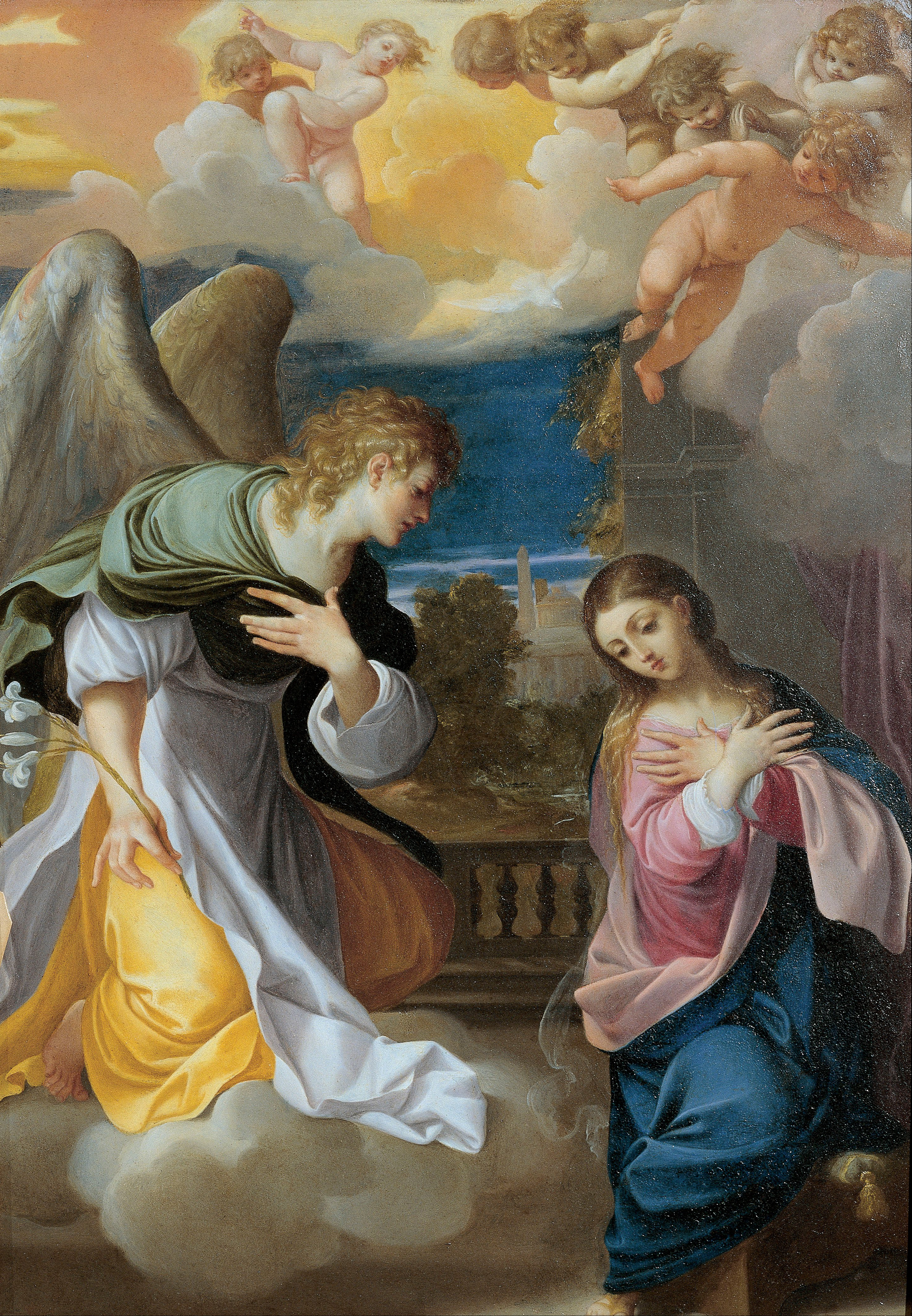
Annunciation

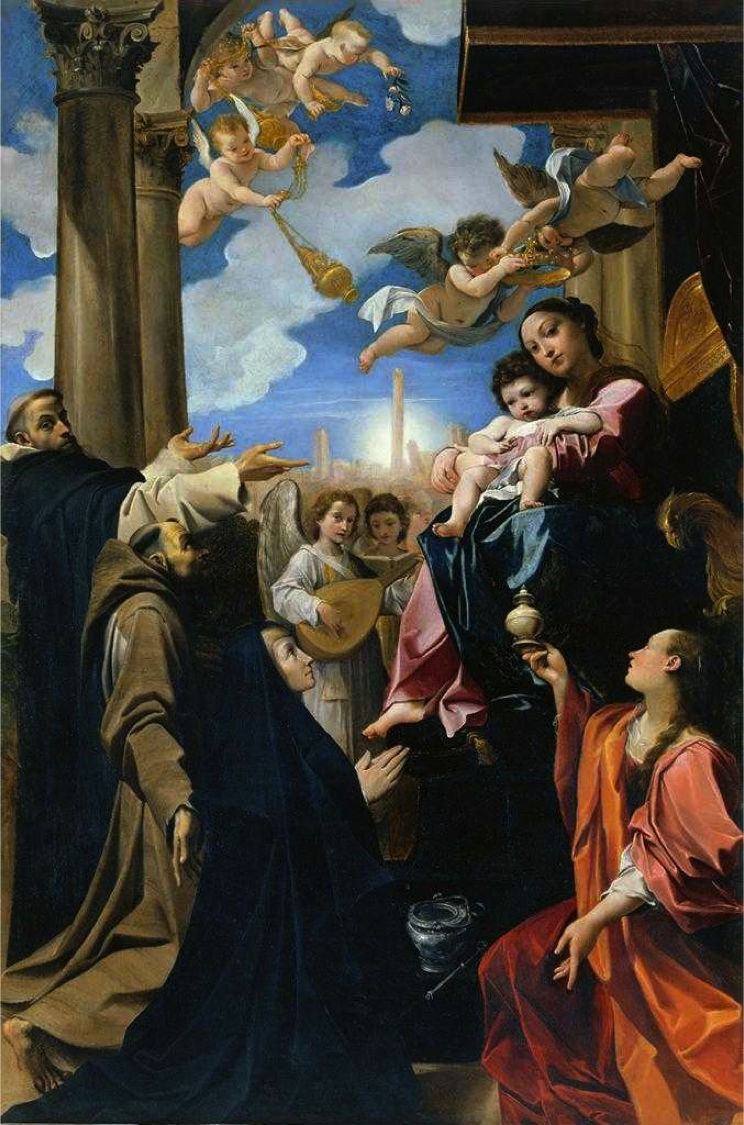
Madonna dei Bargellini (1588)

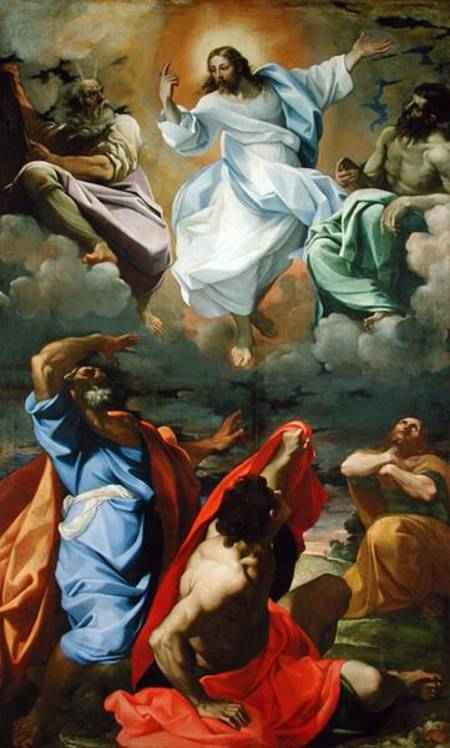
Transfiguration (1595)

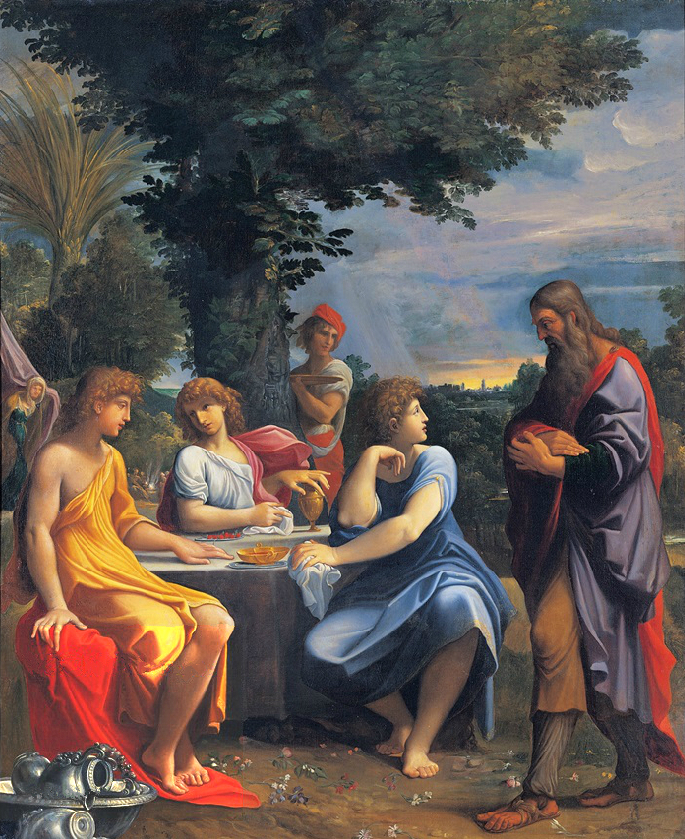
Abraham and the Three Angels

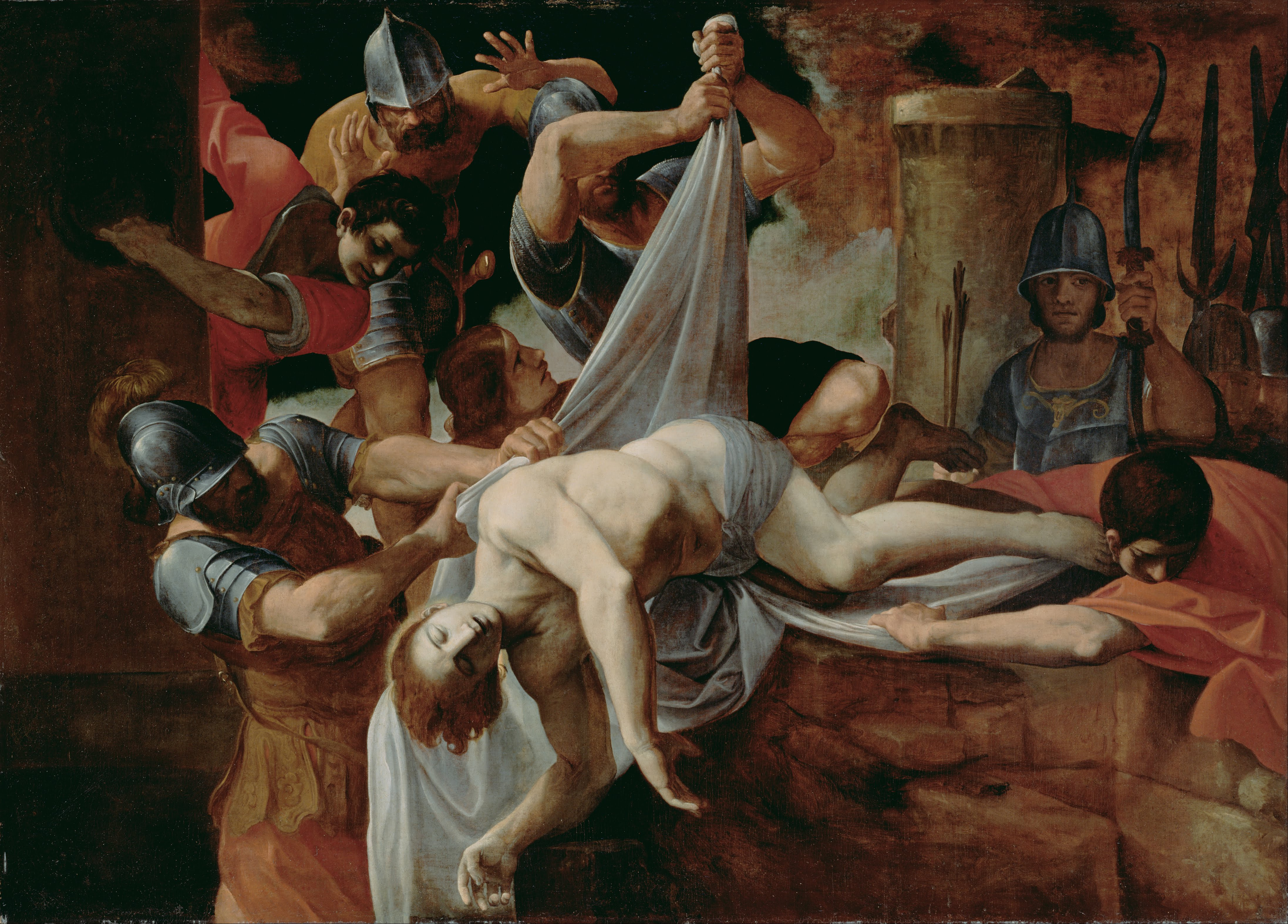
Saint Sebastian Thrown into the Cloaca Maxima

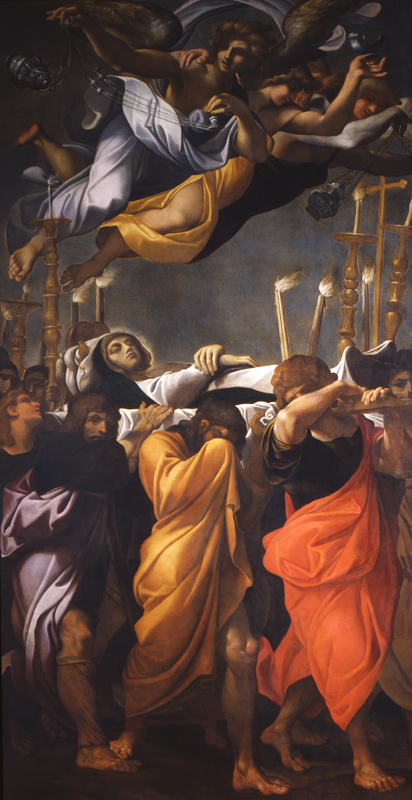
The Funeral of the Virgin Mary

== Sources ==
- Babette Bohn, Ludovico Carracci and the Art of Drawing Brepols 2004
- Allessandro Brogi, Ludovico Carracci Bologna 2001
- Andrea Emiliani (ed.), Ludovico Carracci exh. cat. Bologna-FortWorth 1994 (with Essay and catalogue by Gail Feigenbaum)
