= Edward Cucuel =

American-German painter

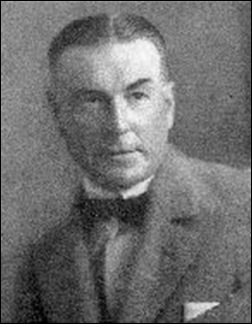
- Cucuel, c.1913
- Born: August 6, 1875; San Francisco, California
- Died: April 18, 1954 (aged 78); Pasadena, California
- Occupation: Painter

Edward Cucuel (August 6, 1875 – April 18, 1954) was an American-born painter who lived and worked in Germany.

== Life and work ==
Born in San Francisco, Cucuel was the son of a German newspaper publisher. At the age of fourteen he was already attending the San Francisco Art Institute and doing illustrations for The Examiner. At the age of seventeen, he went to Paris where he attended the Académie Julian and the Académie Colarossi, finishing at the Académie des Beaux-Arts under Jean-Léon Gérôme. When he came back to the United States in 1896, he briefly worked as a newspaper illustrator in New York, but returned to France and Italy to acquaint himself with the old masters at first hand. He ended up in Germany in 1899, where he worked as a free-lance newspaper illustrator in Berlin and Leipzig.

In 1904, after working as a reporter at the St. Louis World's Fair, Cucuel decided to take a trip around the world, visiting Japan, China and Sri Lanka. Following a brief stay in San Francisco to visit his family after the earthquake, he settled in Munich in 1907. It was there that he became a friend of the German painter, Leo Putz, and was introduced to plein-air painting. He also became a member of the Munich Secession. In 1913, he became a member of the Société Nationale des Beaux-Arts and exhibited with the Salon d'Automne. That same year, he married Clara Lotte von Marcard, a friend of Putz and his wife, Frieda Blell. During the First World War, he lived in Holzhausen on the Ammersee, later establishing studios in Munich and Starnberg, his father's hometown. From 1928 to 1939, he commuted between there and New York, where he spent the winters. The beginning of World War II forced him to leave Germany for good in 1939. He settled in Pasadena, California, where he lived until his death in 1954.

His style was generally impressionistic and his favorite subjects were idyllic outdoor scenes with young women. His works may be seen at the Chicago Art Institute, the National Academy in New York, and the Carnegie Institute of Pittsburgh, as well as many other places in the U.S. and Europe.
