= Egbert van der Poel =

Dutch Golden Age painter

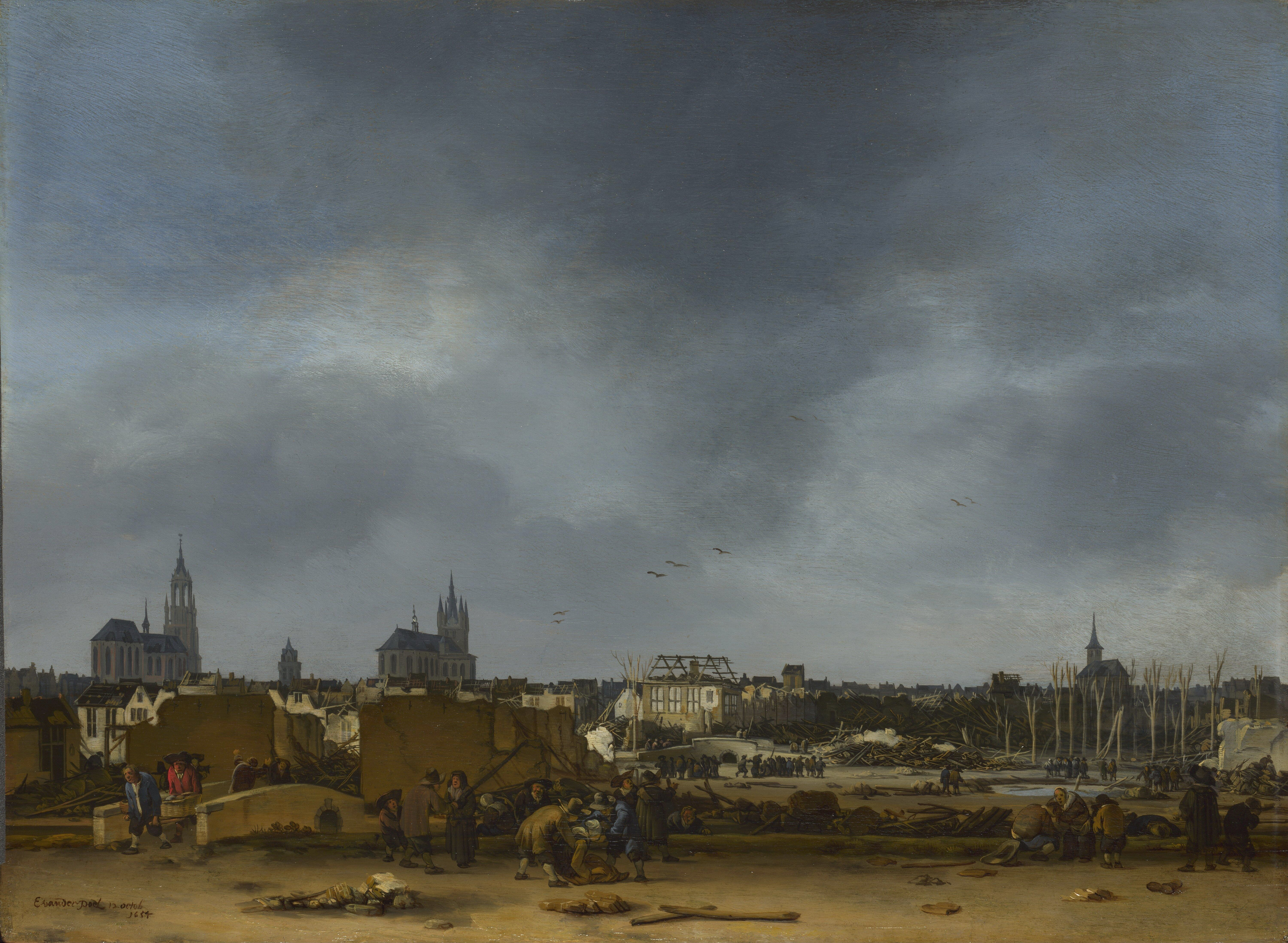
- Delft Explosion of 1654, c. 1654
- Born: 9 March 1621; Delft, Dutch Republic
- Died: 19 July 1664 (aged 43); Rotterdam, Dutch Republic
- Known for: Painting
- Movement: Dutch Golden Age painting

Egbert van der Poel (9 March 1621 – 19 July 1664) was a Dutch Golden Age genre and landscape painter.

== Life ==
Van der Poel was born in Delft, the son of a goldsmith, and may have been a student of Esaias van de Velde and of Aert van der Neer. According to the RKD he was the brother of the painter Adriaen Lievensz van der Poel and a student of Cornelis Saftleven in Rotterdam. Van der Poel was registered with the Guild of St Luke in Delft on 17 October 1650, where he is listed as a landscape painter. In 1651 van der Poel married Aeltgen Willems van Linschooten in Maassluis, near Rotterdam. His most famous paintings depict the Delft gunpowder explosion of 12 October 1654 and its aftermath; he and his wife were living in the area at the time. Egbert and Aeltgen van der Poel had a son and three daughters. He died in Rotterdam in 1664.
