= Christian van der Goes =

Dutch nobleman

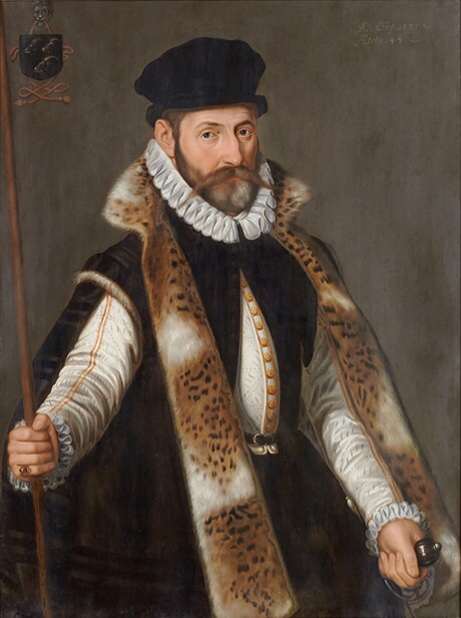
- Portrait by Pieter Pourbus of Christian van der Goes holding his staff of office

Schout of Delft
- In office 1562–1577
- Preceded by: Vrank Bartholomeusz. van Diemen
- Succeeded by: Willem van Dorp

Christiaan or Christian van der Goes (1530s, Delft – 22 September 1600), a Dutch nobleman, was schout of Delft from 1562 to 1577.

Christian was the son of Adriaan van der Goes, Land's Advocate of Holland (died 5 November 1560), and Anna van Spangen (died 14 April 1548). In 1558 he married Anna van Renoy, and the couple were to have seven children:

1. Adriaan, councillor to the Prince of Orange
2. Maria
3. Anna
4. Gerard Renoy, who died 8 August 1623 after serving many years in the Army of Flanders
5. Laurens, who died at Vlissingen of wounds suffered in the Siege of Ostend
6. Aernout, a canon and member of St. Michael's Abbey, Antwerp
7. Kornelis

He was appointed schout (representative of royal authority) for Delft in 1562, and initially kept his position on the city executive at the change of government in Delft in 1572 (see Dutch Revolt). As one of the heirs of Cornelis Musius, an important clergyman killed in December 1572, he managed to obtain the release of Musius's sequestered library. A loyal Catholic, he was forced out of office in 1577.
