= Lancelot Blondeel =

Flemish painter (1498–1561)

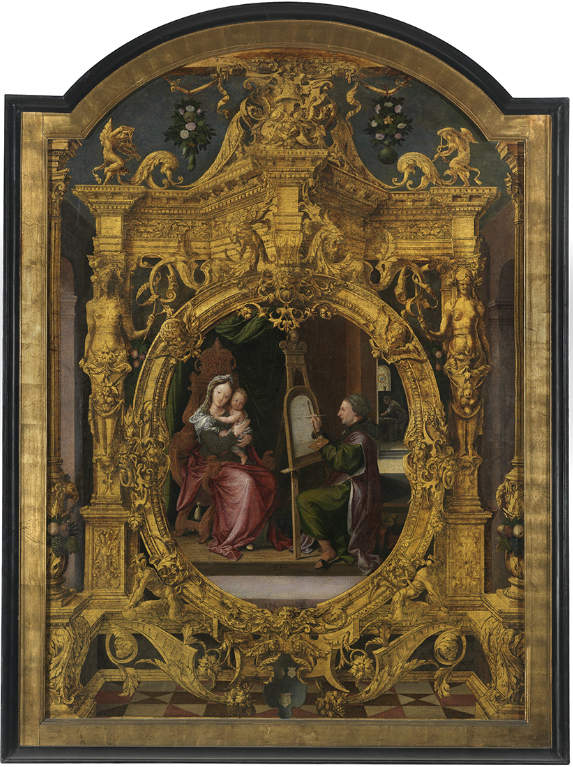
Saint Luke paints the Virgin, Groeningemuseum, 1545

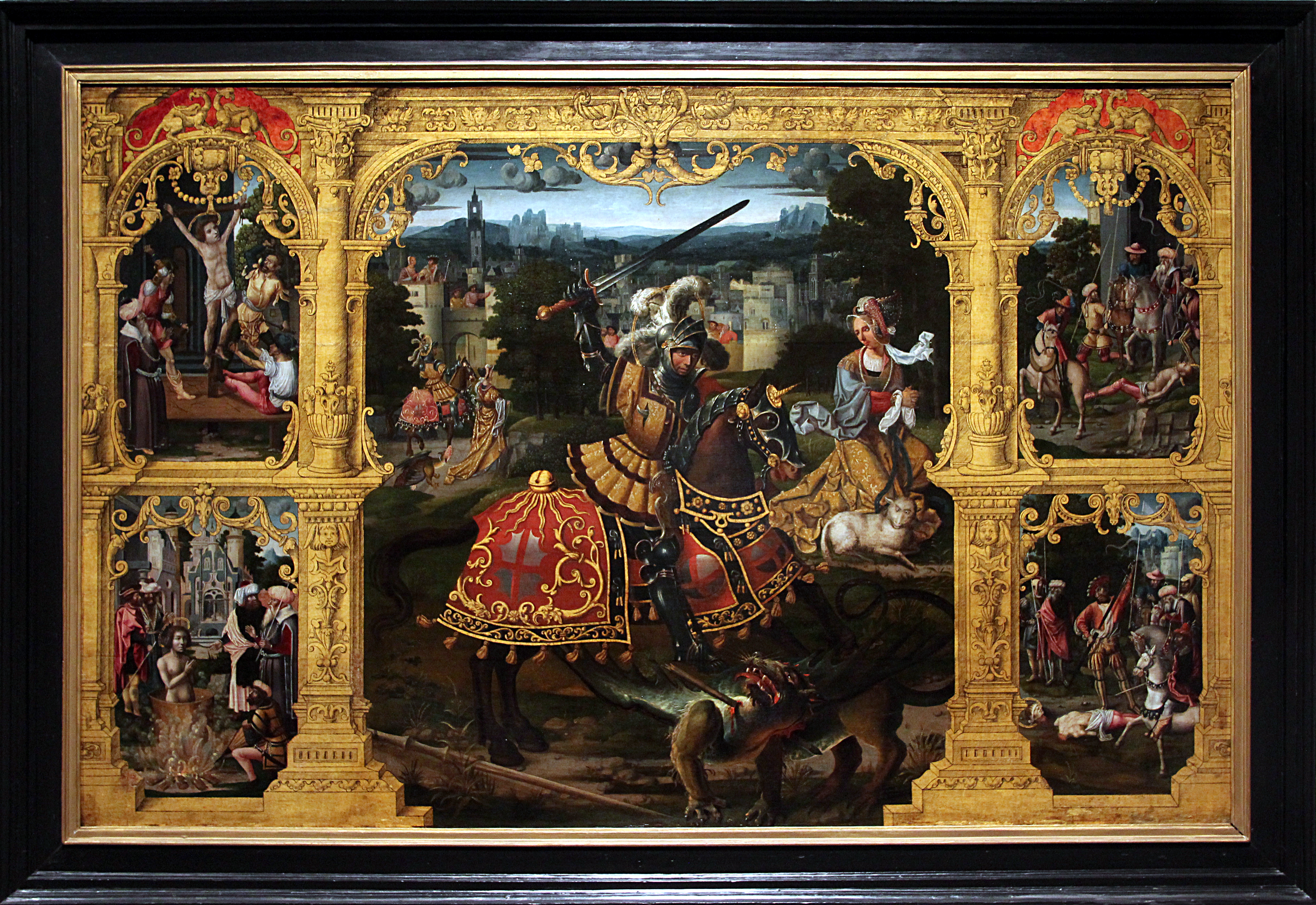
The Legend of Saint George, Groeningemuseum, c. 1535-1545.

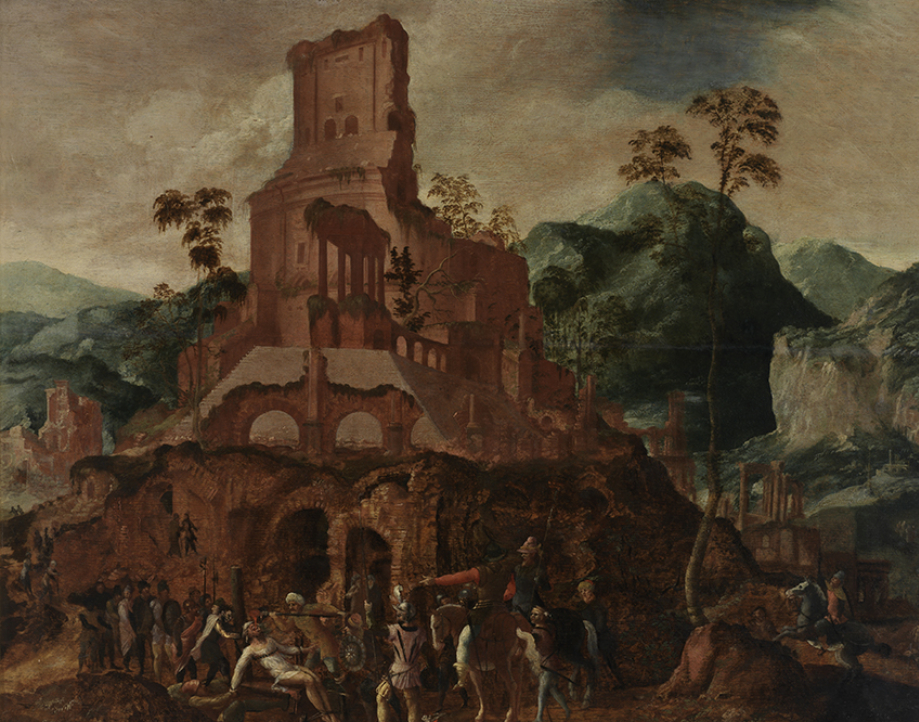
The death of Marcus Licinius Crassus, Groeningemuseum, c. 1548-1558.

Lancelot Blondeel, also Lanceloot (1498 – 4 March 1561), was a Flemish artist active in Bruges. He worked as a painter, architect, city planner, surveyor and cartographer, and designed sculptures, tapestries and jewelry.

== Life ==
Blondeel was born in Poperinge, and established himself as an artist in Bruges. He became a member of the Guild of Saint Luke in 1519.

He trained Pieter Pourbus, who married his daughter Anna in 1543 and eventually took over his atelier.

He primarily painted commissioned religious themed works for local churches. In 1550 Blondeel and Jan van Scorel were commissioned to restore Jan van Eyck's celebrated Ghent Altarpiece.

He made in 1549 on a commission by Charles V, Holy Roman Emperor, two triumphal arches, based on the Roman style. He also designed a canal that linked Bruges to the sea, a project that greatly promoted Bruges' trade.

Blondeel died in Bruges on 4 March 1561.

== Works ==
- Triptych with the Saints Cosmas and Damian, Bruges, Sint-Jacobskerk (1523)
- Triptych with the History of the Holy Cross, Veurne, Sint-Niklaaskerk
- The Seven Joys of Our Lady, Tournai, cathédrale Notre-Dame (perhaps in collaboration with Pieter Pourbus)
- Martyrdom of a Saint, New York City, private collection (1548 or 1558)
- Calvary, Nantes, Musée des Beaux-Arts
- Virgin and Child with Saint Luke and Saint Eligius, Bruges, Sint-Salvatorskathedraal (1545)
- Saint Luke painting the Virgin, Bruges, Groeningemuseum (1545)
- The Good Samaritan, Bruges, Sint-Janshospitaal

== Bibliography (unreferenced) ==
- W.H.J. Weale, 'Lancelot Blondeel', The Burlington Magazine 14 (1908), pp. 96–101, 160–166
- W.H.J. Weale, 'Lancelot Blondeel, Pictor Brugensis Praestantissimus', The Burlington Magazine 18 (1911), p. 297 (review)
- J. Duverger, E. Roobaert, 'Lancelot Blondeel (1498–1561). Zijn rol en betekenis', Gentse bijdragen tot de kunstgeschiedenis en de oudheidkunde 18 (1959–'60), pp. 95–105
- K.G. Bon, 'Lancelot Blondeel as a designer for sculpture and textiles', Hafnia. Copenhagen papers in the history of art no. 4, 1976, pp. 113–123
- B.C. van den Boogert, 'De triomfen van de keizer. De verheerlijking van Karel V en de toepassing van antieke motieven in de Nederlandse kunst', in: B.C. van den Boogert, J. Kerkhoff e.a., cat.tent. Maria van Hongarije. *Koningin tussen keizers en kunstenaars, 1505–1558, Utrecht (Museum Catharijneconvent) / 's-Hertogenbosch (Noordbrabants Museum) 1993, pp. 220–268
- 'Bijzondere aanwinst voor het groeningemuseum. Lanceloot Blondeel, "De dood van Generaal Crassus", midden 16de eeuw', Brugge Stedelijke en Museumvrienden Bulletin 20 (2000), no. 2, p. 16
- L. Jansen, 'Lanceloot Blondeel en de Generale Reglen de architecturen van Pieter Coecke van Aelst', Desipientia 9 (2002), no. 1, pp. 6–41
- Witting, Felix (1917). Lancelot Blomdeel. Strassbourg: J. H. E. Heitz (Heitz & Mündel).
