= Pieter Pourbus =

Dutch-born Flemish Renaissance painter

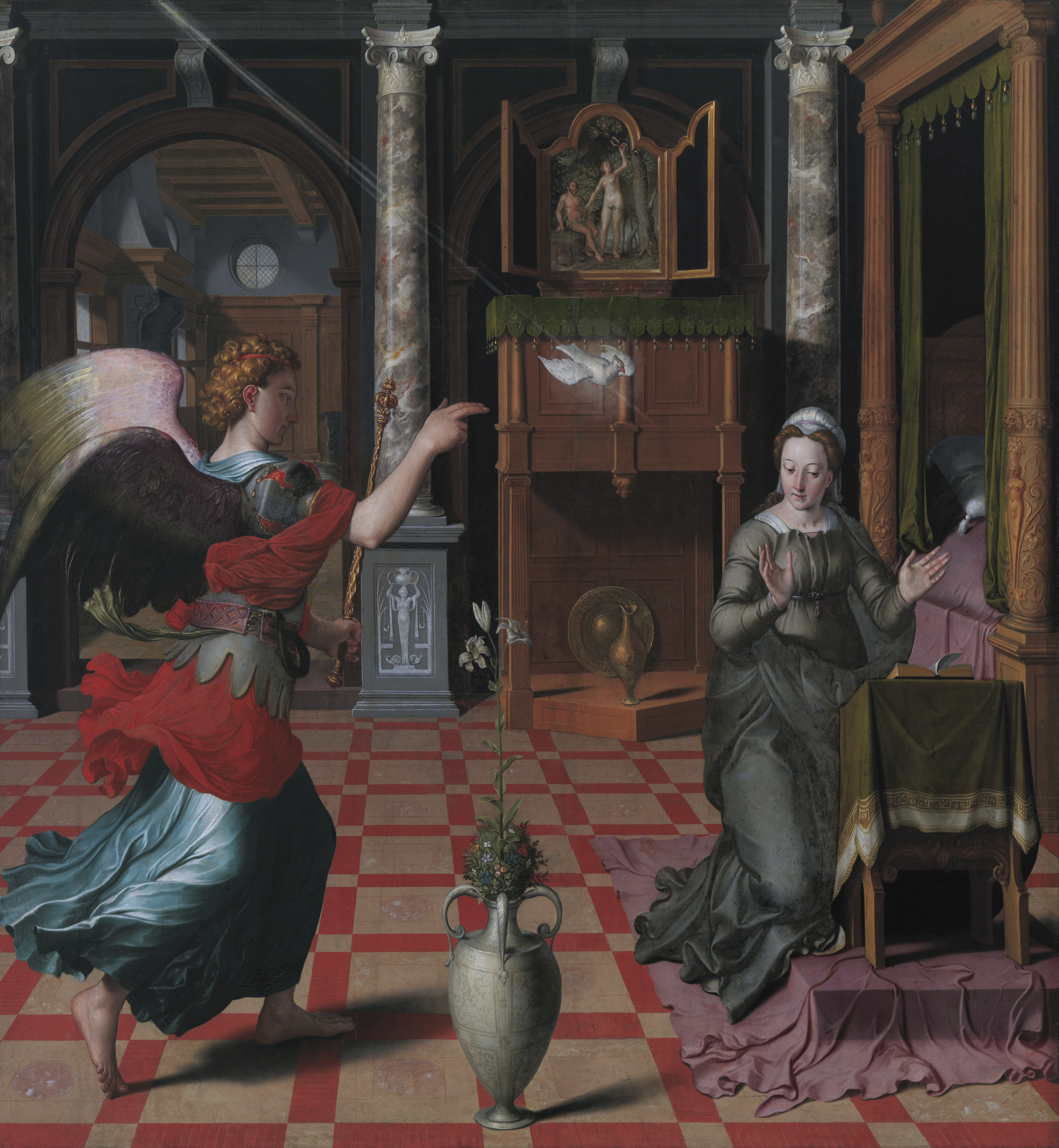
The Annunciation, 1552, oil on panel, 117 × 112 cm, signed and dated : "PETRVS POVRBVS ME FECIT", dated on the center of the armoire: "1552", Museum Gouda, Netherlands

Pieter Jansz. Pourbus (c. 1523–1584) was a Flemish Renaissance painter, draftsman, engineer and cartographer who was active in Bruges during the 16th century. He is known primarily for his religious and portrait paintings.

Born in Gouda in 1523 or 1524. He moved to Bruges at the age of 20. Very little is known of his childhood and youth while living in Gouda; contemporary artists such as Karel Van Mander only make a brief mention of his origins in the city.

== Early years in Gouda ==
His first biography was written by contemporary artist biographer Karel van Mander in his renowned Schilder-boeck (Book of Painters) of 1604, starting: "(...) I would not like to conceal any of the most special. That is why I wish to present Pieter Pourbus". Van Mander remembers him as "the painter of Bruges". The two met in 1580, when Van Mander fled the ravages of the Eighty Years' War and stayed in Bruges for a time. Pourbus must have overwhelmed Van Mander with information about all of the sights of Bruges at that time, as he was the source for most of the information Van Mander provides regarding the Bruges school of painting.

At the time, Pourbus was not considered a native in Bruges itself. When he registered as a master painter with the guild of Sculptors and Saddlers in 1543 as "Pieter Jansyns Poerbus", he is noted as a "stranger" ('vrymde') in the records. He was 19 or 20 years old at the time, based on the mentions of his age in a number of documents. From there, we can deduce that he must have been born in 1523 or 1524. At the occasion of the exhibition on Pieter Pourbus at the Museum Gouda in 2018, Paul Abels wrote in the catalogue of this exhibition about the role Gouda played in his life by putting what little is known about his ties to the city in the context of late-medieval religious and social life in Gouda.

Abels has mentioned that the name 'Pourbus' features several times in Gouda at the start of the sixteenth century, but he adds that there is only one person in the Gouda city archives, a man named Jan Pieterssoen Pourbus, who could actually qualify as Pourbus' father. City accounts mention a payment made to him for "painting the board that stands in front of the window" in 1529. The mention is brief, but it corroborates Van Mander's claim about Pourbus' Gouda roots by another contemporary source. In addition, this source shows that his father was also a painter, although it is not possible to know what his real artistic skills were. The mention most likely refers to painting the town's coat of arms on a shutter.

== From Gouda to Bruges ==
Pourbus' moved to Bruges, perhaps because Bruges was known to be a city that produces excellent painting, although that reputation was waning when Pourbus arrived.

Bruges was familiar territory for Gouda residents. Pourbus would have heard many stories about the city of Bruges when growing up. The two cities were closely connected by the beer trade, which was the leading line of business in Gouda at the time. Before he went to Bruges, he may have studied his craft with Utrecht-based painters such as Jan van Scorel or the Leiden masters. Recent technical research suggests Leiden, more so than Utrecht.

Lucas van Leyden and Cornelis Engelbrechtsz died when Pourbus was still a child, but he may have come into contact with Engelbrechtsz's three sons, Cornelis, Lucas, and Pieter Cornelisz Kunst, who followed in their father's footsteps and became painters in their own right.

== Pourbus in Bruges ==
Shortly after he registered with the Bruges Guild of Saint Luke, Pieter Pourbus married Anna, the youngest daughter of painter Lancelot Blondeel. His marriage to the daughter of an established artist lacking any male heirs became very important for his reputation and further career as a painter. In 1545 or 1546, Pourbus' son, Frans ('the Elder'), was born, who later became a prominent artist in his own right.

Pourbus became a member of the Crossbowmen's Guild of St George and often visited the rhetorician meetings organised by the Chamber of the Holy Spirit. Blondeel, who was a well-respected person there, may have introduced him. Otherwise, very few concrete details of Pourbus' first few years in Bruges are known. It would appear that he initially operated as a student of Blondeel.

=== Working in Blondeel's studio ===
It remains unclear in some cases whether paintings from this period were the result of collaboration between Pourbus and Blondeel, or whether they were painted by Pourbus alone. An example of this is the painting The Seven Joys of the Virgin (c.1546), which today hangs in the Tournai Cathedral

Pourbus' smaller work The Last Supper indicates that his father-in-law also introduced him to the 'Rederijker' or rhetorician circles of amateur poets and reciting artists. It depicts the Last Supper as described in the Refrains of the rhetorician Edward dan Dene. The idea that this painting was inspired to Pourbus by the rhetoricians plays was confirmed when the smaller Last Supper from 1548 surfaced in 2000 and could be linked by Samuel Mareel to the Chamber of the Holy Spirit. The iconography is also noticeable, with the figure of a devil entering the room on the right of the painting.

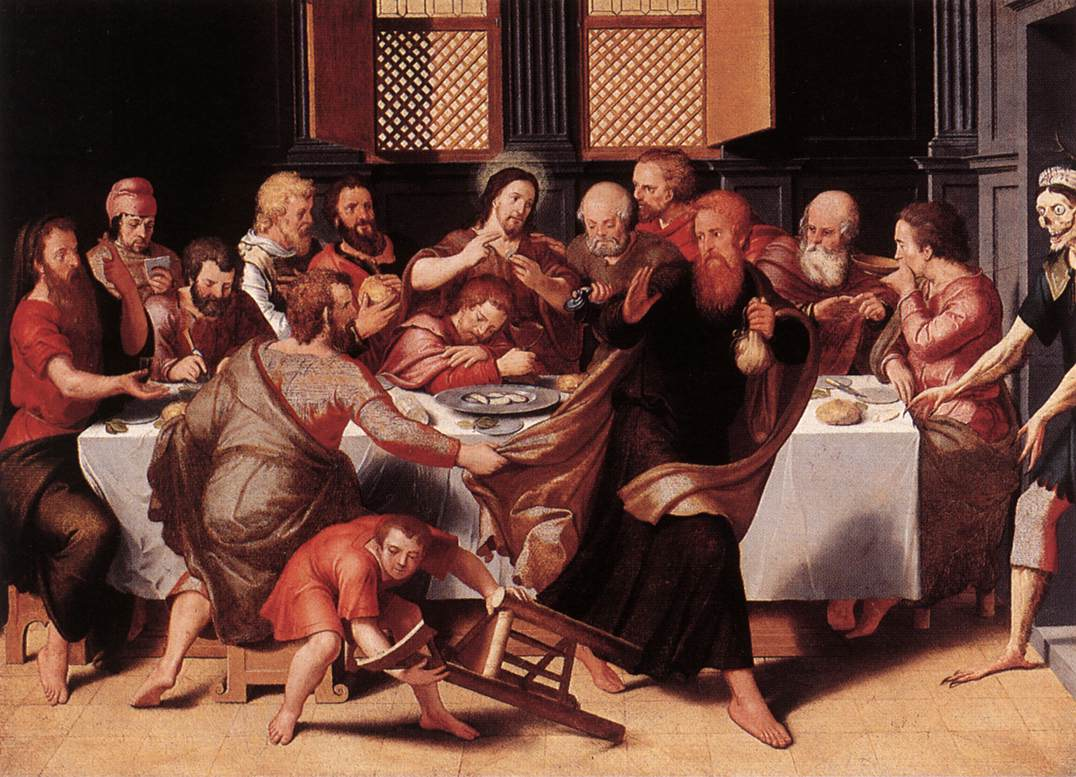
The Last Supper (inscription above the door jamb: 1548), 46.5 × 63 cm, Groeningemuseum, Bruges

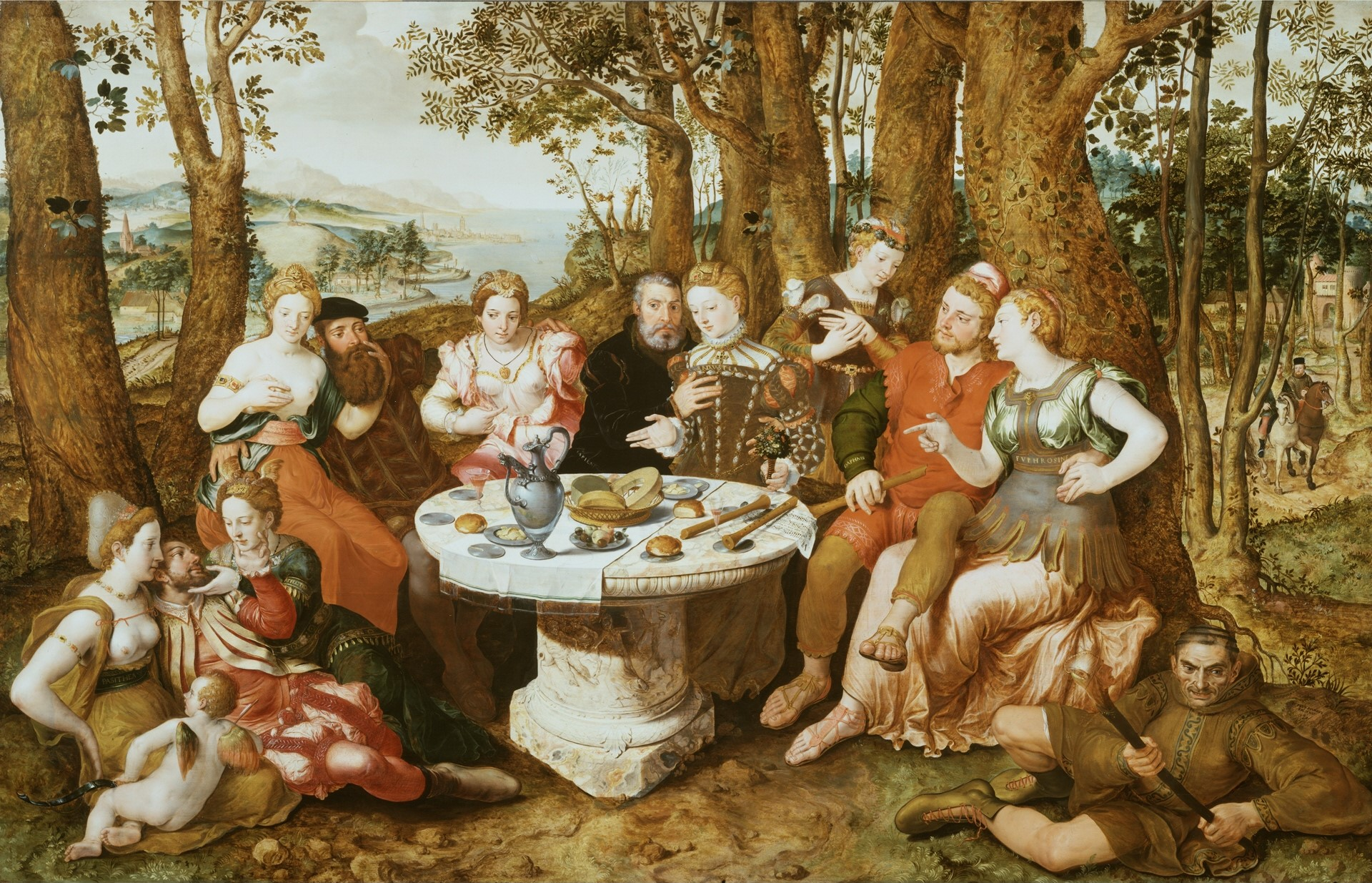
Allegory of True Love (1547)

Another work that dates back to Pourbus' early years in Bruges is his only remaining non-religious history work, An Allegory of True Love, currently part of the Wallace Collection in London. This work shows also how Pourbus style is truly innovative for his time.

His triptych The Baptism of Christ, which dates back to 1549 and now hangs in the Museo del Prado in Madrid, is one of the most famous examples of his early work.

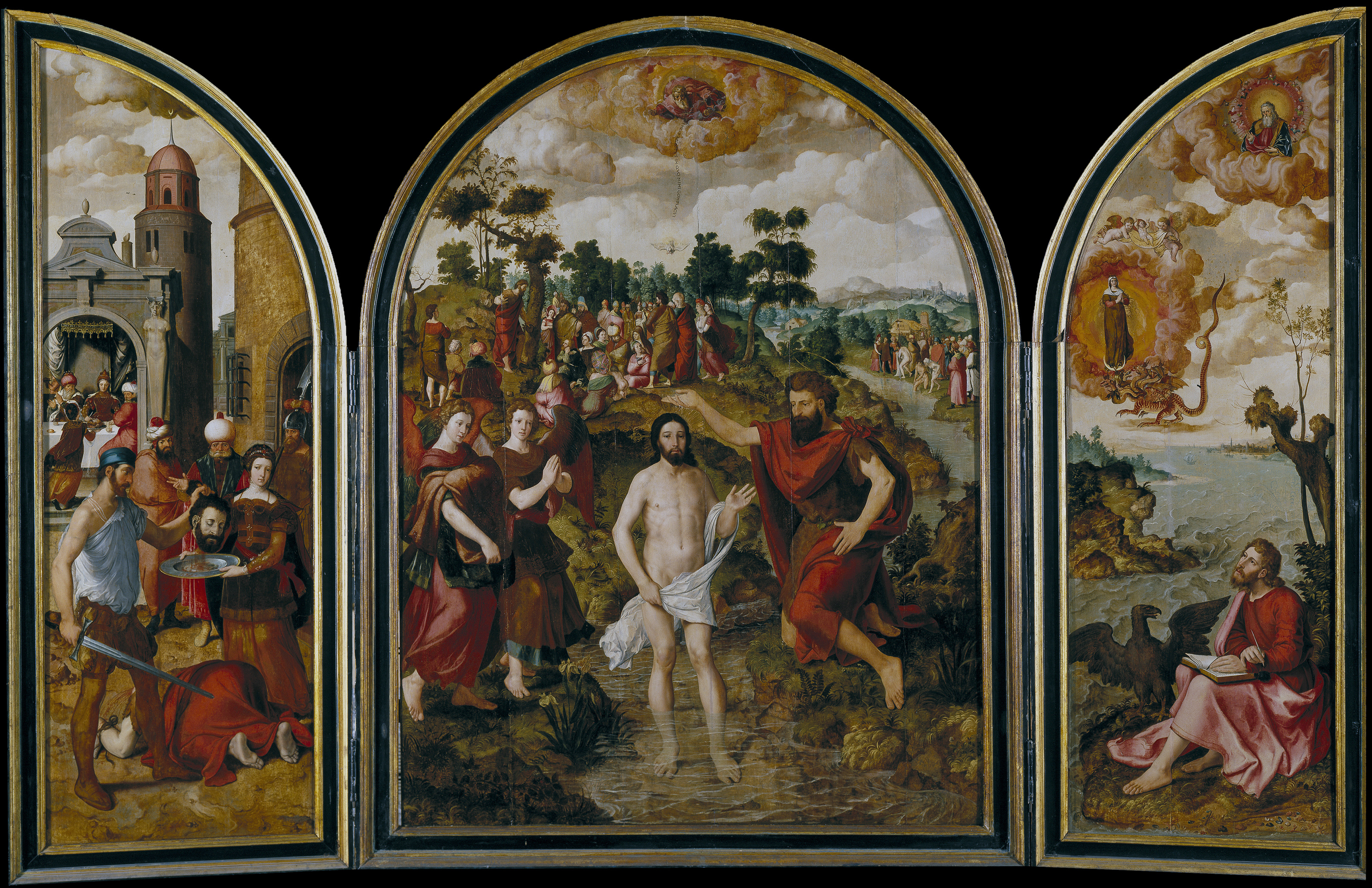
Triptych of Baptism of Christ, 1549, 241 × 377 cm, Prado Museum, Madrid

=== Independent work ===
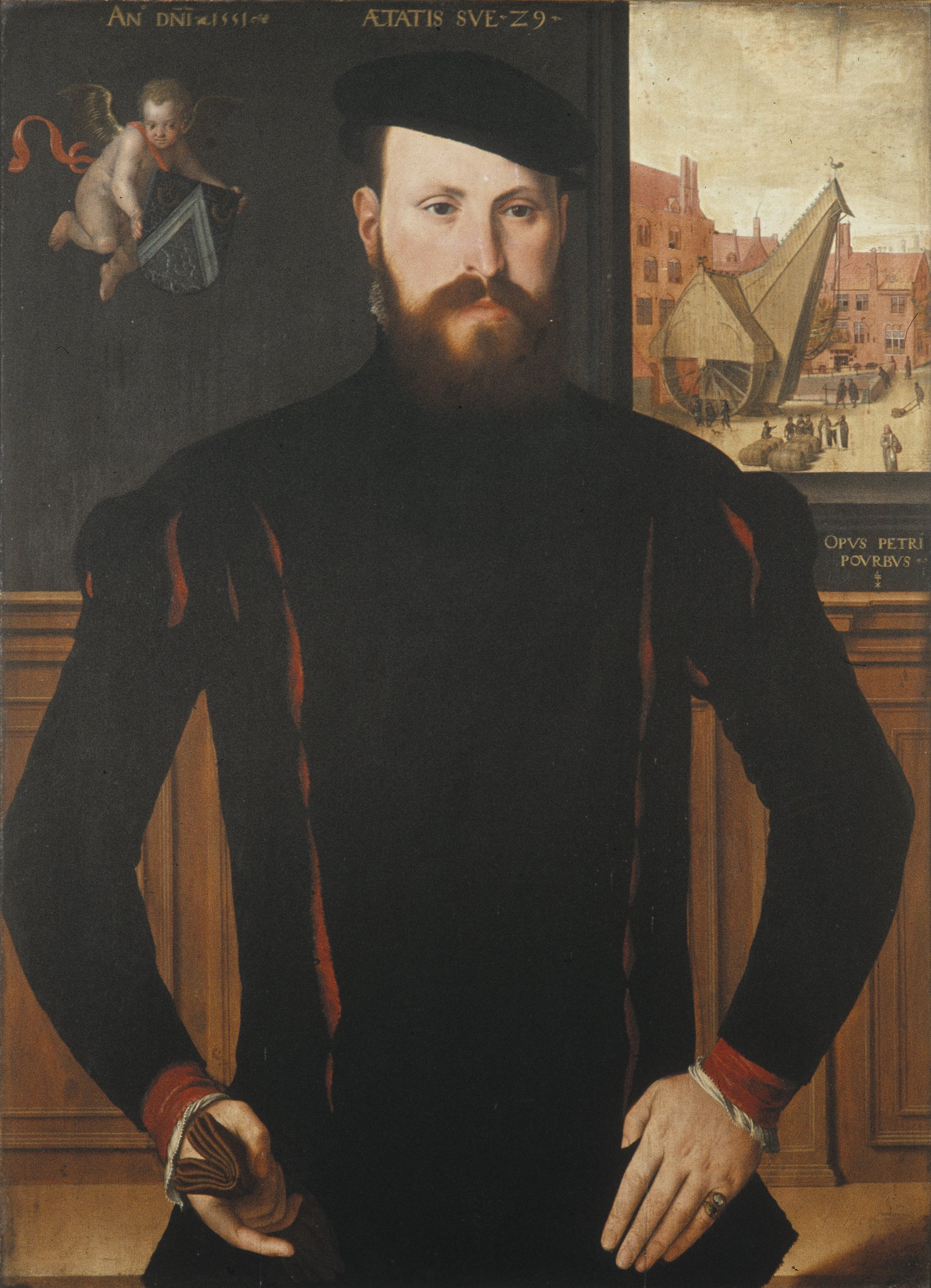
Portrait of Jan van Eyewerve (1551), 97.7 × 71.4 cm. Inscriptions: right, below the window: "OPVS PETRI/POVRBVS", below:Pourbus' mark, top left: "ANNO D(OMIN)I 1551", adjacent: "AETATIS SVE – 29"

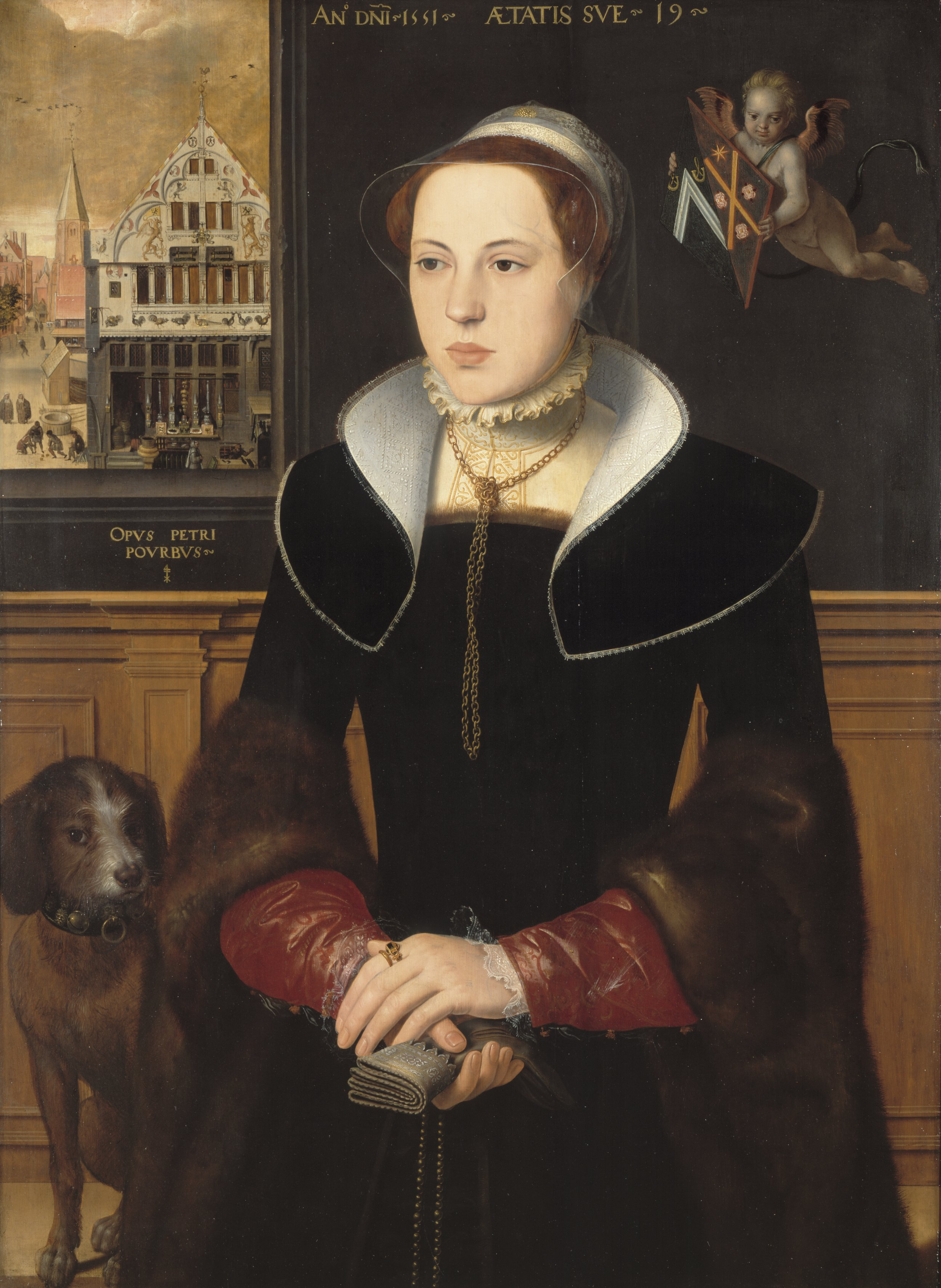
Portrait of Jacquemyne Buuck (1551), 97.5 × 71.2 cm. Inscriptions: left below the window: "OPVS PETRI/POVRBVS", below:Pourbus' mark, top center: "ANNO D(OMIN)I 1551", adjacent: "AETATIS SVE – 19"

In 1549, Pourbus' name started to appear in a number of historical documents; he was named yearly, and sometimes even daily, in many official sources. During this period he received many notable commissions from the Brugse Vrije, such as the decorations for the Joyous Entry of Charles V and Philip II in 1549 ('Blijde intocht van Karel V en prins Filips in 1549'), a drawing for a new banquet hall, and the Last Judgment (Laatste Oordeel). Another prominent commission was his works for the mausoleum of Margaret of Austria at the Annunciation Convent in Bruges, parts of a commission Blondeel received in 1550 comprising a sculpted mausoleum, stained glass windows and paintwork. Among the paint works, Pourbus painted the Annunciation currently displayed at Museum Gouda. He also realised the drawings for the stained glass windows.

Pourbus gradually became a popular portrait painter among the upper class, such as wine merchant Jan van Eyewerve and his wife Jacquemyne Buuck. In addition, Pourbus began to expressly date and sign his works in this period, indicative of the rise in his reputation and his growing artistic independence.

=== Active Guild member ===
Around 1551, Pourbus became a prominent and active member of the council of the local Guild of St. Luke. He served two terms as dean of the guild and five terms as sworn elder. As an elder, he participated in quality checks on fellow guild members; for instance, he visited Simon Puseel in response to the latter's poor performance in gilding the dome of the Jerusalem Chapel in Bruges. As a dean, he acted to prevent paintings from Dordrecht being sold inside the city walls. He also defended the guild's interests several times in the leasing of land it owned in the province of Zeeland. Pourbus was also a very active member of the Bruges Guild of Sculptors and Saddlers.

All these works paid off. In 1552, Pourbus bought the "Huis Rome" (the house called "Rome") on the Jan Miraelstraat, where he set up his own painting studio. Van Mander later wrote that Pourbus set up the best paint shop he had ever seen there.

=== An important cartographic activity ===
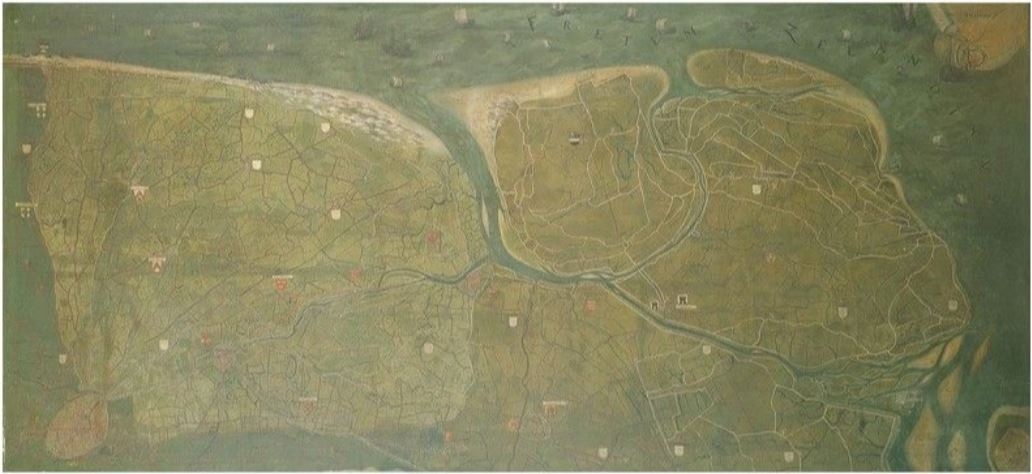
Map of the Brugse Vrije (1571), 151 × 322.5 cm

Pourbus produced many topographic maps during this period, which were intended to support surveyors' legal reports. He started to use a new methodology based on triangulation, according to the principles developed by his contemporary Gemma Frisius, which resulted in more accurate and very modern maps. It is not known exactly how Pourbus obtained this knowledge, but it is known that his father-in-law, Blondeel, was also a cartographer, and that his 1549 map of the canal between Damme and Sluis indicates that he was probably already using this new technique at that time, constituting a great innovative movement in the 1540s in Bruges.

By decision of 13 December 1561, the Liberty of Bruges granted him the order for the large map that Pourbus then produced for several years. The order is well documented in the archives of the city, throughout the years of its execution, and every year, where he regularly reported on his work. He received numerous advances of money, and still in 1567–1568. He finished this large work in 1571.

== Pourbus as an established artist ==
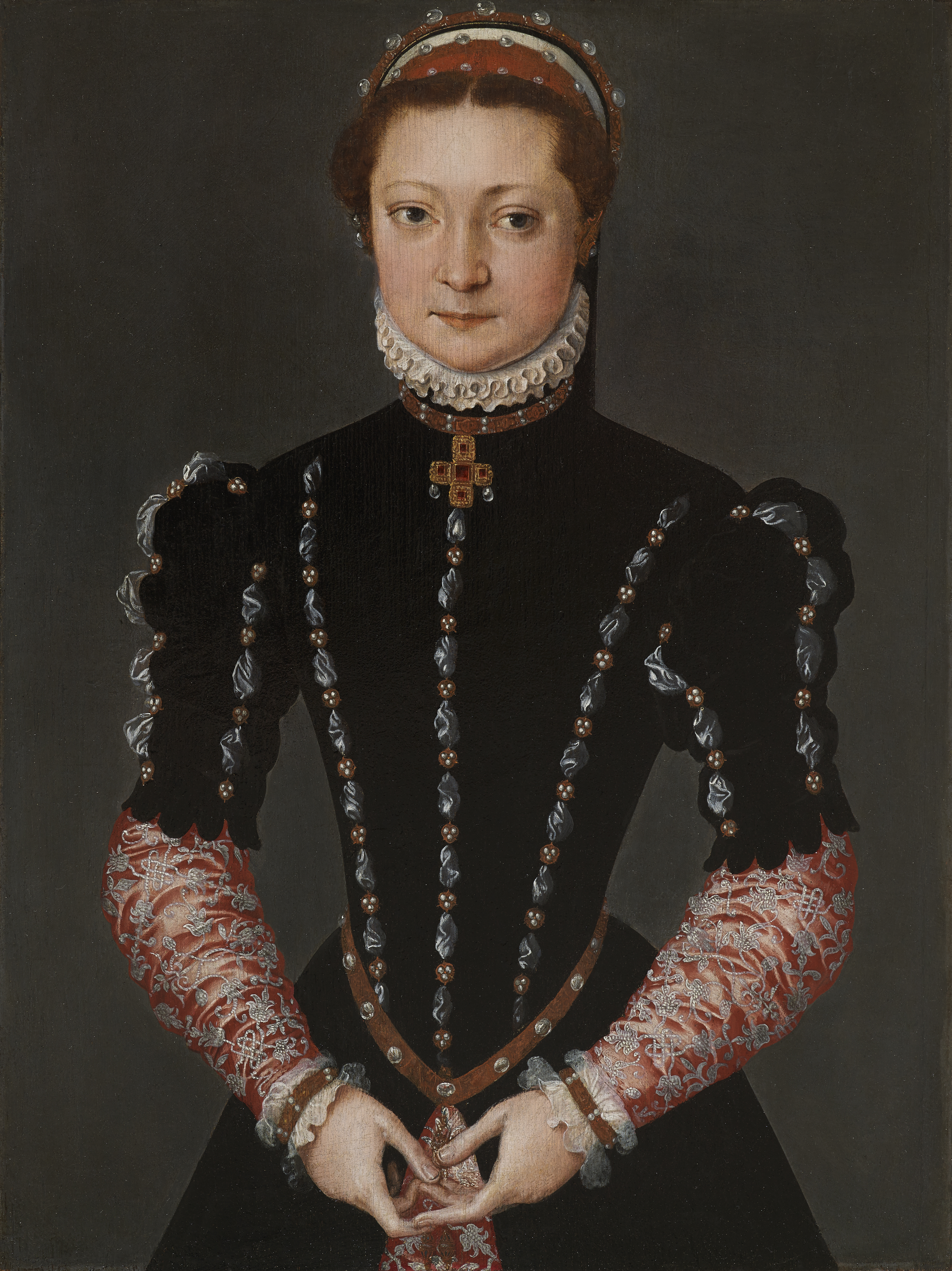
Portrait of a Noble Young Lady, 41.3 × 31.2 cm, Inscriptions, upper right: Pourbus monogram, and date: "1554", private collection, by Pieter Pourbus

=== Portrait of a Noble Young Lady and other portraits ===
During this period Pourbus became notable for his portraits of nobility and wealthy merchants. Pourbus' Portrait of a Noble Young Lady (1554) is considered by many art historians, such as Paul Huvenne, former Director of the Royal Museum of Fine Arts Antwerp, to be one of the best examples of his portraiture.

Her dress and its distinctive lace collar allowed Huvenne, who discovered this painting, to date the portrait as having been painted before 1560. An IR examination conducted before the exhibition in Bruges in 2017 revealed that the portrait was done by Pourbus in 1554.

Pourbus was also known for group portraits, such as the wing-panels with portraits of the Members of the Noble Confraternity of the Holy Blood and the Sacra Confrerie of St. Salvator's Cathedral. The position of the sitters in these portraits suggest that Pourbus was influenced by the work of Utrecht-based painter Jan van Scorel.

=== Religious paintings ===
Pourbus followed up on his Last Judgment and the Annunciation with the smaller Crucifixion in 1557.

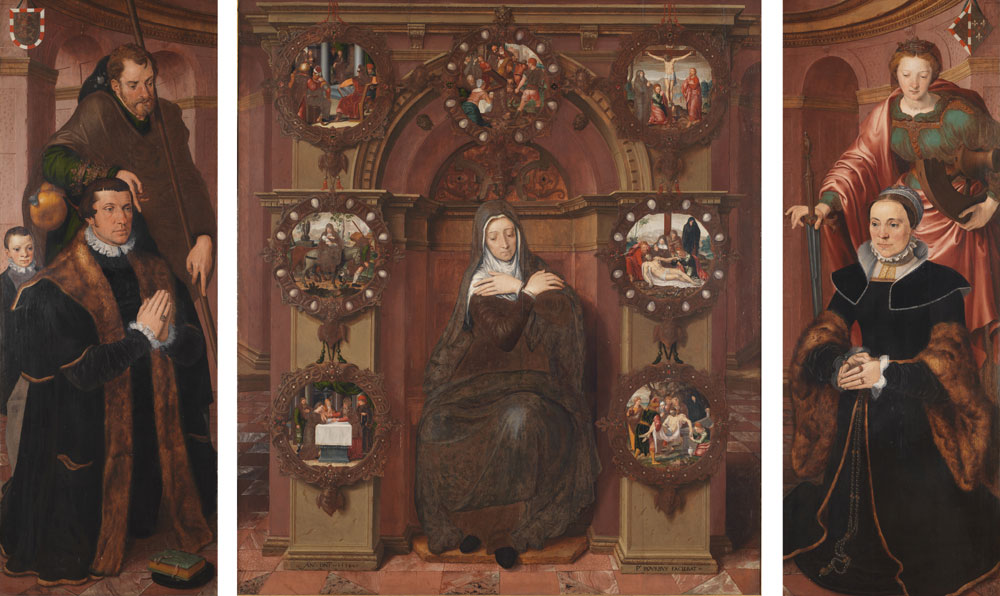
Tritych of the Virgin of Sorrows also called Van Belle Triptych (1556), 139.8 × 123.3 cm(center panel), 140.3 × 52 cm(left-wing panel), 139.6 × 52 cm(right-wing panel), Inscriptions: center panel, on the base of the left pilaster: "ANNO D(OMINI) – 1556, center panel on the base of the right pilaster: "PE POVRBVS FACIEBAT", on the frame of the left-wing panel: "AETATIS SVE – 45", on the frame of the right-wing panel: "AETATIS SVE – 44",

However, the Van Belle triptych (1556) is one of the most famous of his religious works and is often considered by art historians to be an important milestone in his career. An original design drawing of the painting contains handwritten comments, in which the artist agrees to portray the Madonna not with clenched hands but in a more resigned posture: with the arms pressed crosswise over one another. The theme of Our Lady of the Seven Sorrows was a popular subject of paintings in the Renaissance, and the unusual posture was perhaps an attempt to distinguish the painting from the many other depictions of the Virgin Mary at the time. The Van Belle triptych was partially influenced by the statue of the Madonna with Child by Michelangelo at the Church of Our Lady in Bruges.

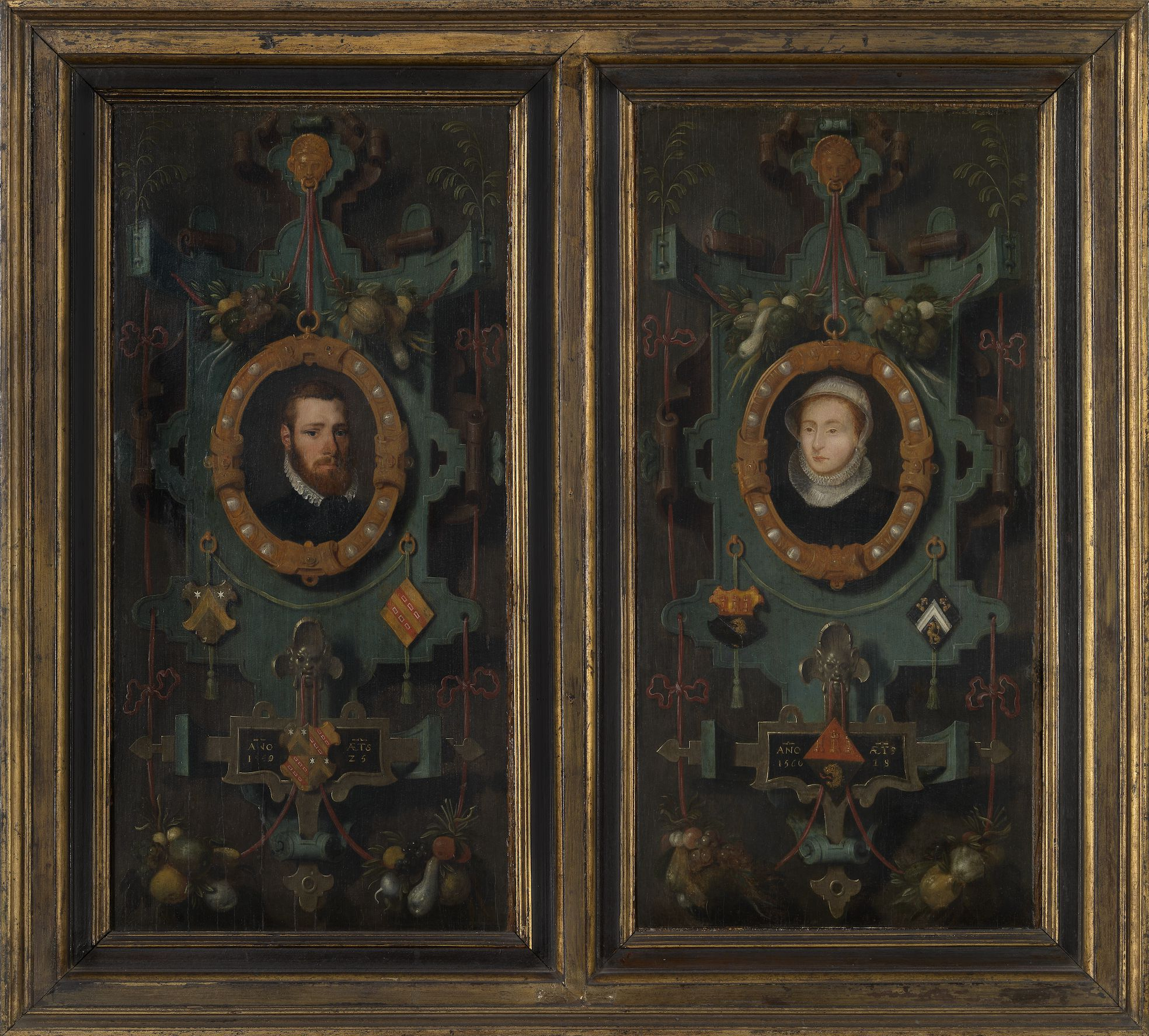
Portraits of Christoffel Ghuyse and Elisabeth Van Male, 1560, 51 × 51.3 cm, Groeningemuseum Brugge

Pourbus' 1558 Pietà at the Église Saint-Maurice in Annecy and his Adoration of the Golden Calf, painted around 1559, are also examples of his many religious works.

Pourbus and his painting style soon became the leading representative of the Italian High Renaissance as propagated in Antwerp by Frans Floris. One example of this style is the grotesques in which he depicted the portraits of Ghuyse-Van Male and his wife. At this point, Pourbus' work featured more translucent brushwork and a clear composition style. These aspects are evident in the Van Belle triptych, in which he paraphrases the composition of Jan van Eyck's The Virgin and Child with Canon Van der Paele from 1434. Pourbus began to gain a reputation in Bruges for his artwork and innovation; the Italian Ludovico Guicciardini names him as one of the most important painters of his time in his Descrittione di tutti i Paesi Bassi or Description of all the Low Countries in 1567.

=== Influence and fame ===
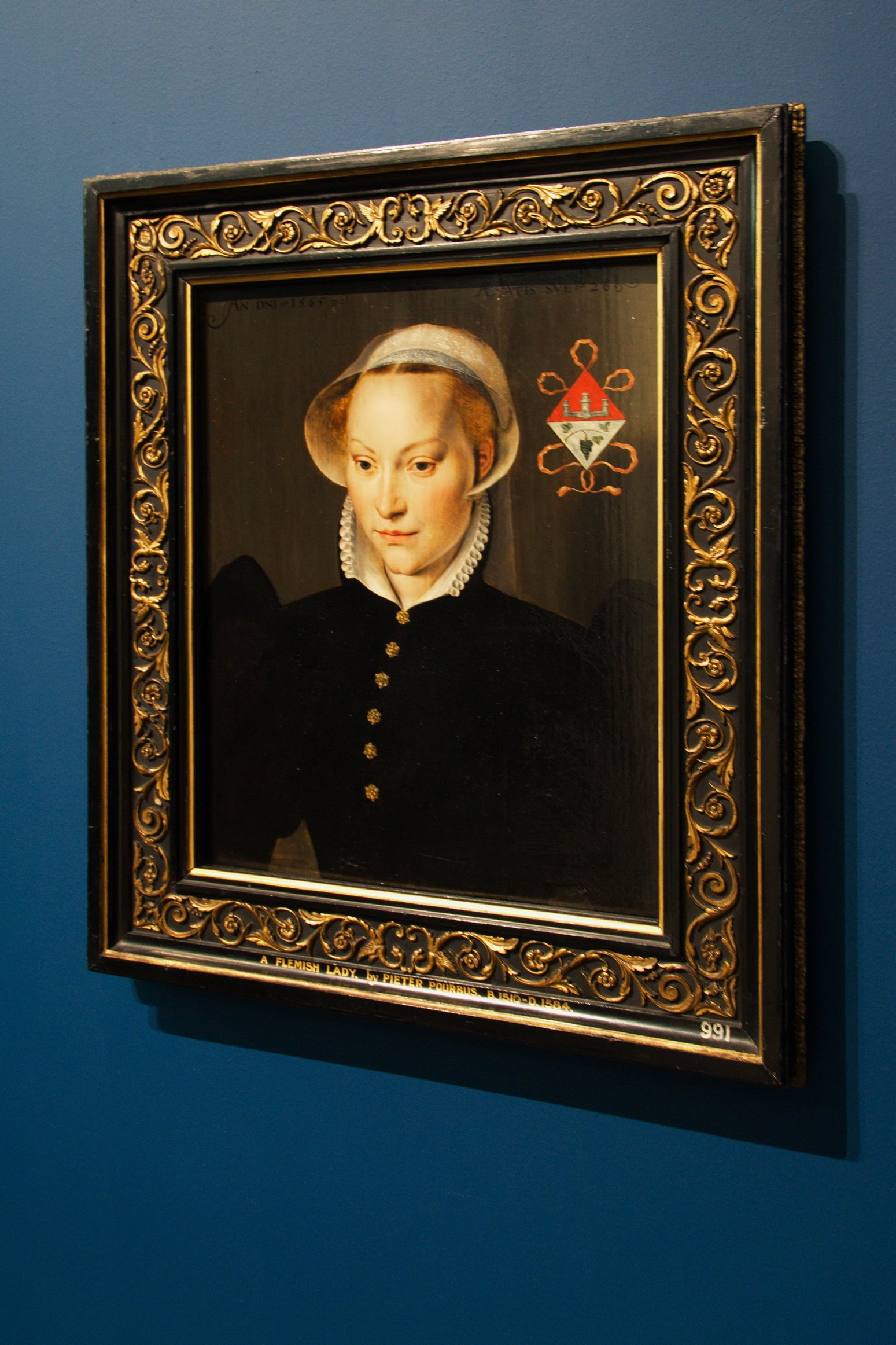
Portrait of a Woman with Unknown Coat of Arms, 1565, National Galleries of Scotland, Edinburgh

Blondeel died in 1561, and Pourbus soon surpassed him in fame. In the years that followed, he taught many apprentices, including his son and Antonius Claeissens.

One of his most well-known paintings from this period is his Portrait of a Woman with Unknown Coat of Arms (1565). In spite of the coat of arms, the subject of the painting has not yet been identified. It has been suggested that she might be part of the De Grave family, who were originally from Flanders but settled in Andalusia. The painting was often taken to be a portrait of Mary, Queen of Scots for much of the nineteenth century. Scholars have noted the painting's smooth, enamel-like stylisation, and the woman's introverted and enigmatic quality. This is reminiscent of Guicciardini's assertions that in Bruges, "Women are as beautiful, charming, modest and temperate as in any town in these lands".

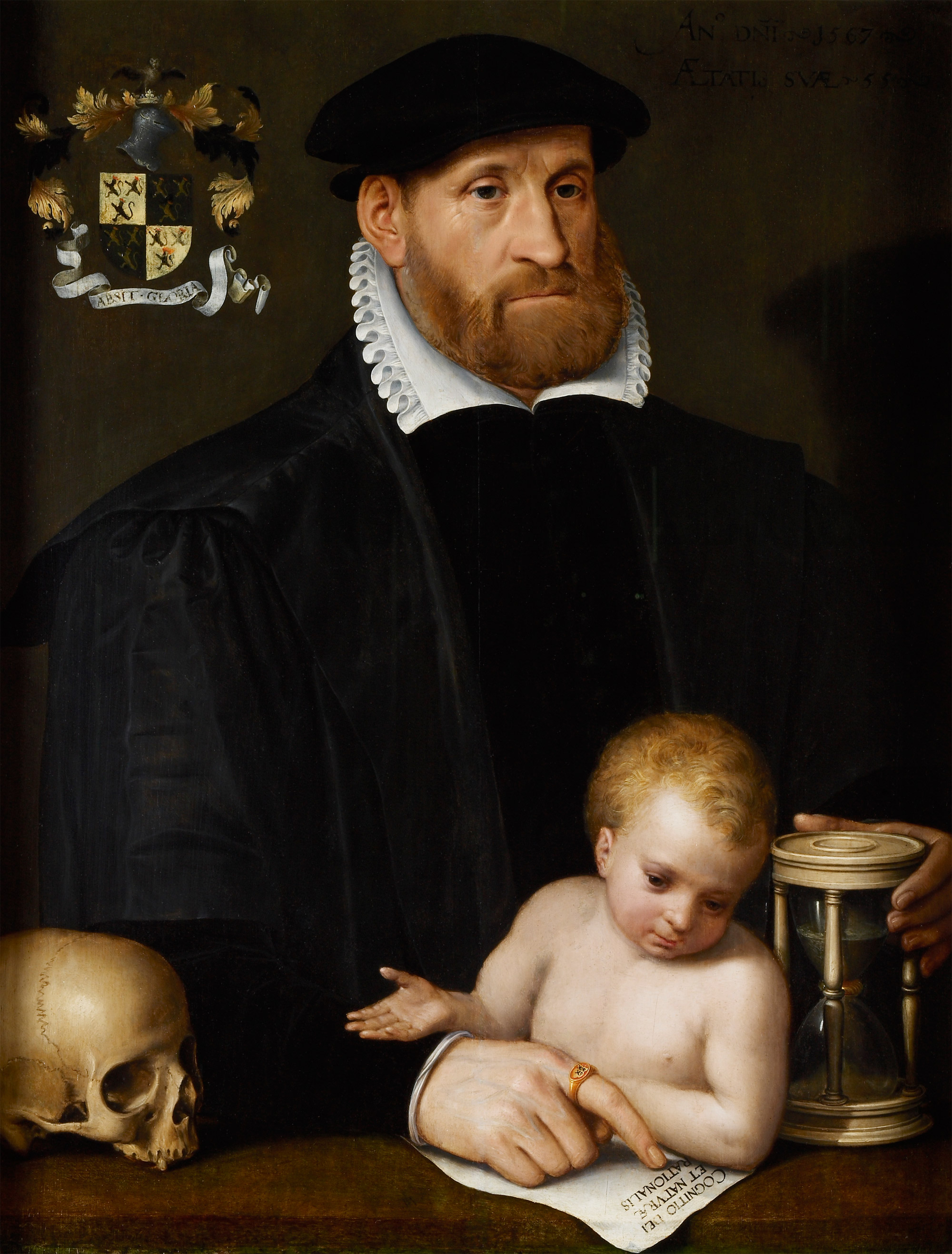
Portrait of Francois Van der Straten, 68 × 63.5 cm, Inscriptions: top right: "AN(N)O D(OMIN)I – 1567 – AETATIS SVE – 55", on the ring: "1567", below the coat of arms: "ABSIT GLORIA", on the sheet of paper: "COGNITIO DEI/ ET NATVRAE/RATIONALIS", Museum Mayer van den Bergh, Antwerp, Belgium

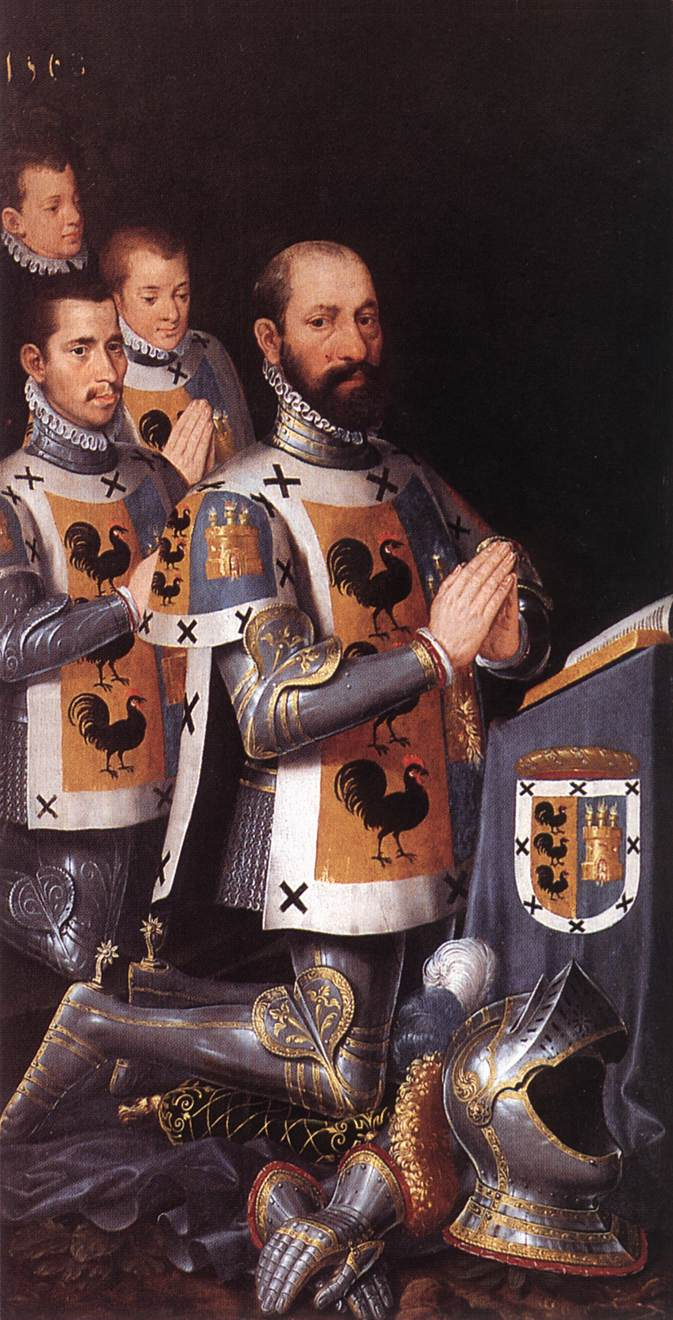
Portrait of Jan Lopez Gallo and His Three Sons, 1568, 97.5 × 52 cm, Groeningemuseum, Bruges

In 1567, Pourbus produced a portrait of Knight François van der Straten, a leading authority in the Liberty of Bruges and an academically trained lawyer. He drew inspiration from an allegorical print by Cornelis Theunisz from 1537 in which a child, an hourglass, and a skull reflect the theme of the transience of life in a similar matter to the portrait.

The motto on his coat of arms, "Absit gloria" ("Reject glory"), also reflects the notion of vanitas. The text that he points out on the note beneath his hand reads "Cognitio Dei et natvrae rationalis", which can be translated as "Knowledge of God and reasonable nature". Both inscriptions are a reflection of the Renaissance humanist values of rationality, religion, and the worth of education, values that were then becoming dominant among the Northern European upper classes.

In the same year, he also painted the portrait of Pieter de Corte, the newly appointed bishop of the recently created bishopric of Bruges. De Corte was appointed by King Philip II of Spain; the prestige of such a commission indicates the high status that Pourbus had accrued by this time.

His Portrait of Juan Lopez Gallo and His Three Sons (1568) reflects both Pourbus' artistic style and the strength of his ties to the Spanish upper class. There, Pourbus dealt with his clients' differing customs by adjusting the size of his retables to suit the size of altar that was customary in Spain at the time. Sometimes, he left the actual execution of paintings for his more distant clients to atelier staff, as shown in his Mount at Calvary in the Cathedral of San Pedro of Soria.

== Later years and death ==
=== The 1570s ===
After the enormous effort of the Great Map, Pourbus once again was able to take on regular commissions. During this time, his students began to leave his studio and become independent painters; Pourbus' son Frans left for Antwerp in 1569 to make his fortune as a painter there, and Antonius Claeissens became the official city painter of Bruges in 1570. In addition, his style changed slightly during this period. His brushwork in these works and others of this period became less transparent and more enamel-like. This is seen in his portrait of Olivier Van Nieulant, which is now in the Royal Museum of Fine Arts Antwerp. His change in style has been noted by scholars to lend a cooler appearance and a more classicist quality to his work, but also makes his subjects more rigid in appearance.

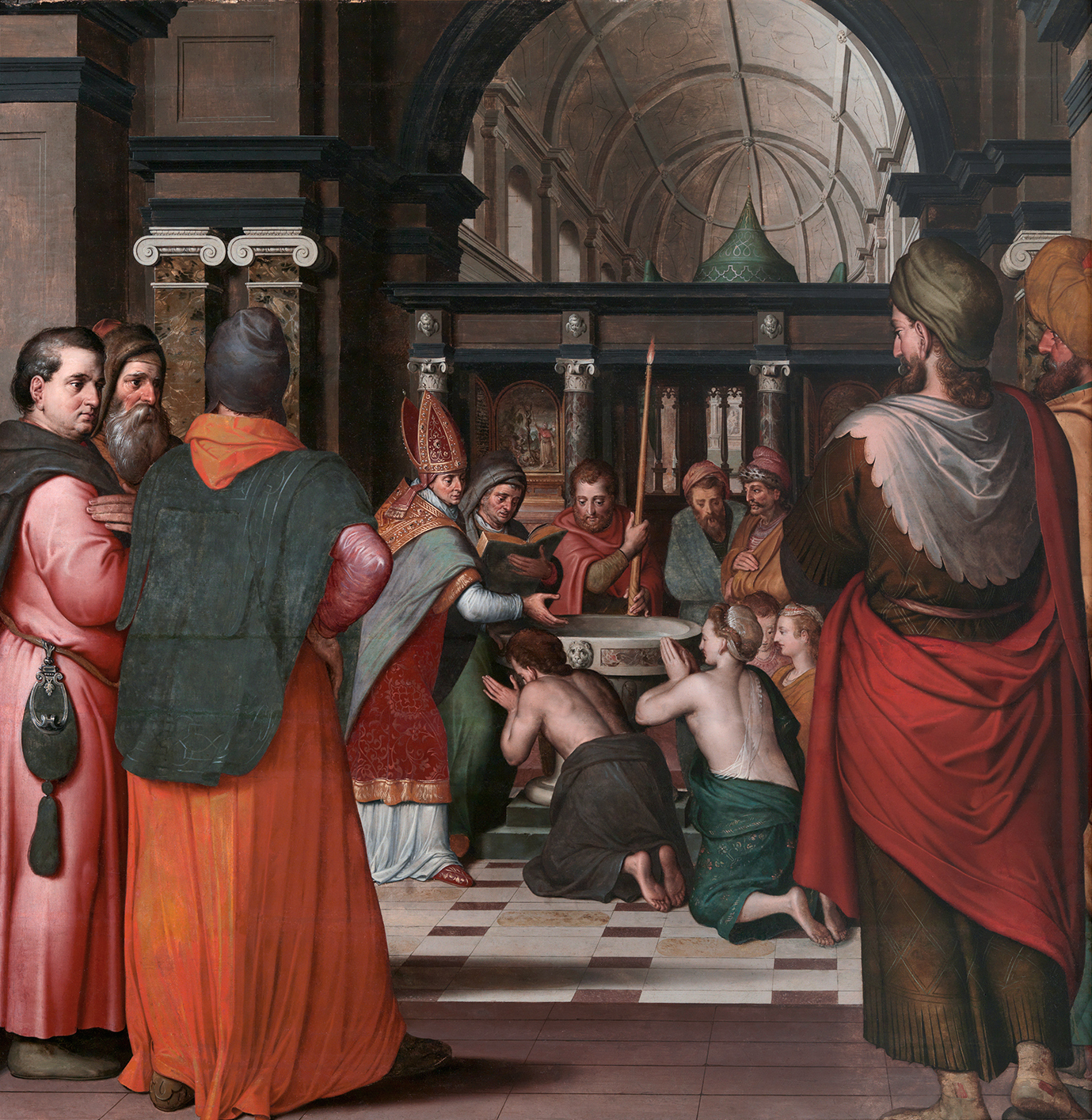
The Baptism of Saint Hubertus, (before 1572), 131.5 × 129.6 cm, Museum Gouda, The Netherlands.

This shift is also apparent in his history paintings, such as the Altarpiece of St. Hubert, painted before 1572. Pourbus was greatly influenced by the artistic tradition of the Italian Renaissance, of which the Altarpiece is a prime example. It is remarkable how well Pourbus is able to focus his compositions or inventions on the Italian Renaissance idiom, given that he has never been to Italy.

This painting, part of an altarpiece whose other shutters are lost, is also sometimes called "Baptism of Saint Eustace". The legends of these two saints, Saint Hubert (or Hubert de Liège) and Saint Eustache (or Eustache de Rome) are indeed very close. A very detailed study on this painting and the questions it poses was published during the Gouda exhibition in 2018 by Josephina de Fouw.
This altarpiece was praised as the best work of Pourbus by van Mander, who speaks of it as "a beautiful temple, with the perspective very well done".

Usually, Pourbus drew his inspiration from artists of the Renaissance, such as Dürer, Raphael, and Titian. For example, he drew strongly on Titian for the middle panel of the Damhouder Triptych at the Church of Our Lady in Bruges.

As a well-established painter, Pourbus was occasionally seen as too expensive during this period. For example, in autumn of 1571, he created a design for an altarpiece for the Church of Our Lady in Damme, but a different, cheaper painter, Jacob van den Coornhuuse, was commissioned to do the work instead.

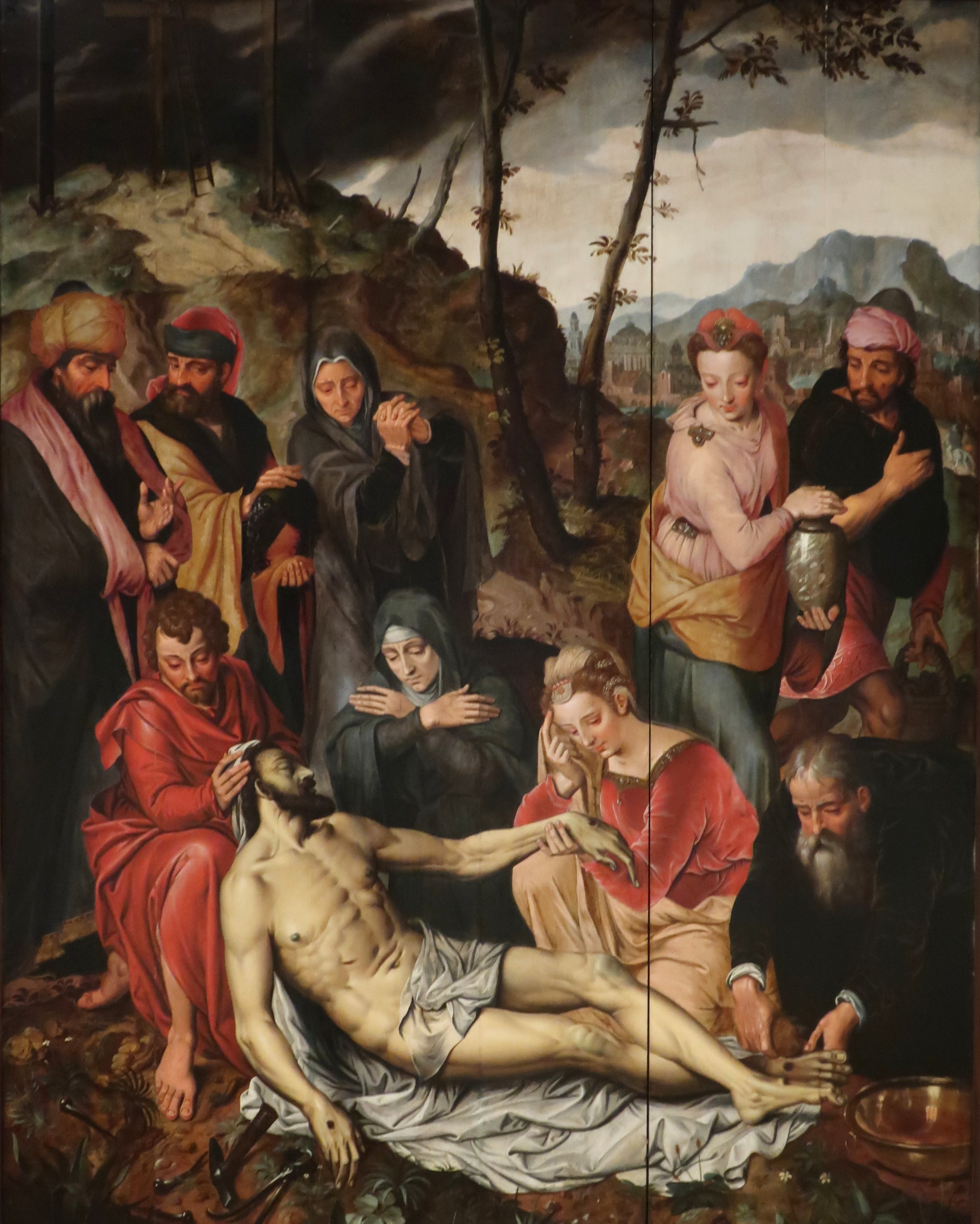
The Lamentation of Christ, 215 × 166 cm, (n.d.), Schorr Collection, on long-term loan to the Tel Aviv Museum of Art, Tel Aviv

Pourbus' studio continued to operate throughout the 1570s. Among others, he worked in close collaboration with Antonius Claeissens, who was influenced by Pourbus' style more than anyone else in Bruges in the early years of his career. The spectacular piece Lamentation, one of the highlights of the exhibition at Museum Gouda in 2018, was the result of an intensive collaboration between the two.

=== Eighty Years' War and aftermath ===
In 1578, a Protestant military force took over Bruges.(For more information on the expansion of Protestants at the time, read on the Dutch Revolt and the Pacification of Ghent) There was little resistance to the invasion, and the city became a Calvinist republic.

Once the threat of war increased after the Pacification of Ghent failed, the city's magistrate repeatedly asked Pourbus for his advice on building the city's defenses. His knowledge of water management, for instance, could have been of use in flooding certain areas as a defensive manoeuvre.

Even after the change in power that followed the city's capture in 1578, Pourbus continued to serve the now Protestant city authorities and enjoyed the confidence of the new government. For example, he was appointed head of his district in Sint-Nicolaas-Zestendeel in December 1580. This may indicate that he converted to Calvinism, like his son. His switch from Catholicism to Calvinism would mean that Pourbus became more intimately entwined with the Protestant upper class; he had already painted the portraits of various prominent Protestants in previous years, such as the wartime mayor Jan Wyts and Calvinist leaders such as Pieter Dominicle.

His epitaph for the Catholic Zeghere van Male, a rich merchant also known for a famous song book, probably dates back to 1578, before the invasion of Protestants from Ghent.

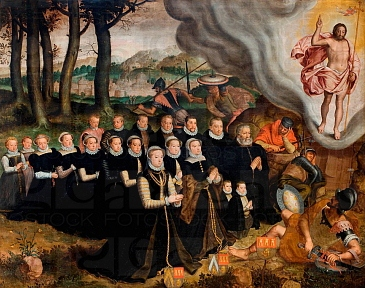
Epitaph of Zeger van Male, 120.5 × 154, Inscriptions: Bottom right, on a stone: "1578" followed by Pourbus' mark, on the original frame: "HIER VOORE(N) LIGHT BEGRAVE(N) DHEER ZEGHERE VA(N) MALE DIE OVERLEET DE(N) 7(DE) IULLET 1601 – ENDE IONCKUR(AUWE) ANTHONINE VANDE MAZE DHEER ZEGHERS 1-(ST)E HUUSVR(AUWE) WAS DIE OVERLEET DEN 9(D)E DESEMBRE 1559 – IONCKVRA(UWE) JOAN(NA) HAGHE SVOORST ZEGHERS – 2(D)E HUUSVR(AUWE) – OVERLEET DE(N) 17(DE AUOGST 1569 – DIE LIGHT GEBRAvE(N) TONSER VRAUWE(N) – IN – SACRAMENTS – CAPELLE", Church of St James, Bruges

During this period, Pourbus was mainly active as a water management expert and engineer; his artistic output decreased as a result.

In 1580, he painted a plan of the Abbey of the Dunes that was intended to serve as a guide for the reconstruction of the monastic complex after the war. This indicates that he had enough credibility within the suppressed Catholic community left to be granted this commission. In contrast, he also created the designs for the deconsecrated Church of St. Christopher in autumn of that same year to be turned into a market hall, because it was no longer permitted to be used for worship.

Pieter Pourbus died in January 1584. He may have been one of the many victims of the plague that struck Bruges at the time. His widow, Anna Blondeel, was allocated a pension by both the city's magistrate and the Liberty of Bruges. His portrait was hung in the guildhall as a memento to him. This portrait is however lost.

== Legacy ==
Pourbus was the leading figure of his generation in Bruges, often pioneering techniques. Stylistically speaking, he is part of the generation of Frans Floris. This generation of painters realized the breakthrough of the Italian Renaissance in the Low Countries. For example, Pourbus' Joyous Entry of Charles V and Prince Philip II, which dates from 1549, is a prime description of Renaissance architecture in Northern Europe.

In addition, Pourbus developed a recognizable hand that was influenced by classicism and its characteristic use of restraint and clear lines. Pourbus' works are often considered by scholars to be the last examples of the traditional Bruges school of painting.

He tutored both his son and grandson, Frans the Elder and Frans the Younger, who then became respected artists in their own right and contributed greatly to the beginning era of the Golden Age.

Pourbus managed to make a name for himself during his lifetime as one of the most important painters of his generation, both in Bruges and elsewhere; for example, Italian contemporaries such as historian Ludovico Guicciardini and artist biographer Giorgio Vasari make favourable mentions of him. Ludovico Guicciardini names him as one of the most important painters of his time in his Decrittione di tutti i Paesi Bassi or Description of all the Low Countries in 1567.

There are no portraits of Pieter Pourbus, but, according to Paul Huvenne, he may have included a self-portrait on the left altar wing of the "Tryptych of the Holy Sacrament fraternity" in the St Saviour's Cathedral, Bruges.

In 2025, a painting held at the Musée de la Chartreuse de Douai named Portrait of a Gentleman, His Daughter and a Servant, originally attributed to Pourbus, was reattributed to Italian artist Lavinia Fontana.

== Works ==
=== Paintings ===
Paintings by Pieter Pourbus can be seen mainly at the Groeningemuseum of Bruges, the Museum Gouda in Gouda, the Rijksmuseum in Amsterdam, the Sint Janskerk in Bruges, and the Church of Our Lady, Bruges. Other than the above-mentioned paintings, his corpus includes with certainty the following works:

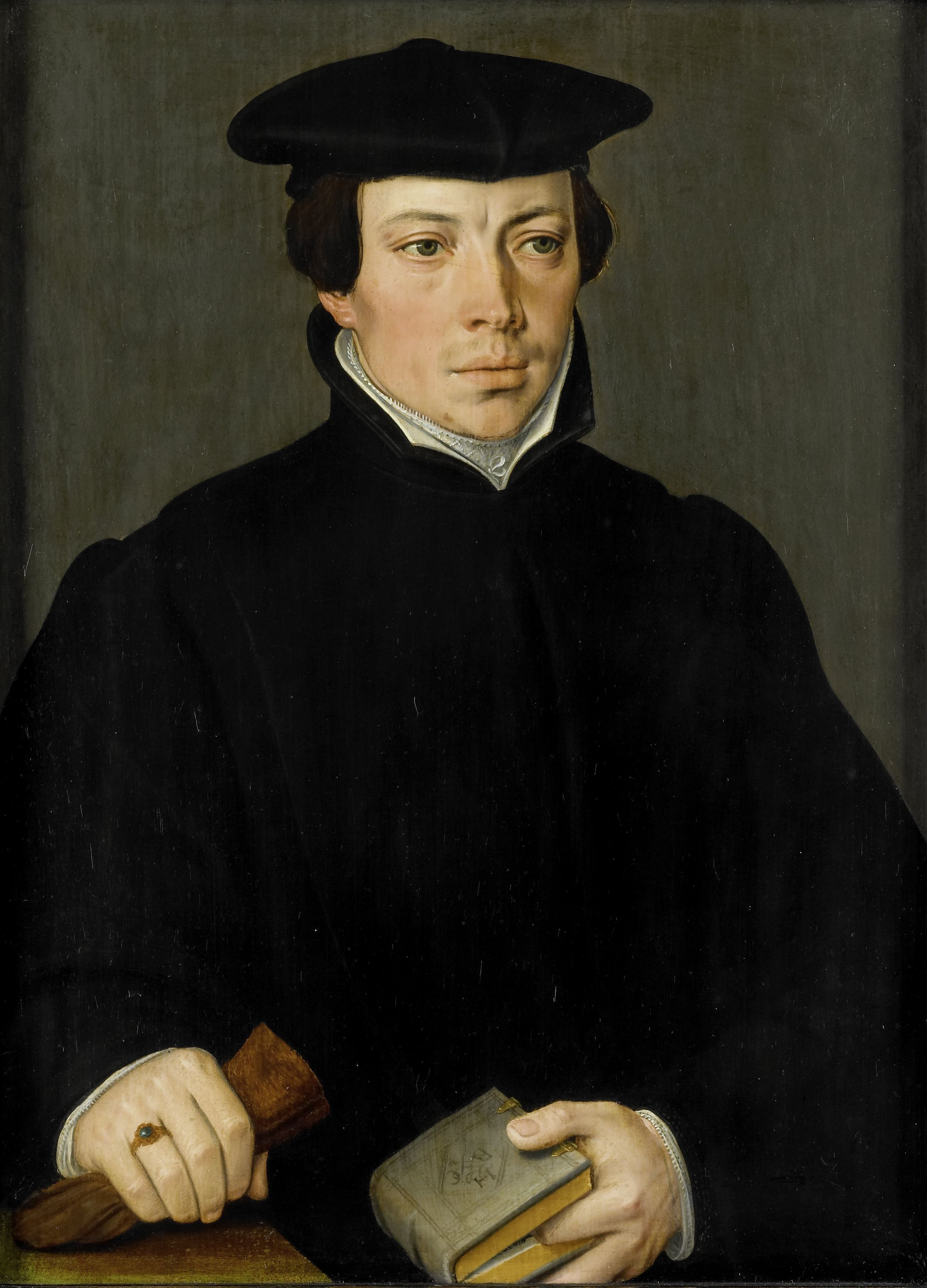
Portrait of a young minister, c. 1535–80, 42.5 cm × 31 cm, Rijksmuseum, Amsterdam, the Netherlands

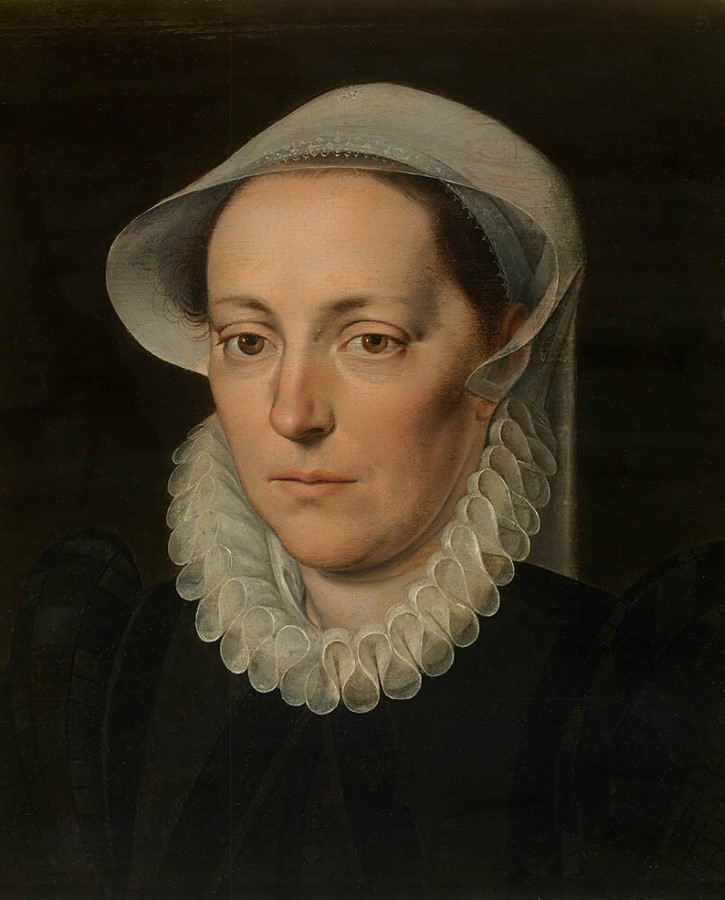
Portrait of a Woman, c. 1535–84, 34 cm × 27.5 cm, Inscriptions top left: "A.DNI.1548; middle above: OBIIT A 60; top right: AETATIS MEAE 56", Royal Museum of Fine Arts Antwerp (KMSKA), Belgium

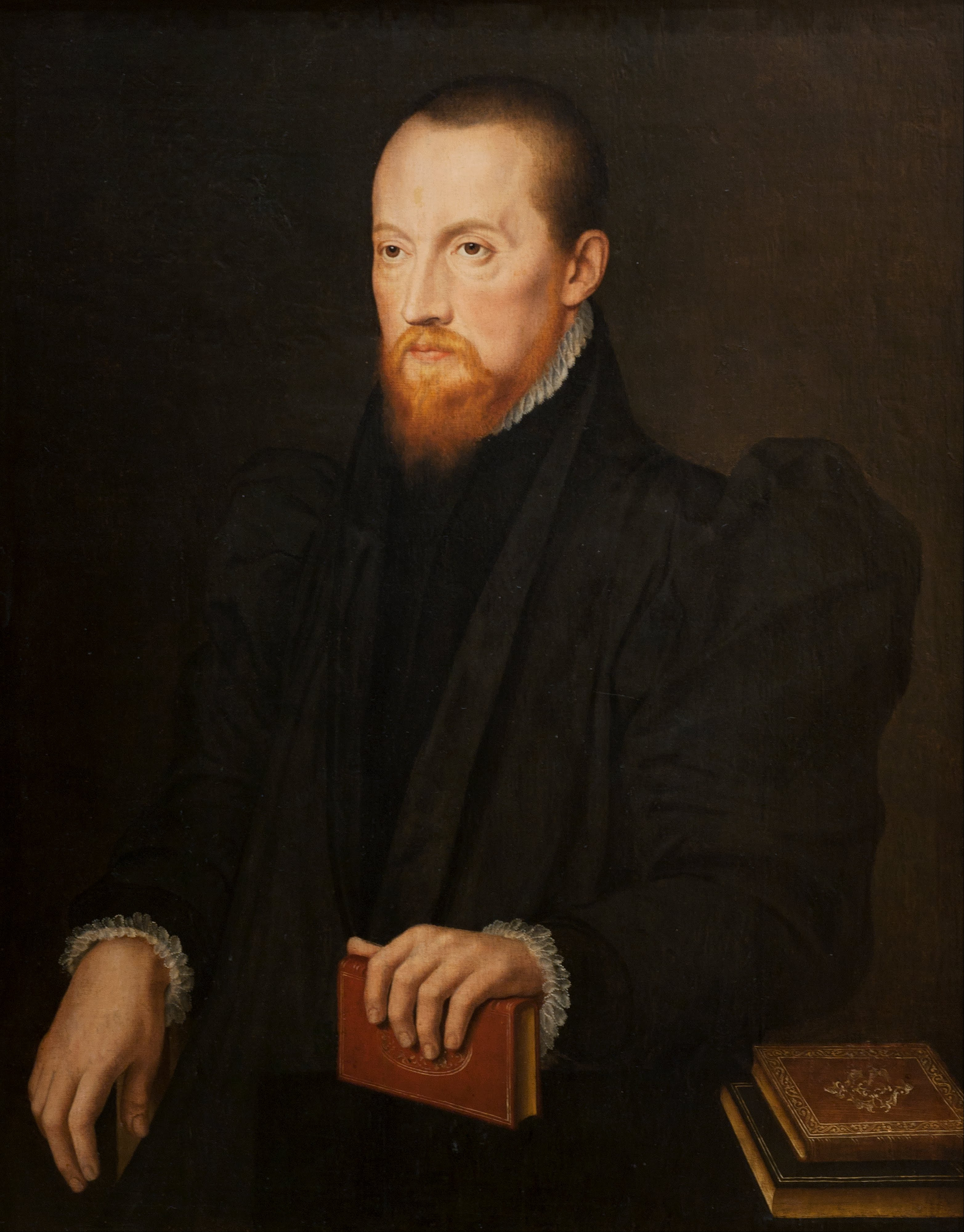
Bearded, red-headed man, seated 1555, 84 × 65 cm, Santander Bank Foundation, Madrid, Spain

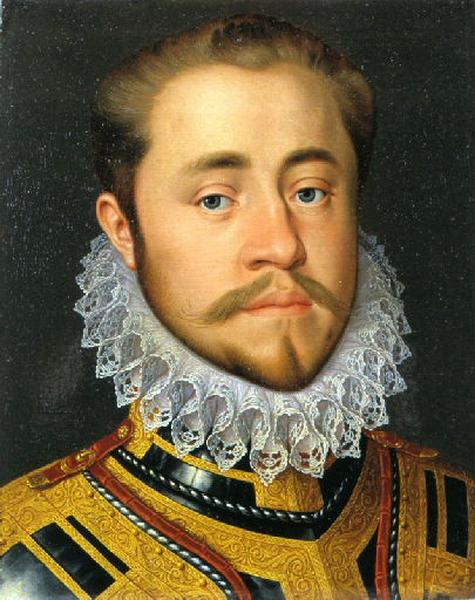
Portrait of a gentleman in armour, c. 1570–80, 35 cm × 27.2 cm, Musée de Picardie, France

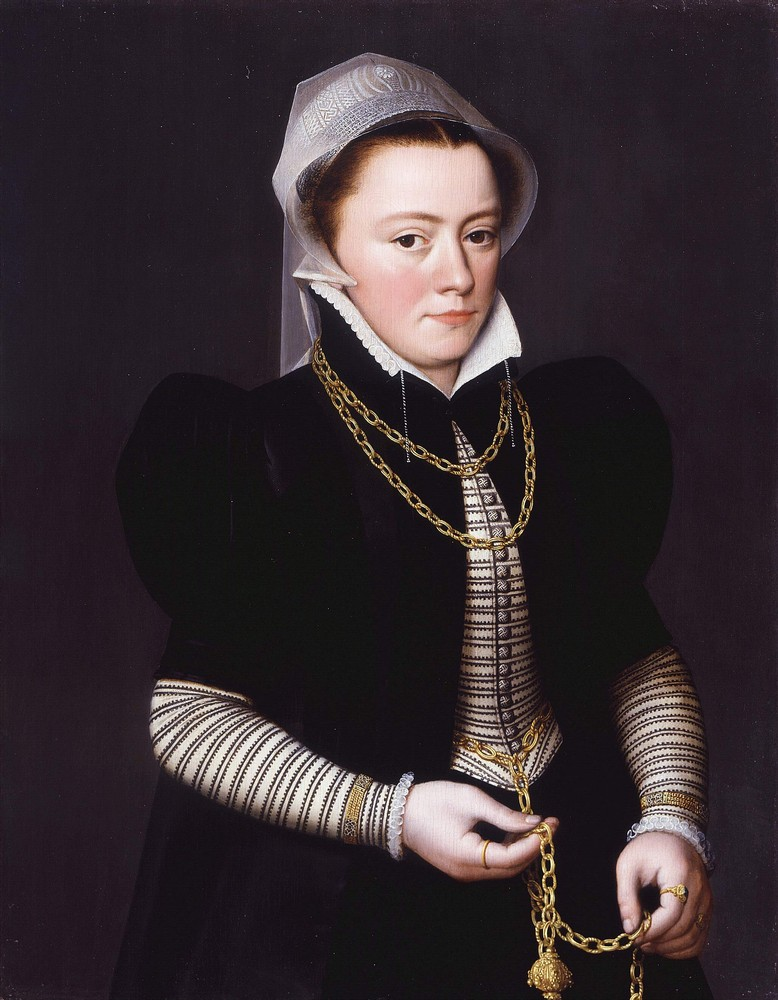
Portrait of an Unknown Lady, holding a pomander on a Gold Chain, 1560

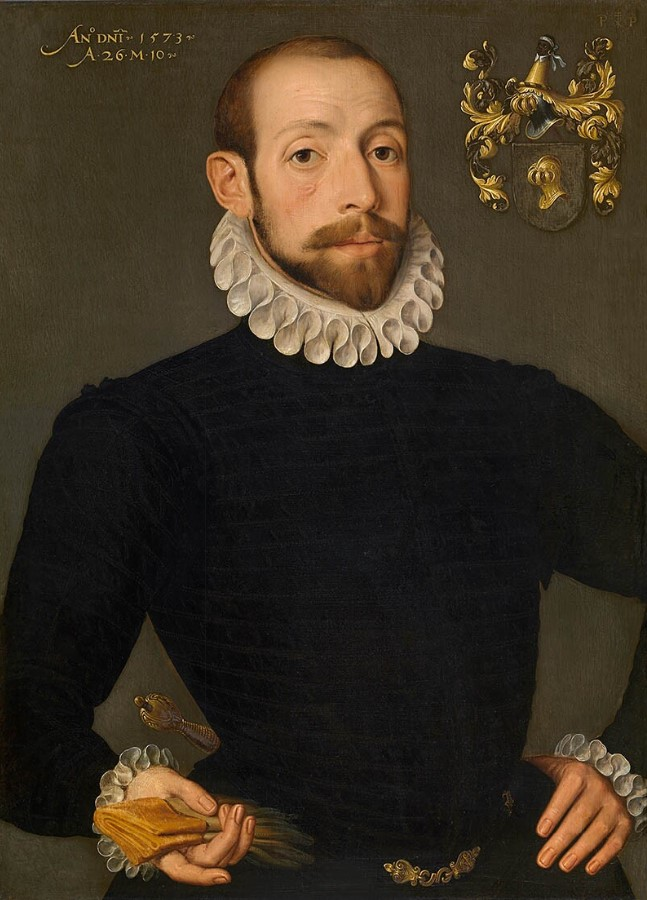
Portrait of Olivier van Nieulant, 1573, 49.5 × 37.5 cm - Royal Museum of Fine Arts Antwerp, Antwerp, Belgium

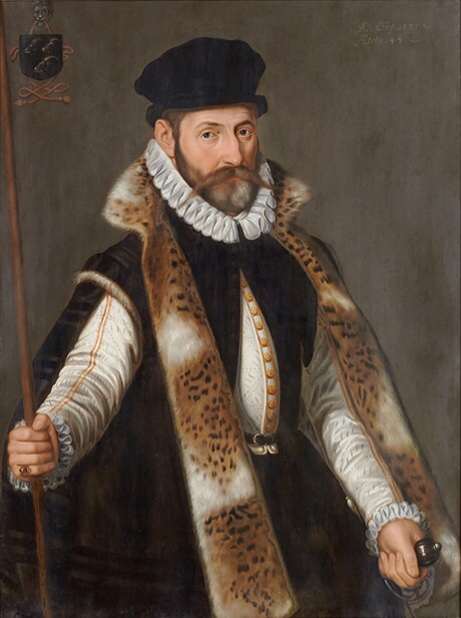
Portrait of Christian van der Goes, 1574, 91 cm × 67.5 cm, top right inscript. : "A: Dm 1575 - Aetatis 44"

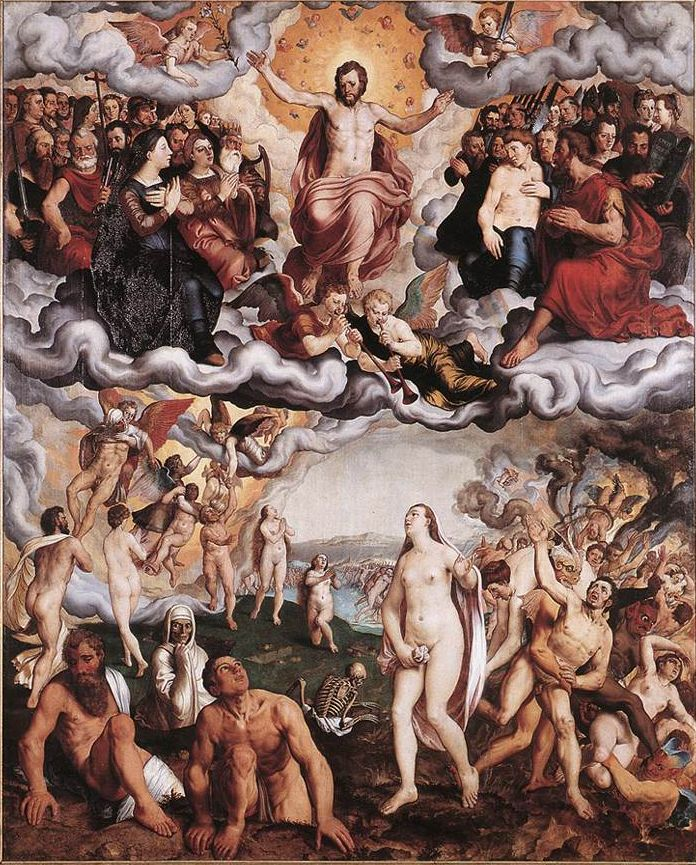
Last Judgement, 1551, 229 cm × 180.5 cm, Groeningemuseum, Brugge, Belgium

=== Attributed paintings ===
- "Portrait of a Woman in a White Bonnet", c.1545/1555, 18 × 18 cm, – Gift (with the house and grounds) from Anthony de Rothschild to the National Trust, 1949. National Trust, Ascot, United Kingdom.
- "Mary Magdalene", oil on oak panel, attr. to P. Pourbus, 46 × 30.50 cm, Artcurial auction, Paris June 16, 2020, sold for €517.400.
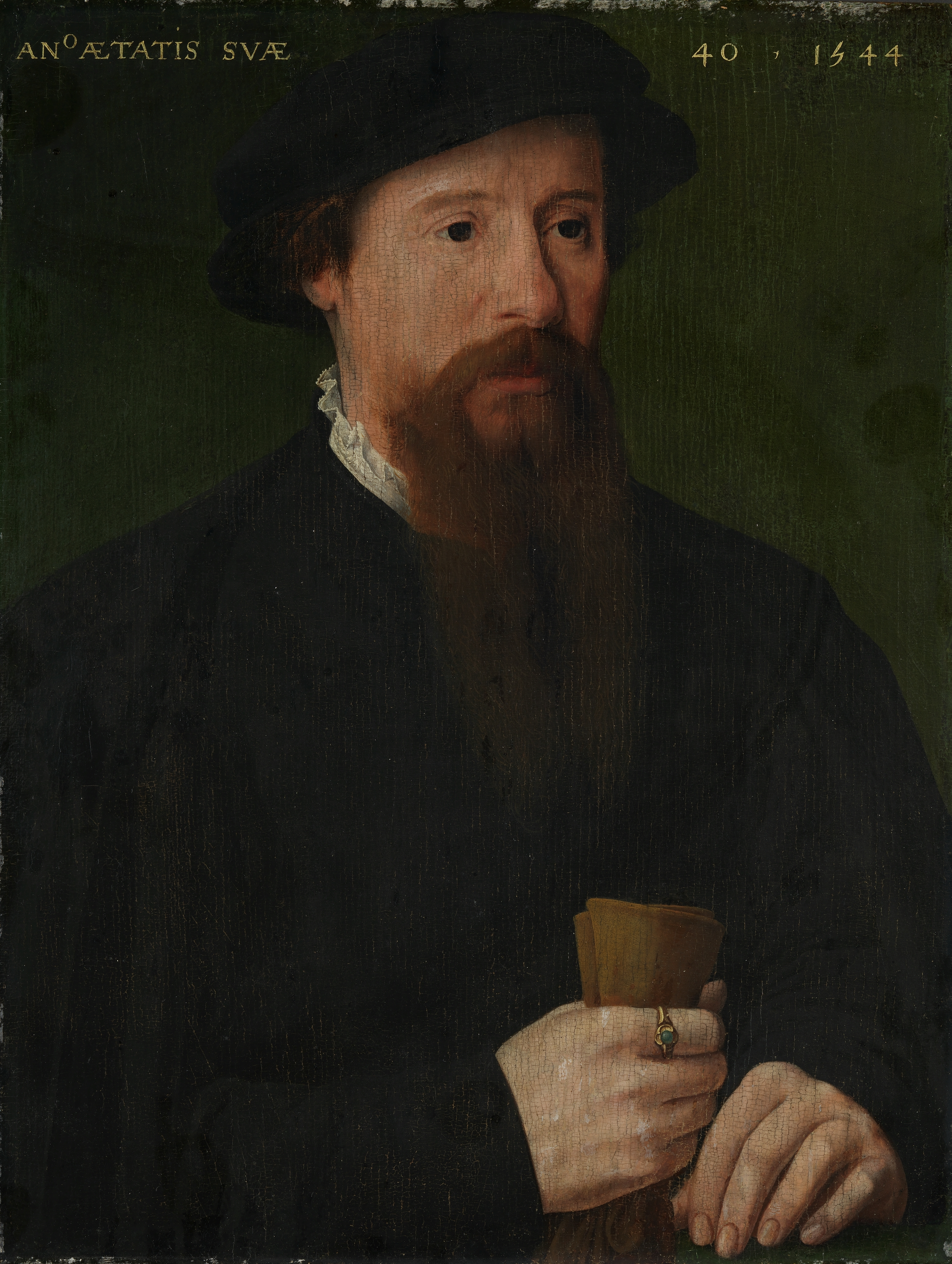
Portrait of a man, 35.5 × 30 cm, Inscriptions top: AN(O) AETATIS SVAE 40 1544. National Gallery (National Museum of Art, Architecture and Design), Oslo, Norway

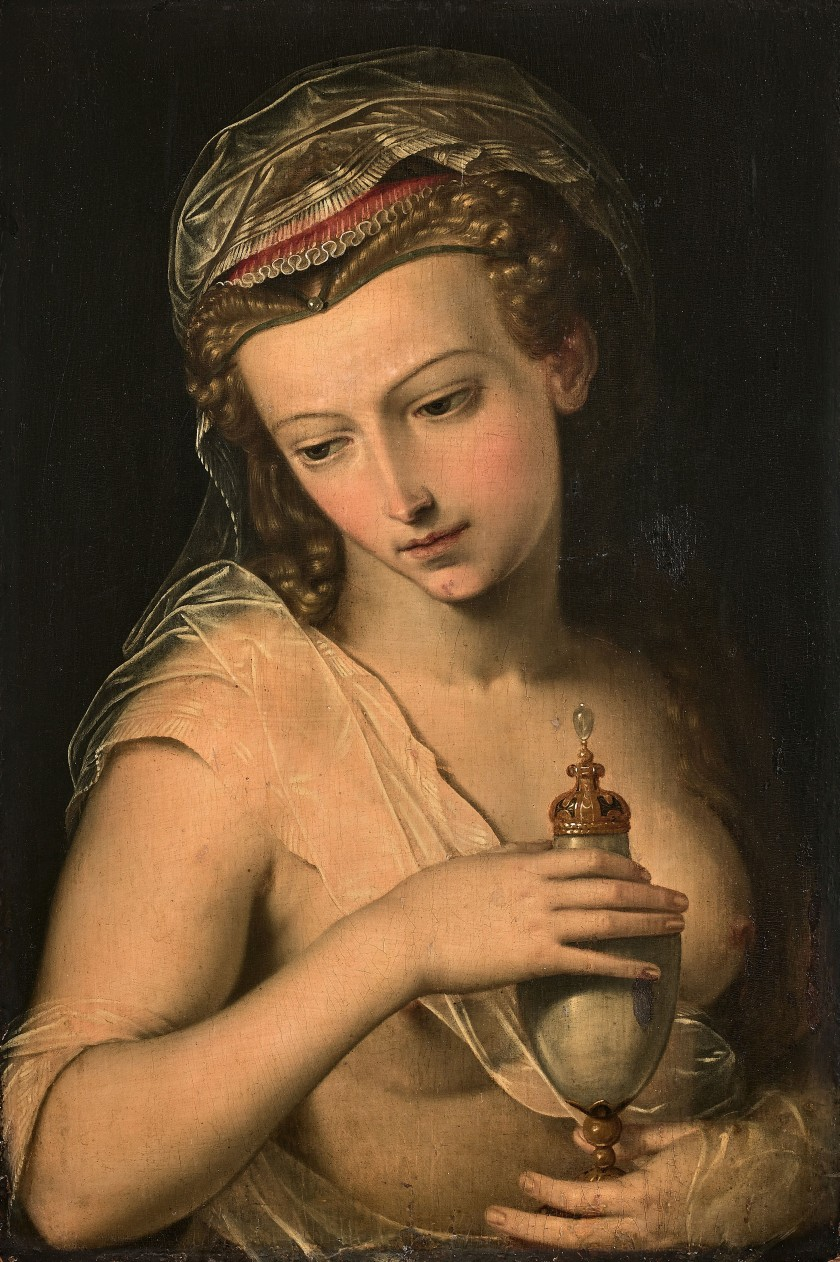
Mary Magdalene, c. 1559, 46 × 30.50 cm, oil on oak panel, attr. to P. Pourbus

=== Maps ===
1. Map of the Liberty of Bruges, oil on canvas, 151 × 322.5 cm, Groeningemuseum, Bruges
2. Plan of Ten Duinen Abbey in Koksijde, oil on canvas, 241 × 215 cm, Groeningemuseum, Bruges

== Publications ==
1. Paul Huvenne, PhD thesis, 1984, Ghent University.
2. Paul Huvenne, Pierre Pourbus, peintre brugeois, 1524–1584, cat. exp., Musée Memling (Hôpital Saint-Jean), 29 juin-30 septembre 1984, Bruges, Crédit Communal, 1984.
3. Paul Philippot, La Peinture dans les anciens Pays-Bas xve – xvie siècles, Paris, Flammarion, 1994, 303 p., (ISBN 978-2-08010-937-8), pp. 230–231.
4. Maryan W. Ainsworth, Win Blockmans, Till-Holger Borchert (et al.), Bruges et la Renaissance. De Memling à Pourbus, cat. expo., Bruges, 15 août-6 décembre 1998 Gand, Ludion; Paris, Flammarion; Bruges, Stichting Kunstboek, 1998, 319 p., (ISBN 90-5544-232-1).
5. Irene Smets, Le Musée Groeninge à Bruges : un choix des plus belles œuvres, Ludion, 2000, 127 p. (ISBN 978-9-05544-257-7).
6. (nl) Anne Van Oosterwijk, Maarten Bassens, Till-Holger Borchert, Heidi Deneweth, Brecht Dewilde (et al.), Vergeten Meesters, Pieter Pourbus en de Brugse schilderkunst van 1525 tot 1625, éd. : SNOECK GENT. Catalogue of the exposition at the Groeningemuseum, Bruges Oct.13, 2017 – Jan.21, 2018. 336 pages.
7. (en) Anne Van Oosterwijk, et al. The forgotten masters. Pieter Pourbus and Bruges painting from 1525 to 1625. [Ghent]: Snoeck, [2017]. ISBN 9789461614155. Catalogue of the exhibition at the Groeningemuseum, Bruges, Oct. 13, 2017 – Jan. 21, 2018. 336 pages.
8. (en) (nl) Marc de Beyer and Josephina de Fauw, Pieter Pourbus: meester-schilder uit Gouda = Pieter Pourbus: Master painter of Gouda. Gouda: Museum Gouda, 2018. ISBN 9789072660121. Catalogue of the exhibition in Museum Gouda, Feb. 17 – June 17, 2108. 86 pages.
