= Julius Goltzius =

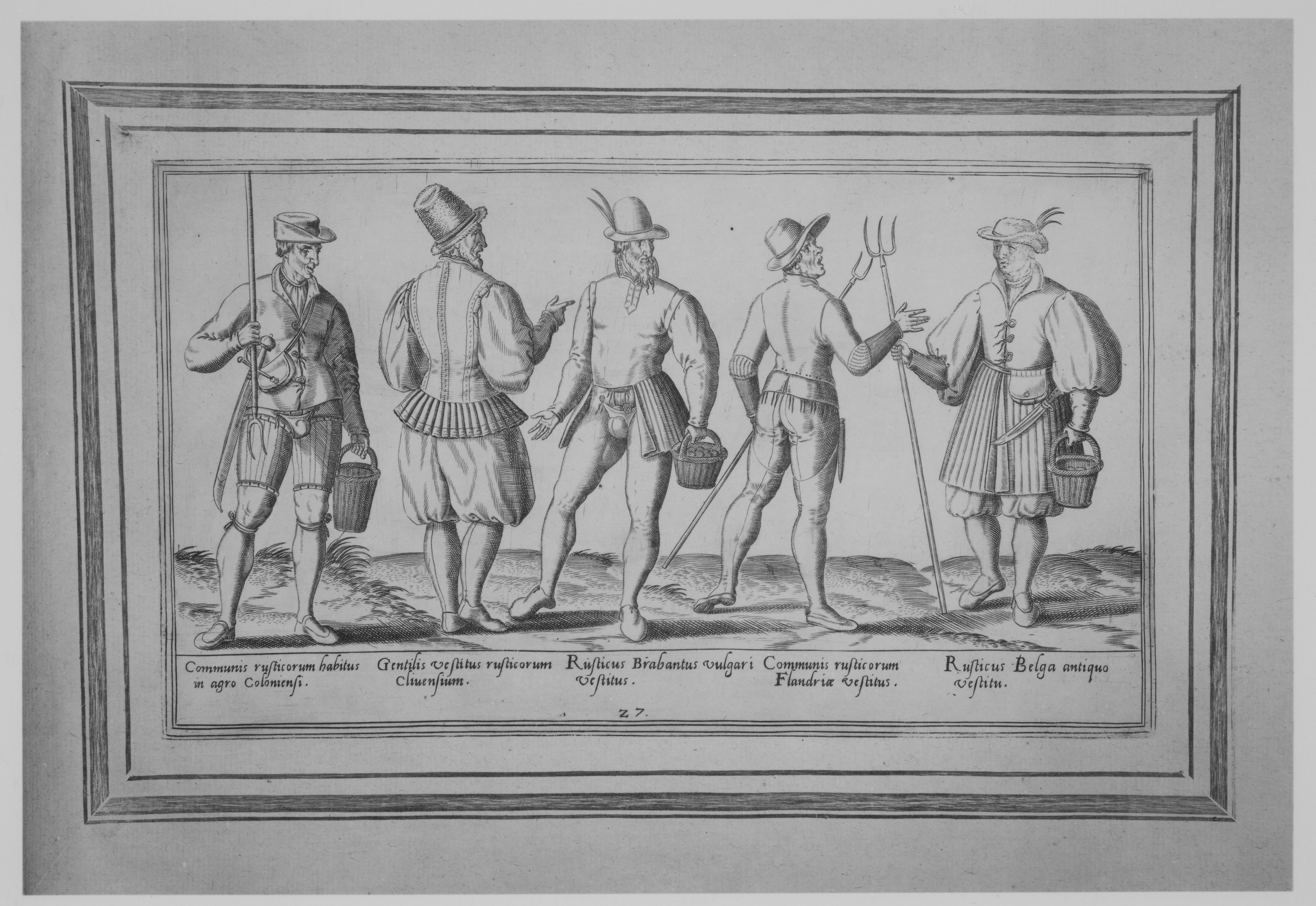
- Habitus variarum orbis gentium by Julius Goltzius
- Born: Antwerp
- Died: Antwerp
- Known for: Engraving

Julius Goltzius was a Flemish printmaker and publisher. He was probably born in Antwerp around 1555 as the son of the painter, printer, publisher and humanist Hubert Goltzius and his wife Elisabeth Verhulst. His mother came from a well-known family of painters and illuminators from Mechelen. Her sister Mayken Verhulst married Pieter Coecke van Aelst and became the mother-in-law of Pieter Bruegel the Elder. Julius Goltzius married in 1587 in Antwerp and probably died in that city well after 1601.

== Work ==
In 1575 he engraved some plates after the drawings of his elder brother Scipio, illustrating the numismatic publications of his father. From 1577 onwards he started to engrave book illustrations for Plantin's publications. He was regularly hired as an engraver by publishers based in Antwerp or Cologne (mostly for exiled Flemish artists and publishers) working amongst others after the designs of Jean-Jacques Boissard, Abraham de Bruyn, Anthonie Blocklandt van Montfoort and Maerten de Vos. His engravings representing satirical peasant scenes are well known. Their German texts suggest that they were mainly intended for the German market.

He later established himself as an independent publisher of prints. In 1601 he bought numerous printing plates at the sale of the estate of Volcxken Diericx, the widow of Hieronymus Cock. He had these plates - separate prints and series by and after artists such as Frans Floris, Cornelis Cort, Johannes Wierix, Martin Schongauer and others - reprinted, adding his own address.
