= Hendrik Hondius I =

Flemish-born engraver, cartographer and publisher (1573–c. 1650)

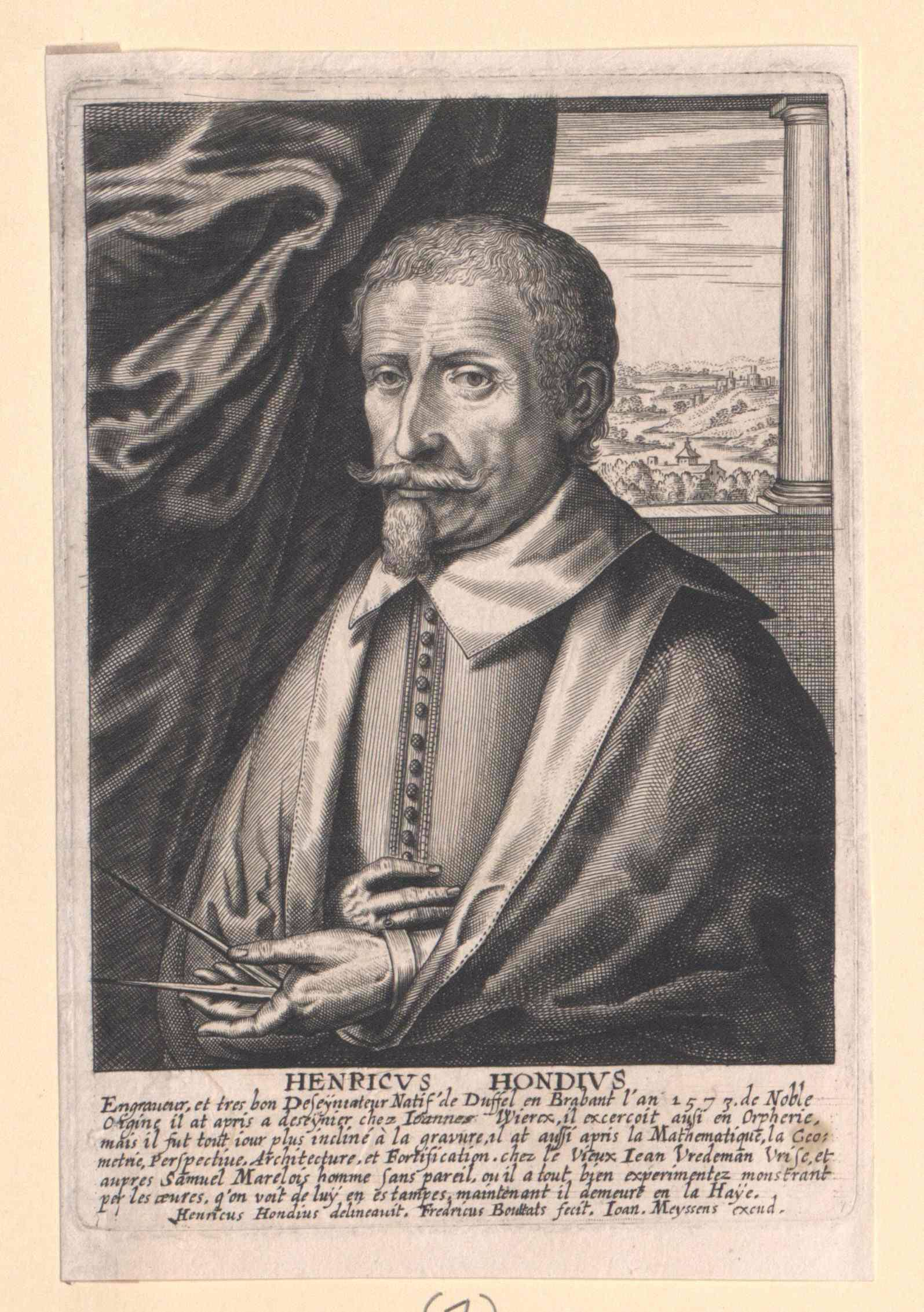
Hondius in a 1662 engraving in Het Gulden Cabinet by Frederik Bouttats the Younger

Hendrik Hondius I (born Hendrik de Hondt; 9 June 1573 – c. 1650) was a Flemish-born and trained engraver, cartographer, and publisher who settled in the Dutch Republic in 1597.

== Early life and education ==
Hendrik Hondius was born in Duffel, in the Duchy of Brabant (then part of the Habsburg Netherlands), to Guillam (Willem) de Hondt, a philologist. He spent part of his childhood in Mechelen, where he learned to write, according to the 17th-century Flemish biographer Cornelis de Bie. After the death of his father, he moved with his mother to Antwerp.

After his mother remarried, he was apprenticed in Brussels to the goldsmith Godfried van Ghelder, who worked for Alexander Farnese, Duke of Parma. He also studied drawing with the engraver Jan Wierix of Antwerp. At this time he started to study engraving.

He applied himself to mathematics and studied perspective, architecture and the construction of fortifications with Hans Vredeman de Vries and Samuel Marelois.

After travelling to Cologne, London and Paris, he married Sara Jansdochter, the daughter of a goldsmith from Antwerp. The couple moved to The Hague by 1597. In that year he registered with the local artists' guild.

== Career ==
He obtained his first print privilege for a portrait of Prince Maurits. He dedicated himself to his engraving practice. His work was very well received and he got commissions from many eminent personalities for engravings or drawings.

He was granted a general privilege by the States General of the Netherlands in 1599. Hondius was thus the first publisher to obtain a national privilege until Peter Paul Rubens in 1618. The privilege provided protection against circulation in the Dutch Republic of copies of his published works.

He moved to Amsterdam in 1603 and Leiden in 1604–1605. Here he published with the printer Breukel Cornelisz Nieulandt of The Hague the book Perspective by Hans Vredeman de Vries. He returned to settle in The Hague in 1605.

After his return to The Hague his prints displayed the Buitenhof as his address. The young Constantijn Huygens followed in 1611 for three months drawing classes with Hondius. Hondius bought in 1614 a large house between the Binnenhof and the Gevangenpoort in The Hague which he used as work and living quarters. He joined in 1617 the local church counsel where he adopted an anti-catholic and anti-arminian standpoint.

He had a flourishing printing business in The Hague, which was continued by his sons Willem and Hendrik. Initially he hired printers to do his printing until he bought his own printing press in 1620. He turned more to publishing rather than engraving and printing in the 1630s. His publications were mainly maps, books about fortifications and official portraits. He also reused original plates and blocks by earlier artists for reprinting and such reprints represented almost a third of his publishing output. In the 1640s he returned to printing concentrating exclusively on etching. He remained active as a printmaker and draughtsman until his final years.

== Effigies ==
One of the most important publications of Hondius was the work Pictorum aliquot celebrium praecipue Germaniae inferioris Effigies (Effigies of some celebrated painters, chiefly of Lower Germany) of 1610, which was a collection of 69 portraits of mainly Netherlandish artists. Of these portraits, 22 were reworked versions of portraits contained in a book with almost the same title by Dominicus Lampsonius that was published in Antwerp in 1572 by Volcxken Diericx, the widow of Hieronymous Cock. The 1572 book contained 23 portraits of early Netherlandish artists, all of whom had died before the publication, including a portrait of Hieronymous Cock who had died while preparing the publication. Through his 1610 book Hondius updated and expanded the canon of Netherlandish painting. He included some German and English artists in an apparent attempt to situate the Netherlanders within a broader, more semantically uncertain 'Northern' canon. Hondius constructed the series as part of a continual celebration of past and present Netherlandish artists. Hondius did not include in his book the portrait of Cock, which was the last portrait in the 1572 publication.

Hondius did not identify the authorship of the individual engravings (most of which were done by the Wierix brothers in the Lampsonius series). Like in the 1572 publication, he added Latin poems underneath each portrait with a short description of the specific qualities of each artist.

== Publications ==
- Icones virorum nostra patrumque memoria illustrium, quorum opera cum literarum studia tum vera religio fuit restaurata, ab Henrico Hondio sculptae, aeneisque tipis excusae, 1599
- Praestantium aliquot theologorum qui Rom. Antichristum praecipue oppugnarunt, effigies, 1602, with Jacobus Verheiden
- With Hans Vredeman de Vries (whose portrait he engraved), a book on Perspective, Leiden, 1604–1605
- Pictorum aliquot celebrium praecipue Germaniae Inferioris effigies, Hagae Comitis, 1610
- Belgiae Pacificatorum vera delinealio. Pourtraicture vraye des pacificaleurs des Pays Bas. True likenesses of the peacemakers of the Netherlands, Hagae Comitis Ex off. Henri Hondii, 1608
- Topographia variarum regionum etc. ou les vues d'après nature, by Matthijs Bril, engraved by Henri Hondius, 1611, 1614
- Pompe funèbre de Charles V, exécutée par ordre de Philippe II, Brussels, Joan à Duelecum, Luc. Duetecum fec. Hondius exec., 1619
- Korte Beschrijvinge ende afbeeldinge der generale regelen der fortificatie, der artillerie munitie ende vivres van deselver en hare commissien van de leger, aerde wallen de approchen met het legenweer ende van vyerwerken, Hagae-Comitis, 1624
- Onderwijsinge in de Perspective Conste, door Henricus Hondius, The Hague, 1623
- Alghemeine regelen der sterkebouw, The Hague, 1625
- Theatrum honoris in quo nostri Apelles saeculi, seu pictorum, qui patrum nostrorum memoria vixerunt, celebriorum pracipue quos Belgium tulit, verae et advivum expressae imagines in aes incisae exhibeniur, Amsterdam, 1612, 1618
- Les hommes illustres, gravés et imprimés par H.H.
- Les portraits des hérésiarques et autres hommes illustres par H. Hondius, J. Muller, J. Matham, J. Stadeler, etc.
