= Dominicus Lampsonius =

Flemish humanist & painter (1532–1599)

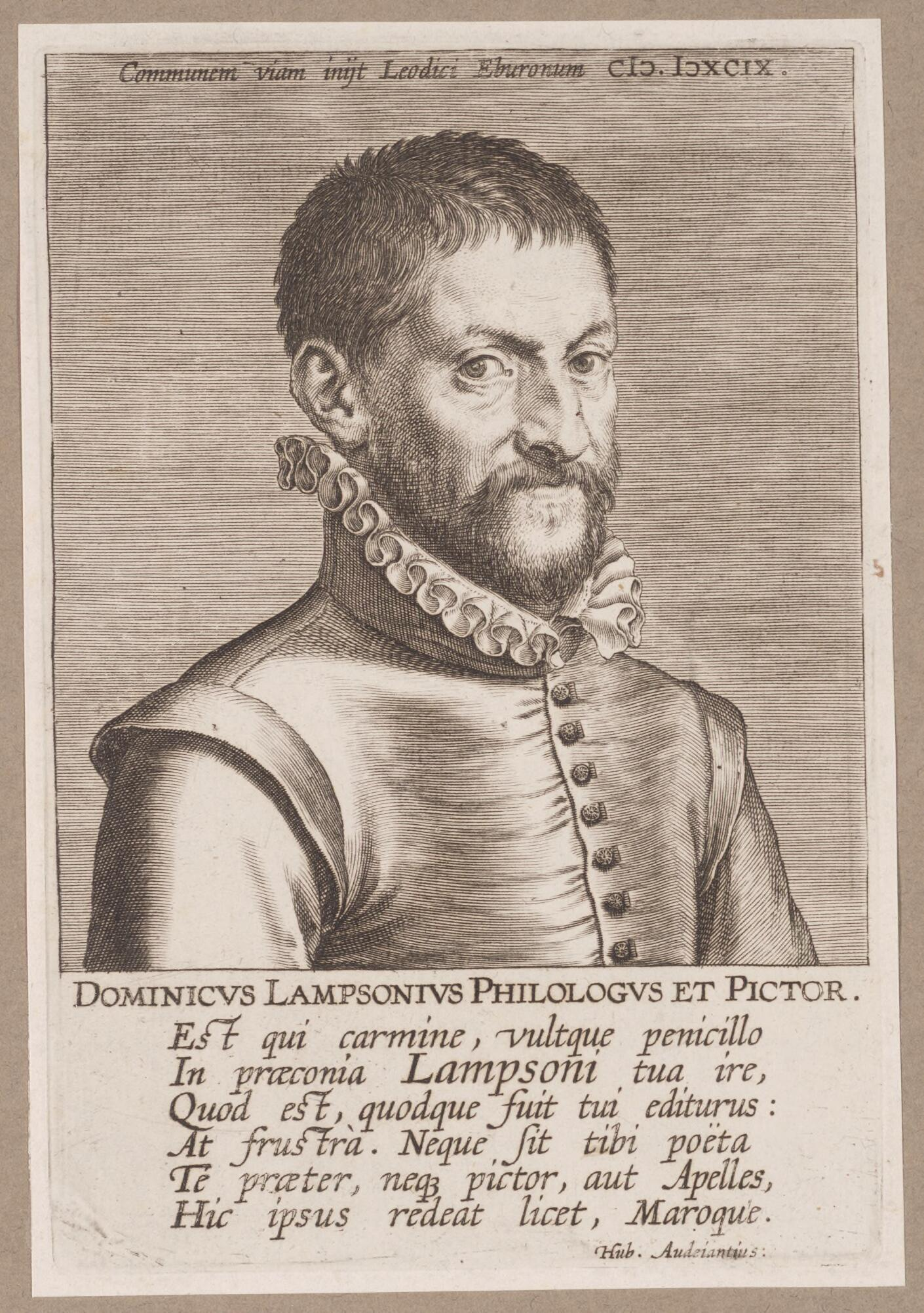
Lampsonius, by Hendrik Goltzius.

Dominicus Lampsonius (Latinised form of Dominique Lampsone) (1532, in Bruges – 1599, in Liège) was a Flemish humanist, poet and painter. A secretary to various Prince-Bishops of Liège, he maintained an extensive correspondence with humanists and artists at home and abroad. His writings on Netherlandish artists formed an important contribution to the formation of the so-called Netherlandish canon.

== Life ==
Lampsonius studied arts and sciences at the University of Leuven. In 1554, he went to England to serve as secretary to Reginald Pole, a prominent humanist and Roman Catholic Cardinal. After Pole's death in 1558, he traveled to Liège where he was secretary to the successive Prince-Bishops (Robert of Berghes, Gerard of Grœsbeek, and Ernest of Bavaria). He thus regularly collaborated with Laevinus Torrentius who was the vicar of the Prince-Bishops until 1586 after which he became Bishop of Antwerp.

Lampsonius was for a while the teacher of Otto van Veen, a painter and humanist who would later be one of the masters of Peter Paul Rubens. He became friends and engaged in intensive correspondence with some of the leading humanists of his time such as Justus Lipsius, Janus Dousa, Johannes Livineius and Petrus Oranus.

He provided the Italian historian Lodovico Guicciardini, then a resident of Flanders, with information for his history of the Low Countries entitled Descrittione di Lodovico Guicciardini patritio fiorentino di tutti i Paesi Bassi altrimenti detti Germania inferiore (1567; The Description of the Low Countreys). He was a correspondent of the Italian art historian Giorgio Vasari, who relied upon him for his notes about the life and works of the Liège painter Lambert Lombard. In one of his letters to Vasari, Lampsonius defended Netherlandish art against some of the disparaging remarks that Vasari had made in his Vite. In a letter written to Vasari before the publication of the second edition of the Vite Lampsonius deplored the poor quality of recent prints of Italian art works, which, according to him, did not fully convey the excellence of the originals. Lampsonius suggested that Northern engravers should collaborate with Italian artists to improve this. He also asked Vasari to include in the revised edition of the Vite treatises on the three arts of sculpture, painting and architecture, with drawings and information about the secrets of the arts.

He further conducted a regular correspondence with Giulio Clovio to whom he proposed a project to engrave Michelangelo's works in a skilful manner so that those who had not visited Rome could appreciate what they looked like.

== Correspondence with Vasari ==
Dominicus Lampsonius maintained a regular correspondence with Giorgio Vasari. The content of two letters is known. The first, dated 30 October 1564, was partly incorporated into Vasari’s Vite. In this passage Vasari praised Lampsonius as "a well-learned and knowledgeable man," formerly a close confidant of Cardinal Reginald Pole, and at that time serving as secretary to the Prince-Bishop of Liège.

The second letter, dated 25 April 1565, has been preserved in full. At the end of this letter Lampsonius responded to Vasari’s question whether more Netherlandish painters should be included in the Vite by noting that he had already supplied the relevant names and details in earlier letters. These earlier lists are not extant, but the names are reflected in the chapter “Di diversi Fiamminghi” in the 1568 edition of the Vite.

This information from Lampsonius was about four years more recent than the data provided by Lodovico Guicciardini in his Descrittione (1567). It is noteworthy that in the revised 1568 Vite Bruegel is mentioned a second time as “Pietro Broghel d’Anversa,” and the earlier designation “Pietro Brueghel di Breda” no longer appears.

== Portraits of some celebrated artists ==
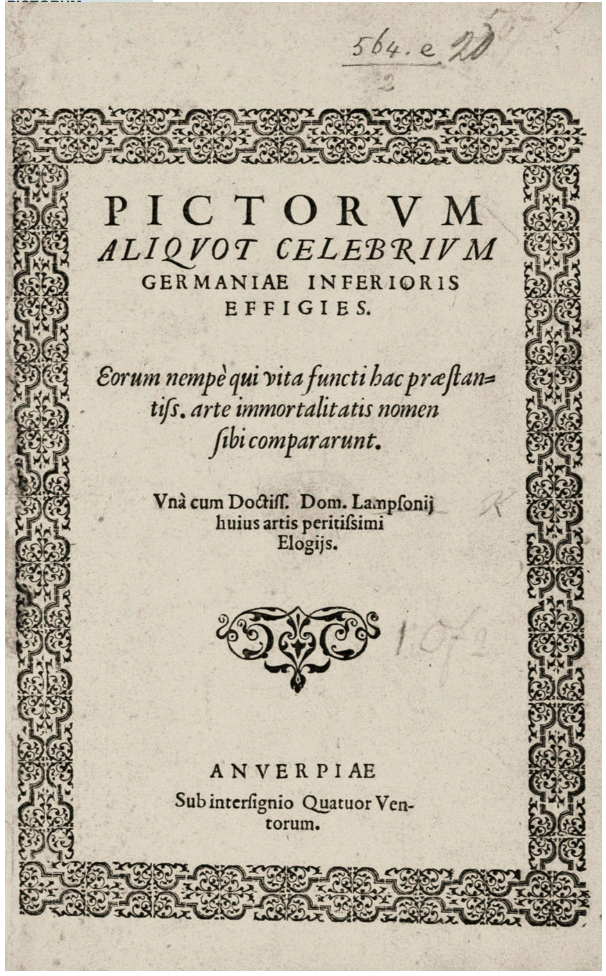
Title page of Pictorum aliquot celebrium Germaniae inferioris effigies

In 1572 Lampsonius published under his own name a set of 23 engraved portraits of artists from the Low Countries under the title Pictorum aliquot celebrium Germaniae inferioris effigies (literal translation: Effigies of some celebrated painters of Lower Germany). Lampsonius provided poems in Latin to accompany the individual portraits. This work was under preparation by the leading Antwerp publisher Hieronymous Cock who died before it was completed. It was then published by Cock's widow Volcxken Dierix who continued the publishing business after her husband's death.

The artists included in the book are (in this order): Hubert van Eyck, Jan van Eyck, Hieronymus Bosch, Rogier van der Weyden, Dirk Bouts, Bernard van Orley, Jan Mabuse, Joachim Patinir, Quentin Matsys, Lucas van Leyden, Jan van Amstel, Joos van Cleve, Matthys Cock, Herri met de Bles, Jan Cornelisz Vermeyen, Pieter Coecke van Aelst, Jan van Scorel, Lambert Lombard, Pieter Bruegel the Elder, Willem Key, Lucas Gassel, Frans Floris, and Hieronymus Cock.

Since all the depicted artists were dead at the time of publication, Lampsonius included a dedicatory poem that qualified the work as a whole as an act of mourning and readers of the book are asked to ‘be the companions’ of the late Hieronymous Cock and his predecessors in a funeral procession. The book includes a poem by Lampsonius dedicated to the memory of Hieronymus Cock and applauding the work of his widow. The portraits and texts present an honour roll of the earlier generations of Netherlandish artists. Their publication thus contributed to the formation of a canon of famous Netherlandish painters, which was well underway even before Karel van Mander published his biographies of early and contemporary Netherlandish artists in his Schilder-boeck of 1604. Lampsonius thus attempted to place Netherlandish art on the same level as Italian art, which he admired. He seems, however, to have resigned himself tacitly to the difference in rank between Italian and Netherlandish art. He writes in his poem on the painter Jan van Amstel that 'The Netherlanders are particularly praised as good painters of landscapes, the Italians of people or gods. No wonder: it stands to reason that the proverb says that the Italian has his brain in his head and the Netherlander in his diligent hand.'

The quality of the 23 prints was outstanding as they had been made by some of the leading engravers of the time such as Jan Wierix, Adriaen Collaert and Cornelis Cort. The portraits are rendered with a metallic sharpness and brilliance. The prints constitute a visually harmonious series.

Hendrik Hondius I published in 1610 a book with almost the same title ('Pictorum aliquot celebrium, præcipué Germaniæ Inferioris', in English: 'Effigies of some celebrated painters, chiefly of Lower Germany') that contained 69 engraved portraits of painters. Hondius' work included in its first part reworked versions of 22 of the portraits of the 1572 publication. The portrait of Hieronymus Cock (often numbered 23) was not included by Hondius maybe because the likeness was made after death, rather than drawn "ad vivum" or after the living model as was the case for the other portraits.

== Other writings ==
Lampsonius wrote numerous poems and epigrams in Latin. Lampsonius also was the author of Lamberti Lombardi Apvd Ebvrones Pictoris Celeberrimi Vita (The Life of Lambert Lombard), a biography of his art teacher Lambert Lombard (1565). This was the first biography about a Northern artist ever published. In the book, Lampsonius defended Lombard's art in the book and pronounced Lombard to be the equal of Vasari as a painter. Lampsonius noted that Lambert worked more for love of art than for money, an idea promoted in ancient times by Pliny the Elder and shared by Lampsonius.

== Painting ==
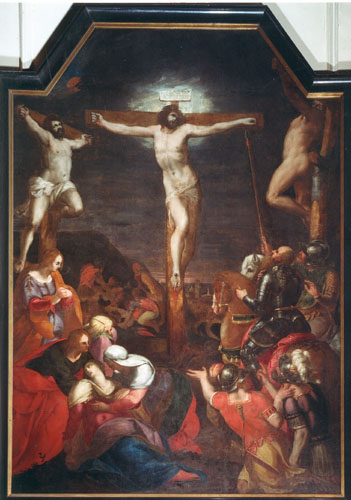
Crucifixion by Lampsonius in the Saint Quentin Cathedral in Hasselt

Lampsonius dedicated himself for some time successfully to the art of painting. He was assisted in his efforts by Lambert Lombard, the eminent Renaissance painter of Liège. Lampsonius' only known extant painting is a Crucifixion scene dated 1576.
