= Master of the Small Landscapes =

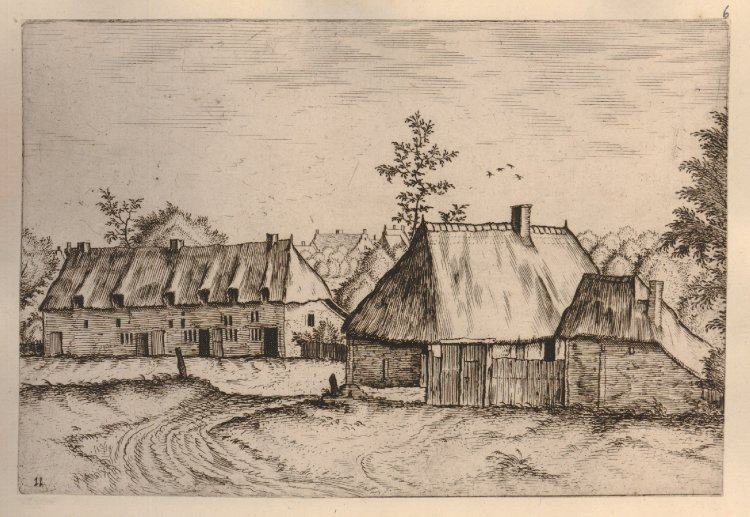
Landscape with view of a village, published by Hieronymus Cock

The Master of the Small Landscapes (in Dutch: Meester van de Kleine Landschappen) was a Flemish artist from the mid-16th century known for his landscape drawings. The name of this unidentified artist is derived from a series of 44 prints of landscapes that were created after the artist’s drawings, some of which have been preserved. Together with the work of Pieter Bruegel the Elder, the drawings of the Master played an important role in the evolution of Northern Renaissance landscape art from the world landscape into an independent genre.

== Publication history ==
The prints were published by Hieronymus Cock in Antwerp in two series. The first series was published in 1559 with the title Multifarium casularum ruriumque lineamenta curiose ad vivum expressa (translated as: 'Many and very beautiful places of diverse village dwellings, homesteads, files, streets, and such like, and furnished with all sorts of small animals. Altogether drawn from life and primarily located around Antwerp'). The first series contained 14 sheets.

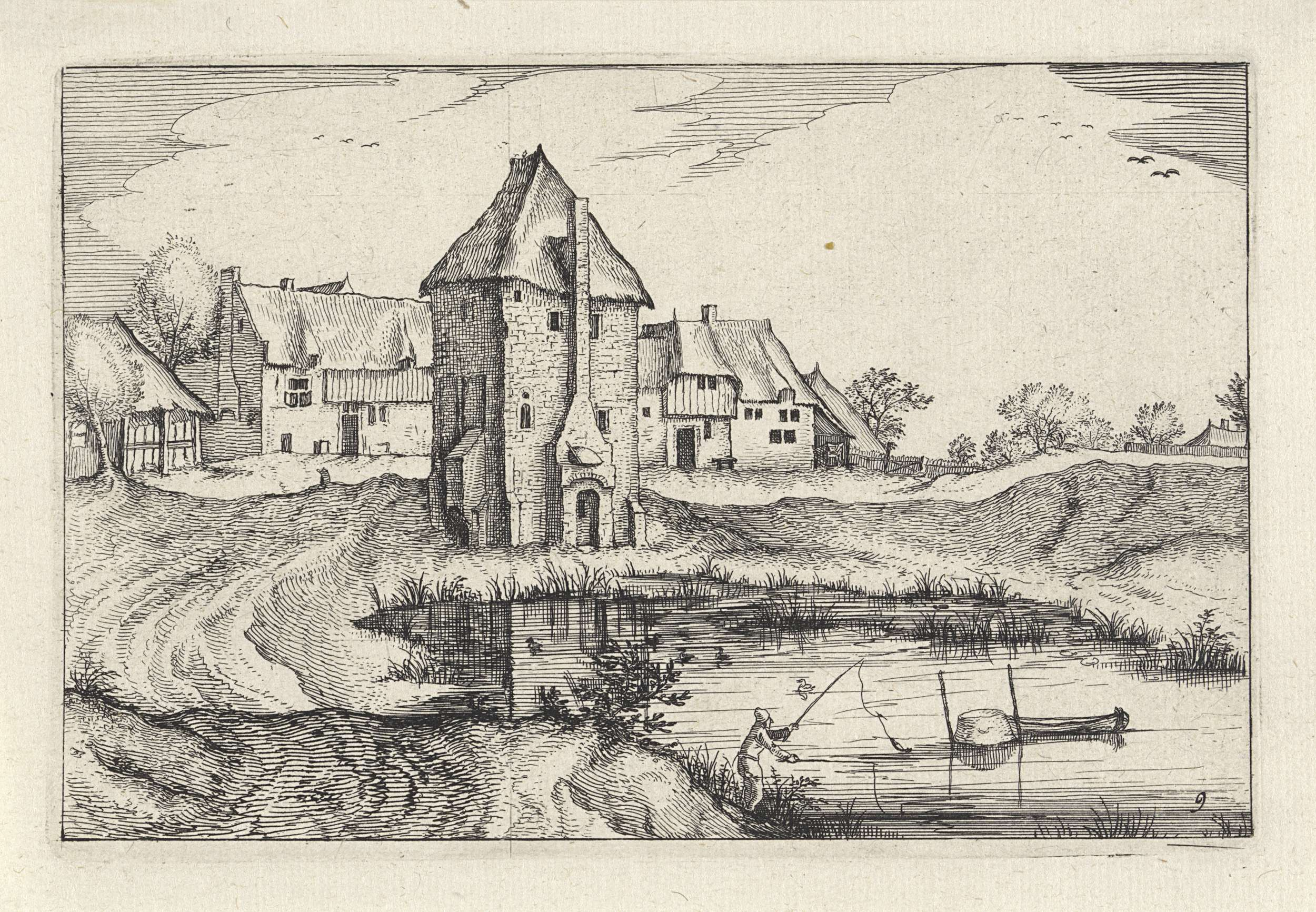
Tower on a river, published by Claes Jansz. Visscher

The second series was published in 1561 with the title Praediorum villarum et rusticarum caularum icons elegantissimi ('Elegant pictures of country manours, villas and cottages drawn from life in copper plates'). The second series contained 30 sheets. An edition of both volumes together also appeared 1561.

A third edition was published by Philips Galle in 1601 in Antwerp under the title Regiunculae et villae aliquot ducatus Brabantiae a. P. Breughelio delineatae et in pictorum gratiam a Nicolao Joannis Piscatore excusae et in lucem editae, Amstelodami ('Small Counties and Villages primarily in the duchy of Brabant'). His son Theodoor Galle published the series again a few years later (probably in 1610). In 1612 Claes Jansz. Visscher published a further edition of 26 of the original 44 views in Amsterdam. Visscher created a new title page and added two additional prints at the end of the series.

The first two editions by Cock were not particularly successful but the 1601 Galle edition, on the other hand, was quite successful.

== Attribution of the drawings and prints ==
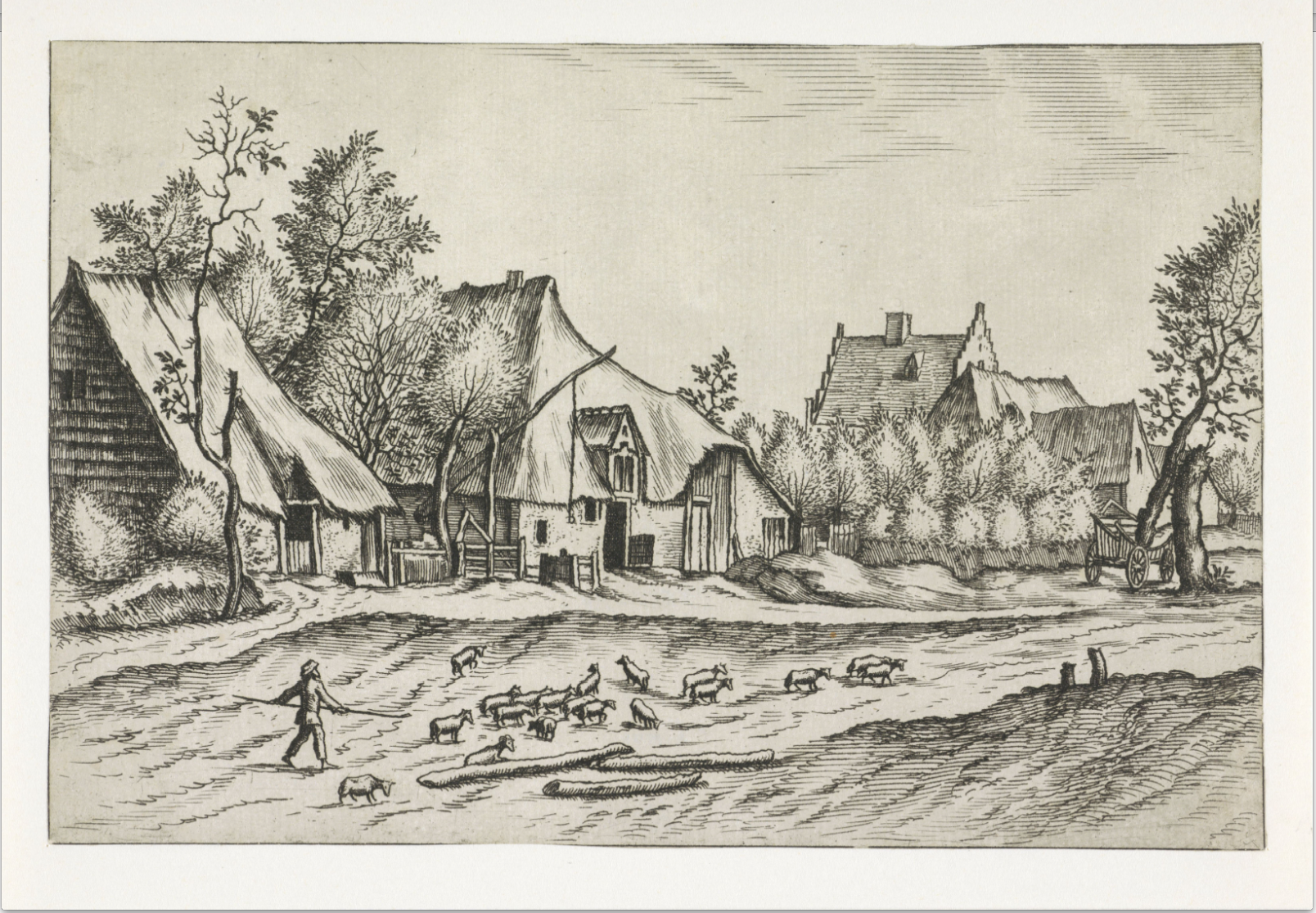
Village road with flock of sheep, published by Hieronymus Cock

The publications of Cock did not name the artist responsible for the designs. The original title page only stated that the landscapes were drawn from nature in the vicinity of Antwerp. Philips Galle's 1601 edition attributed the designs to Cornelis Cort while Claes Jansz. Visscher described them as 'some country farms and cottages of the duchy of Brabant, drawn by P. Bruegel'. These attributions to Cort and Bruegel are now generally regarded as unsubstantiated.

The following candidates have been proposed for identification with the Master of the Small Landscapes: Hieronymus Cock, Cornelis van Dalem, Hans Bol and Joos van Liere. Some scholars have divided the authorship of the Small Landscapes drawings between two or more artists. Others believe the artist to be an unknown, independent master.

The original prints were probably engraved by Jan and Lucas van Doetechum. The later Dutch reprint contained engravings by Claes Jansz. Visscher himself as the original plates for the series had remained in Antwerp in the possession of the Galle publishing house. Visscher made changes to the original prints by reducing their size, cropping the images and making alterations to the staffage. He changed or moved the original figures and added new figures.

== The drawings ==
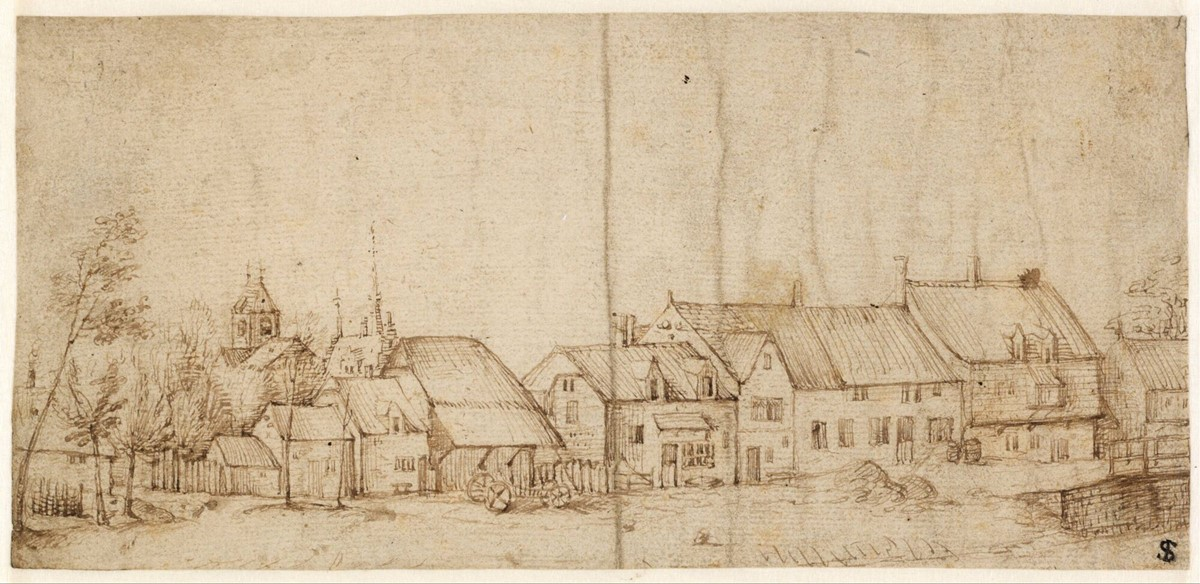
Village View, ink on paper

Many of the drawings that formed the basis for the series of prints have been preserved and are in the collections of the Metropolitan Museum, the Fitzwilliam Museum, the Harvard Art Museums, the Museum Boijmans Van Beuningen and Chatsworth House.

== Art historical significance ==
The works of the Master of the small landscapes constitute an important link in the evolution of the landscape into an independent genre. The landscape as developed in the first half of the 16th century by Netherlandish artists such as Joachim Patinir is referred to as 'world landscape'. These world landscapes represented imaginary panoramic landscapes seen from an elevated viewpoint and usually included a Biblical or historical narrative. Pieter Bruegel the Elder’s 'Large Landscapes' published by Hieronymus Cock in the mid 1550s included non-narrative world landscapes as well as religious subjects. A further evolution was the series of 'Landscapes with Biblical and Mythological Scenes' published in 1558 by Hieronymus Cock after designs by his brother Matthys Cock. This series showed that there was an increased interest in landscapes with serious subjects but without any need for consistency of either religious or mythological themes.

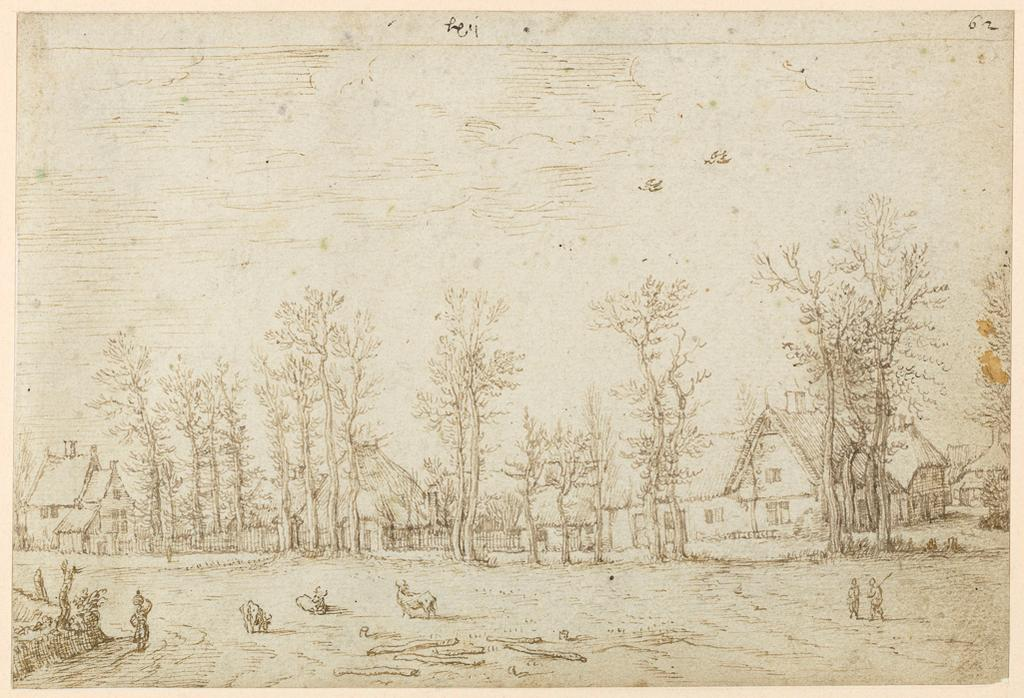
A Flemish village, ink on paper

The series of the Small Landscapes was published the next year. Rather than the imaginary, distant landscapes with religious content of the world landscape, the series consisted of close-up renderings at eye-level of identifiable country estates and villages populated with figures engaged in daily activities. By abandoning the panoramic viewpoint of the world landscape and focusing on the humble, rural and even topographical, the Small Landscapes set the stage for Netherlandish landscape painting in the 17th century. The Small Landscapes depicted real rather than imaginary landscapes and some of their subjects have been identified. After the publication of the Small Landscapes, landscape artists either continued with the world landscape or followed the new mode presented by the Small Landscapes.

This evolution in the representation of the landscape reflected a shift in the clientele for art towards the urban middle-class, who regarded both the countryside and its peasants from a hierarchical distance as well as a pleasurable condescension and even humor. It also represented a philosophical move towards a humanist view of the world as reflected by the humanist philosopher Desiderius Erasmus in his work the 'Antibarbarians', which glorified the enjoyment of a 'sancta rusticitas' (holy rusticity) in the countryside as a means to cultivate true wisdom.
