= Goltzius (disambiguation) =

Goltzius is the name of

- Dominicus Goltzius (1644–1721), Dutch preacher
- Hendrick Goltzius (1558–1616), Dutch engraver and painter
- Hubert Goltzius, also known as Hubrecht Goltzius the younger, (1526–1583), Dutch humanist, printer, numismatist, engraver and painter
- Hubrecht Goltzius, also known as Hubrecht Golz, (died first half 16th century), Dutch painter
- Jakob Goltzius (died in the 16th century), Dutch engraver
- Julius Goltzius (died end of the 16th century), Dutch engraver
