= Hieronymus Cock =

Dutch engraver and printmaker (1518–1570)

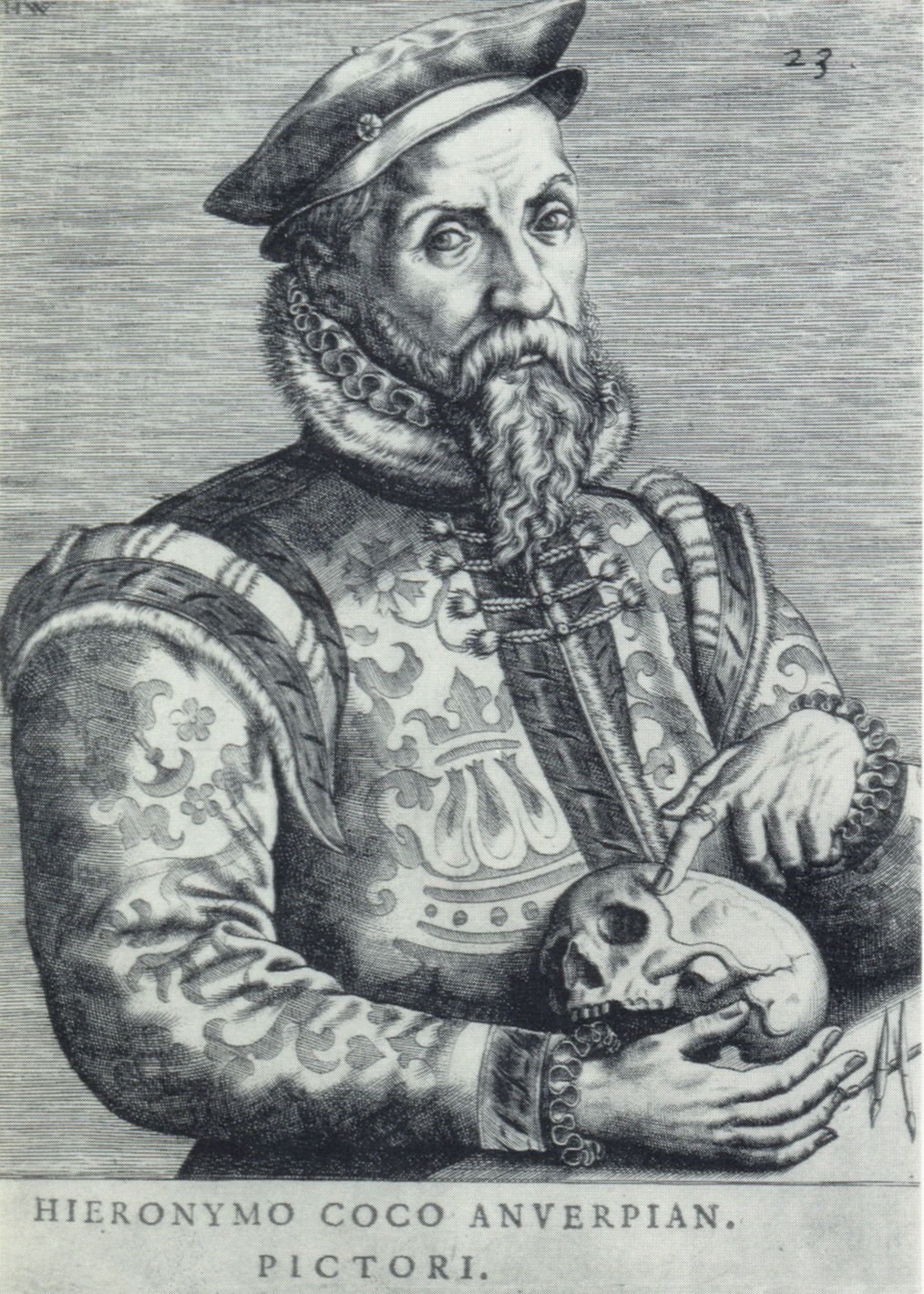
- Portrait of Hieronymus Cock by Johannes Wierix
- Born: 1518; Antwerp
- Died: October 1570 (aged 51–52); Antwerp
- Known for: Painting, printmaking, printing
- Movement: Renaissance

Hieronymus Cock, or Hieronymus Wellens de Cock, (1518 – 3 October 1570) was a Flemish painter and etcher as well as a publisher and distributor of prints. Cock is regarded as one of the most important print publishers of his time in northern Europe. His publishing house played a key role in the transformation of printmaking from an activity of individual artists and craftsmen into an industry based on division of labour. His house published more than 1,100 prints between 1548 and his death in 1570, a vast number by earlier standards.

While far more important and influential as a publisher, Cock was also an artist of talent, as seen in his last series of 12 landscape etchings of 1558, which are somewhat in the fantastic style of the paintings of his brother Matthys Cock. Altogether he etched 62 plates.

== Life ==
Hieronymus Cock was born into an artistic family. His father Jan Wellens de Cock and his brother Matthys Cock were both painters and draftsmen. He was admitted as a master painter in the Guild of Saint Luke in Antwerp in 1545. He resided in Rome from 1546 to 1547. When he returned to Antwerp in 1547, he married Volcxken Diericx. Together with his wife he founded in 1548 the publishing house Aux quatre vents or In de Vier Winden (the "House of the Four Winds"). The publishing house issued its first prints in 1548. The majority of Cock's prints were made after paintings or designs purposely made for him by artists from the Low Countries such as Frans Floris, Pieter Brueghel the Elder, Lambert Lombard, Maarten van Heemskerck and Hieronymus Bosch as well as architectural and ornament designs by Cornelis Floris and Hans Vredeman de Vries.

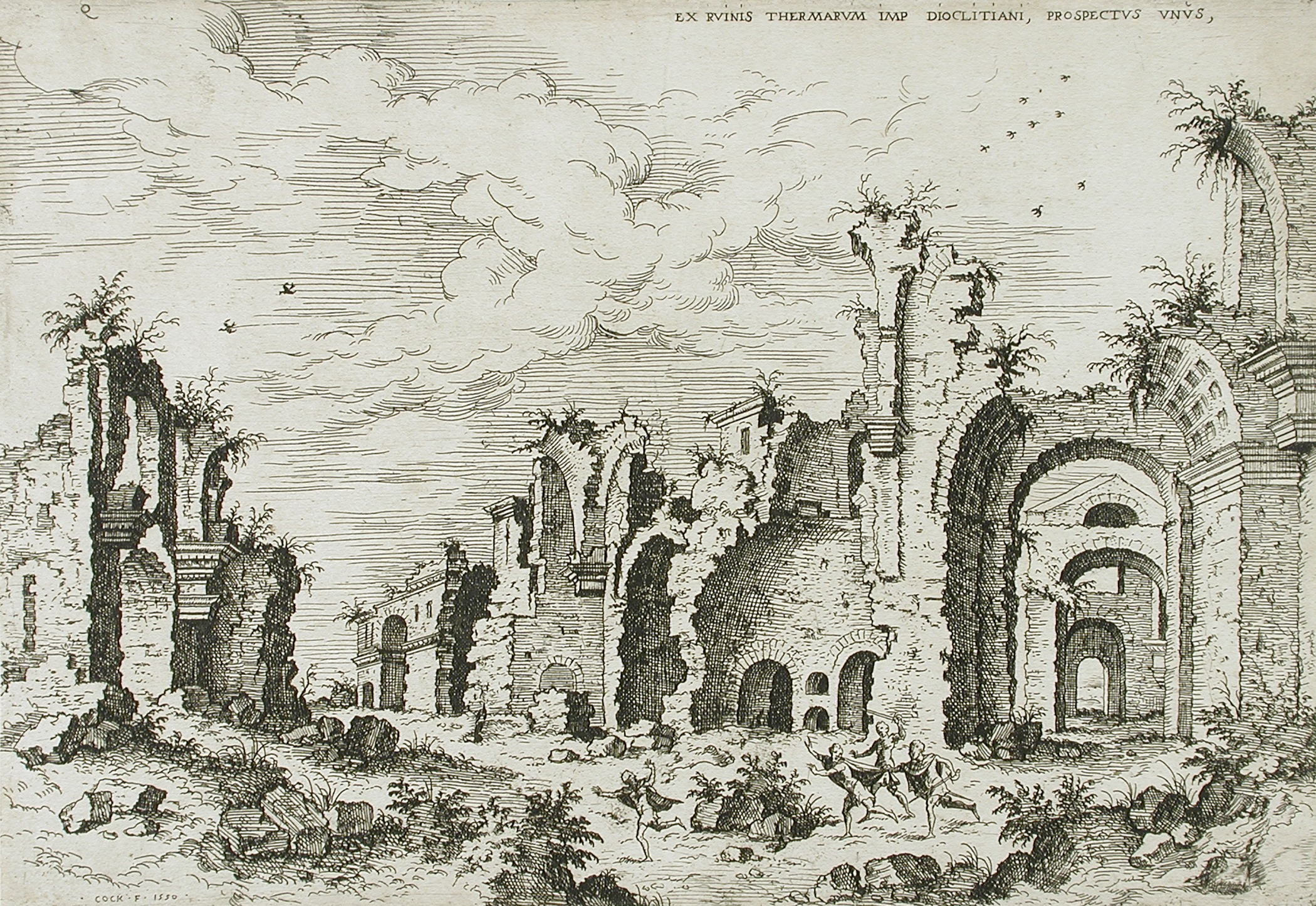
Ruins of the Baths of Diocletian , c. 1550, by Hieronymus Cock from set of Roman Ruins

Cock employed some of the best engravers of his time such as Johannes Wierix, Adriaen Collaert, Philip Galle, Cornelis Cort and the Italian Giorgio Ghisi.

In 1559 and 1561 he published two series of landscape prints by an anonymous Flemish draughtsman now referred to as the Master of the Small Landscapes. The series of landscapes were drawn from nature in the vicinity of Antwerp and had an important influence on the development of Flemish and Dutch realist landscape art.

== Quatre Vents ==
The publishing house Aux Quatre Vents played an important role in the spread of the Italian High Renaissance throughout northern Europe as Cock published prints made by prominent engravers such as Giorgio Ghisi, Dirck Volckertsz Coornhert and Cornelis Cort after the work of leading Italian painters like Raphael, Primaticcio, Bronzino, Giulio Romano and Andrea del Sarto. The Italian historian of architecture Vincenzo Scamozzi copied many of the engravings published by Cock in 1551 for his volume on Rome entitled 'Discorsi sopra L'antichita di Roma' (Venice: Ziletti, 1583).

Cock etched and published a number of prints of sieges and battles, nearly all of Habsburg victories, in the years 1549 to 1558, and it seems that issuing maps of current military events must have been one of Cock’s early priorities after establishing his business in 1548 and obtaining a licence to publish prints in January 1549.

Cock collaborated with the Spanish cartographer Diego Gutiérrez on a 1562 Map of America. This map encompasses the eastern coast of North America, the entire Central and South America and parts of the western coasts of Europe and Africa, and is the earliest scale wall map of the New World and the first to use the name "California".

Hieronymus Cock collaborated with Antwerp architect and designer Cornelis Floris de Vriendt in the publishing of Cornelis Floris' designs for monuments and ornaments: the Veelderley niewe inuentien van antycksche sepultueren ('The many new designs of antique sculptures') was published in 1557 and the Veelderley veranderinghe van grotissen ('Many varieties of grotesques') in 1556. The publication of these books contributed to the spread of the so-called Floris style throughout the Netherlands.

The Dutch publisher Philip Galle worked at Cock's printing house from 1557 and succeeded him in 1570.

== Pictorum aliquot celebrium Germaniae inferioris effigies ==
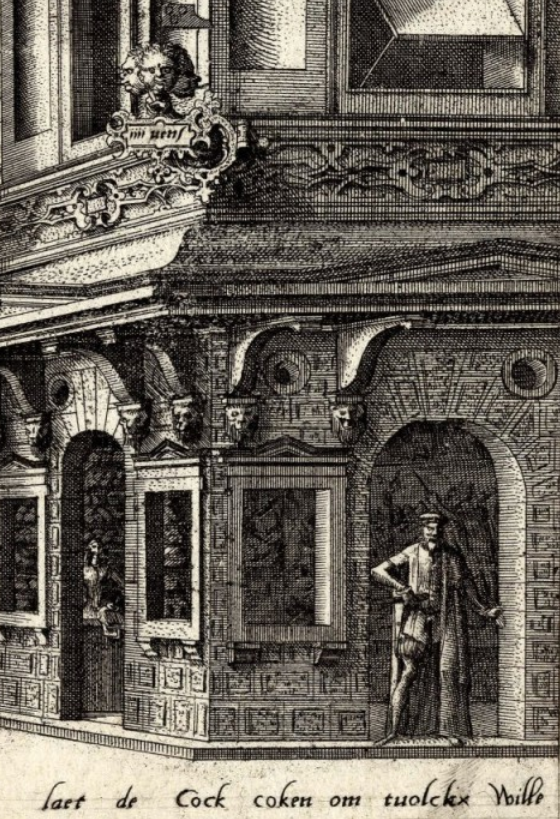
The Cock couple standing in the doorways of their workshop under the sign of "IIII vens" in a 1560 print

At his death in 1570 Cock left behind the most prominent print publishing establishment in Europe north of the Alps. His widow Volcxken continued the publishing house until her death in 1601. In 1572 she published a book by Dominicus Lampsonius called Pictorum aliquot celebrium Germaniae inferioris effigies (literal translation: Effigies of some celebrated painters of Lower Germany), a set of 23 engraved portraits of artists with short verses in Latin printed below them. Hieronymus Cock had been working on this publication at the time of his death. The quality of the 23 prints was outstanding as they had been made by some of the leading engravers of the time such as Johannes Wierix, Adriaen Collaert and Cornelis Cort.

The artists included in the book were (in the order in which they appear in the book): Hubert van Eyck, Jan van Eyck, Hieronymus Bosch, Rogier van der Weyden, Dirk Bouts, Bernard van Orley, Jan Mabuse, Joachim Patinir, Quentin Matsys, Lucas van Leyden, Jan van Amstel, Joos van Cleve, Matthys Cock, Herri met de Bles, Jan Cornelisz Vermeyen, Pieter Coecke van Aelst, Jan van Scorel, Lambert Lombard, Pieter Bruegel the Elder, Willem Key, Lucas Gassel, Frans Floris and ending with Hieronymus Cock. The book includes a poem by Lampsonius dedicated to the memory of Hieronymus Cock and applauding the work of his widow. The portraits and texts present an honour roll of the earlier generations of Netherlandish artists. Their publication thus contributed to the formation of a canon of famous Netherlandish painters, which was well underway even before Karel van Mander published in 1604 his biographies of early and contemporary Netherlandish artists in his Schilder-boeck.

The publisher Hendrik Hondius I published in 1610 a book with almost the same title ('Pictorum aliquot celebrium, præcipué Germaniæ Inferioris', in English: 'Effigies of some celebrated painters, chiefly of Lower Germany') that contained 69 engraved portraits of painters. Hondius' work included in its first part reworked versions of 22 of the portraits of the 1572 publication. The portrait of Hieronymus Cock (often numbered 23) was not included by Hondius maybe because the likeness was made after death, rather than drawn "ad vivum" (after the living model) as was the case for the other portraits.

== Collections ==
Cock's work is held in the permanent collections of many museums, including the Museum of New Zealand Te Papa Tongarewa, the British Museum, the Portland Art Museum, the University of Michigan Museum of Art, the Metropolitan Museum of Art, the Philadelphia Museum of Art, the Fralin Museum of Art, the Princeton University Art Museum, the Museum Boijmans Van Beuningen, the Saint Louis Art Museum, and the Michael C. Carlos Museum.
