= Jan van Amstel =

16th century Dutch painter

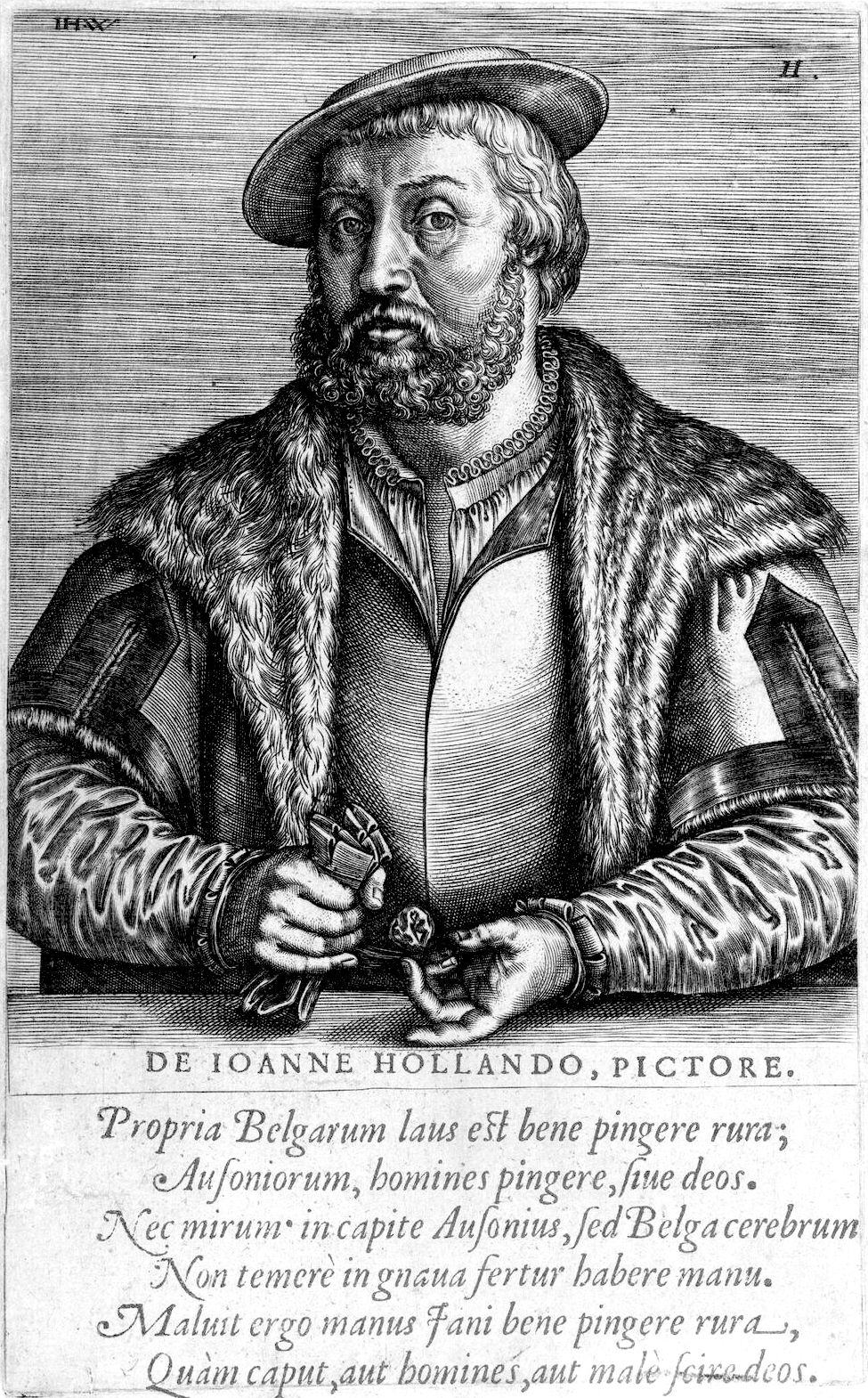
Jan van Amstel (Jan Wierix et Hieronymus Wierix, 1572)

Jan van Amstel, or Jan de Hollander, (c. 1500 – c. 1542) was a Dutch Northern Renaissance painter.

Jan van Amstel was born in Amsterdam. In or before 1528, van Amstel moved to Antwerp; in that year he joined the city's Guild of Saint Luke. He married Adriane van Doornicke, who would after his death remarry and give birth in 1544 to the future painter Gillis van Coninxloo. He is also probably the older brother of Pieter Aertsen and the brother-in-law of Pieter Coecke van Aelst. He died in Antwerp.

Van Amstel is possibly identical to The Brunswick Monogrammist, for the signature J. V. AMSL appears on the latter's The Feeding of the Poor or Feeding of the Five Thousand.

== See also ==
- Flemish painting
- List of Dutch painters
