= Wierix family =

Flemish family of artists

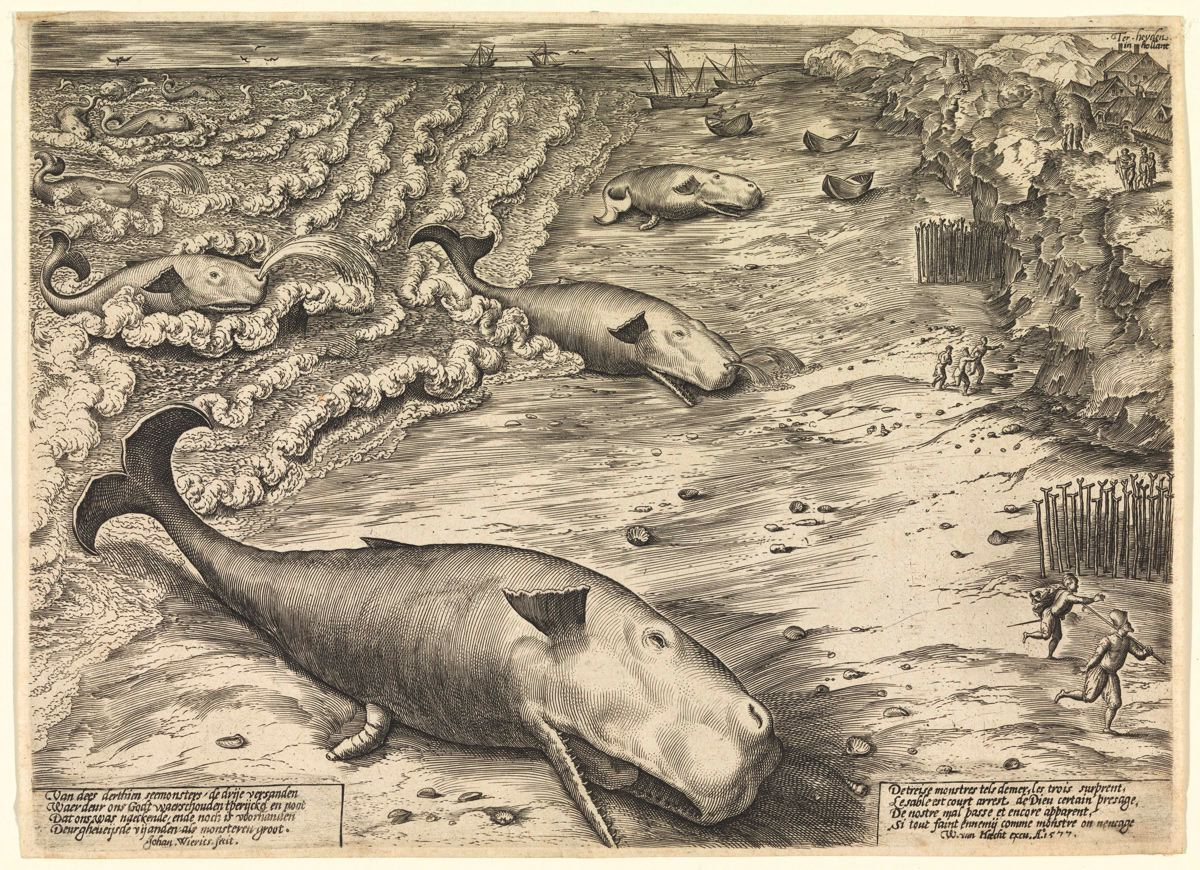
Three Beached Whales, by Johannes Wierix

The Wierix family, sometimes seen in alternative spellings such as Wiericx, were a Flemish family of artists who distinguished themselves as printmakers and draughtsmen in the late 16th and early 17th centuries. They were active in Antwerp and Brussels.

The first generation of engravers consisted of the three sons of the little-known painter and cabinet maker Anton Wierix I :

- Johannes Wierix (also called 'Jan' or 'Hans') Wierix (1549 – c.1618),
- Hieronymus Wierix (1553–1619),
- Anton II (or Anthony II) Wierix (c.1552 – c.1604).

Anton II's son, Anton III Wierix (1596–1624), completes the engraver members of the family, although his early death prevented him from producing a large oeuvre. All were highly productive, with 2,333 prints catalogued between them, the largest number by Johannes. The Wierix family members were known for their attention to detail and superb technique.

== Lives ==
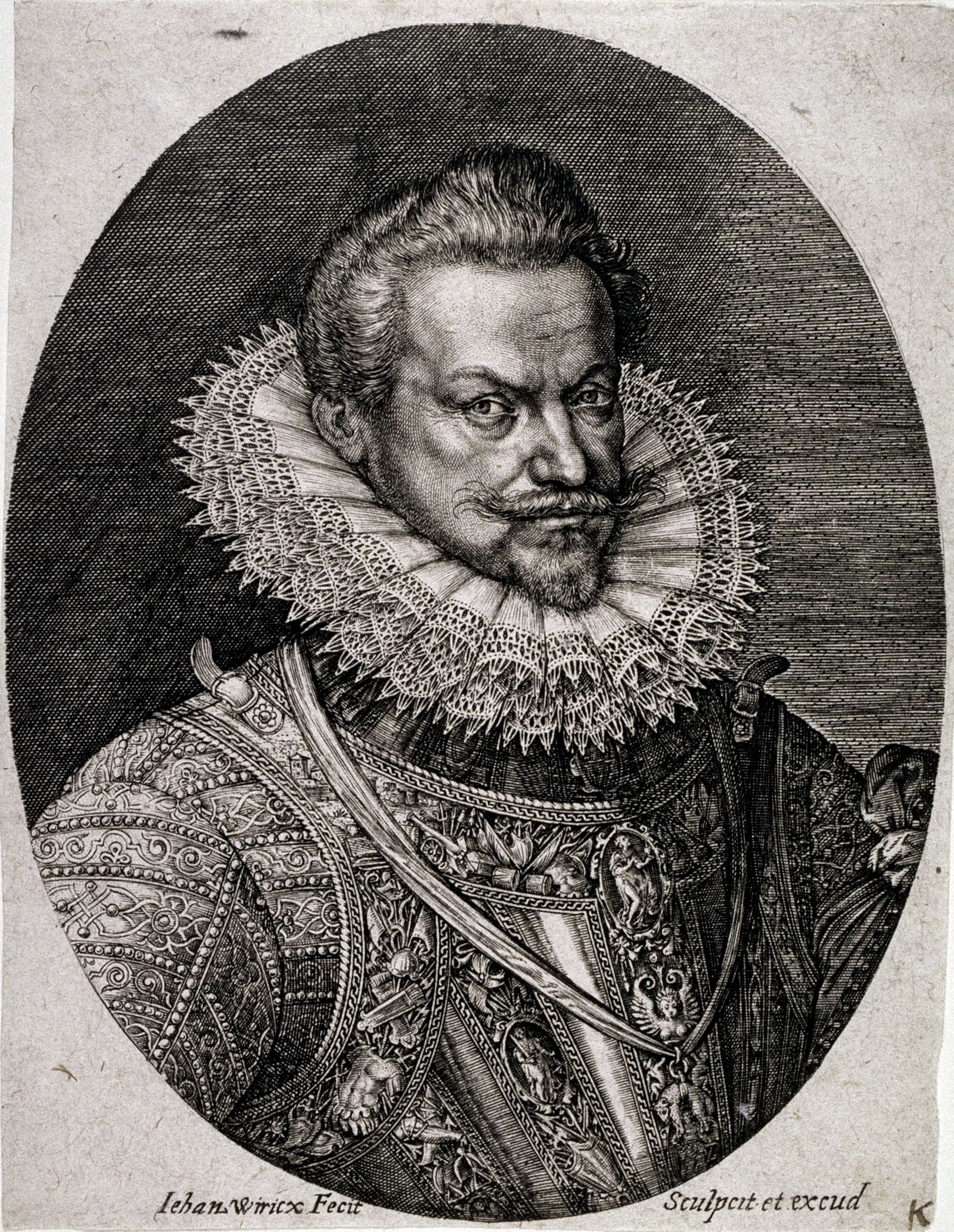
Philip William of Orange, by Johannes Wierix

Johannes and Hieronymus appear to have begun training together, and although Hieronymus was the younger by four years, he was able to keep pace with his brother. Even for that period, they were precocious, with very fine copies of other prints dated from the age of 12 in Hieronymus's case, and 14 in Johannes' (as apprentices, they were not supposed to sign work, but added their ages and a date). Their copies of engravings by Albrecht Dürer from this period are still valued by collectors. Who their master was is unknown – it was unlikely to be their father, who had joined the Antwerp artists' Guild of Saint Luke in 1545/6 but is also recorded as a cabinetmaker. Johannes and Hieronymus first worked producing book illustrations for the large publishing concern of Christopher Plantin in Antwerp. Hieronymus was first paid by Plantin in 1570, and they both joined the Antwerp artists' Guild of Saint Luke in 1572/3.

Johannes probably trained Anton II, Hieronymus, and Anton III. The brothers often worked together, but Johannes moved to Delft from 1577–79, probably as a result of the Sack of Antwerp in 1576, also known as the Spanish Fury. He then returned to Antwerp for nearly 20 years – perhaps his best period – and moved briefly to The Hague before settling in Brussels at about the turn of the century, where he remained until his death.

The brothers were recorded as Lutherans in 1585, but as they later did a large amount of work for the Jesuits, it seems probable they converted or reconverted to Catholicism after this date.

All three, but especially Hieronymus, were described by contemporaries as leading disorderly lives, and had long criminal records, mostly for drunkenness and the like, but Hieronymus spent several months in prison in 1579-80 for an accidentally fatal drunken assault on a female tavernkeeper. They may have been let go by Plantin for this reason, and a famous letter from him complained that they only worked for a few days to raise enough money to disappear into the taverns, where he would have to seek them out, pay their bills, and get their tools out of pawn. However, the productivity and quality of their work gives a rather different picture. As they grew older, they led more regular lives, all marrying with several children, and probably all running workshops with assistants – the portraitist Michiel Jansz van Mierevelt began his training with Hieronymus, although he soon moved to another master. The father of Samuel Dirksz van Hoogstraten was another pupil of Hieronymus. Johannes' pupils included Hendrik Hondius I (1573 – c. 1650). After Anton II died relatively young in 1604, Hieronymus took over his plates and his young son Anton III. Anton III's death at an even younger age brought an end to the family business, although at least one of the brothers' many daughters married an engraver.

== Work ==
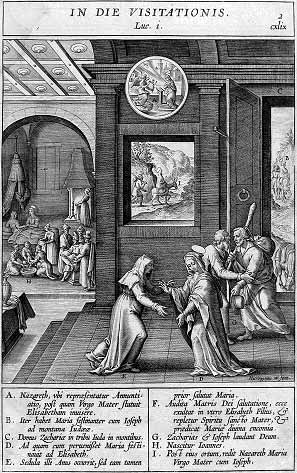
Scenes from the Life of the Virgin from the Adnotationes illustrations, 1593. Nativity of Mary left rear, Meeting of Mary and Elizabeth, foreground.

The brothers all worked for a number of publishers, but also published their own prints, in total nearly half their output: Hieronymus published about 650 prints himself, Johannes 325 and Anton II 125. Johannes did more work for Plantin than Hieronymus, amounting to over 120 plates by 1576. Most of their work was based on compositions by another artist, whether a painting, drawing or print. In ambitious original compositions, the brothers could not match the work of their contemporary Hendrik Goltzius and other Dutch engravers, and they produced few works of this sort.

Their association with the Jesuits began with the illustrations for the Adnotationes et Meditationes in Evangelia, a project initiated by the order's founder, St. Ignatius Loyola before his death in 1556. He had asked the literary Jesuit Jerome Nadal to prepare the text, and 154 drawings had been produced by various artists, mostly Italian. Plantin had agreed to publish the work, but with the disruption of the Spanish Fury of 1576, had not done so by his death. After attempting to find engravers elsewhere, the Jesuits, in the person of Fr Ferdinand Ximenez (recipient of the famous character reference for the brothers mentioned above), took the brothers on. The prints were finally published in a separate volume from the text in 1593, the Evangelicae Historiae Imagines ("Pictures of the Gospel Stories") and were still being reprinted in the 18th century. They were intended as models of faithful depictions of the incidents of the Gospels, and partly as a Counter Reformation riposte to Protestant criticisms of Catholic iconographical tradition. The apparent setting of most interior scenes in a wealthy Antwerp merchant's house does not contribute to the desired effect in modern eyes. Among copies was a version made by Jesuit missionaries in China in woodblock print form, and editions presented to the Emperors of Ethiopia had a considerable influence on the iconography of local artists. Further work for the Jesuits followed. Hieronymus in particular came to specialize in small religious scenes.

Apart from religious works the Wierixs became "the leading purveyors of small-scale printed portraits in the Netherlands", although only Johannes appears to have made drawings from the life, and most of his portraits are copied from paintings, drawings or prints by others (very often of international figures). Some of Johannes' drawings were made to be engraved, but others were sold as finished objects. The British Museum has 44, including 19 illustrating the Book of Genesis, and a large composition of Diana surprised by Actaeon. Most are on vellum.
