= Johannes Livineius =

- Lievens
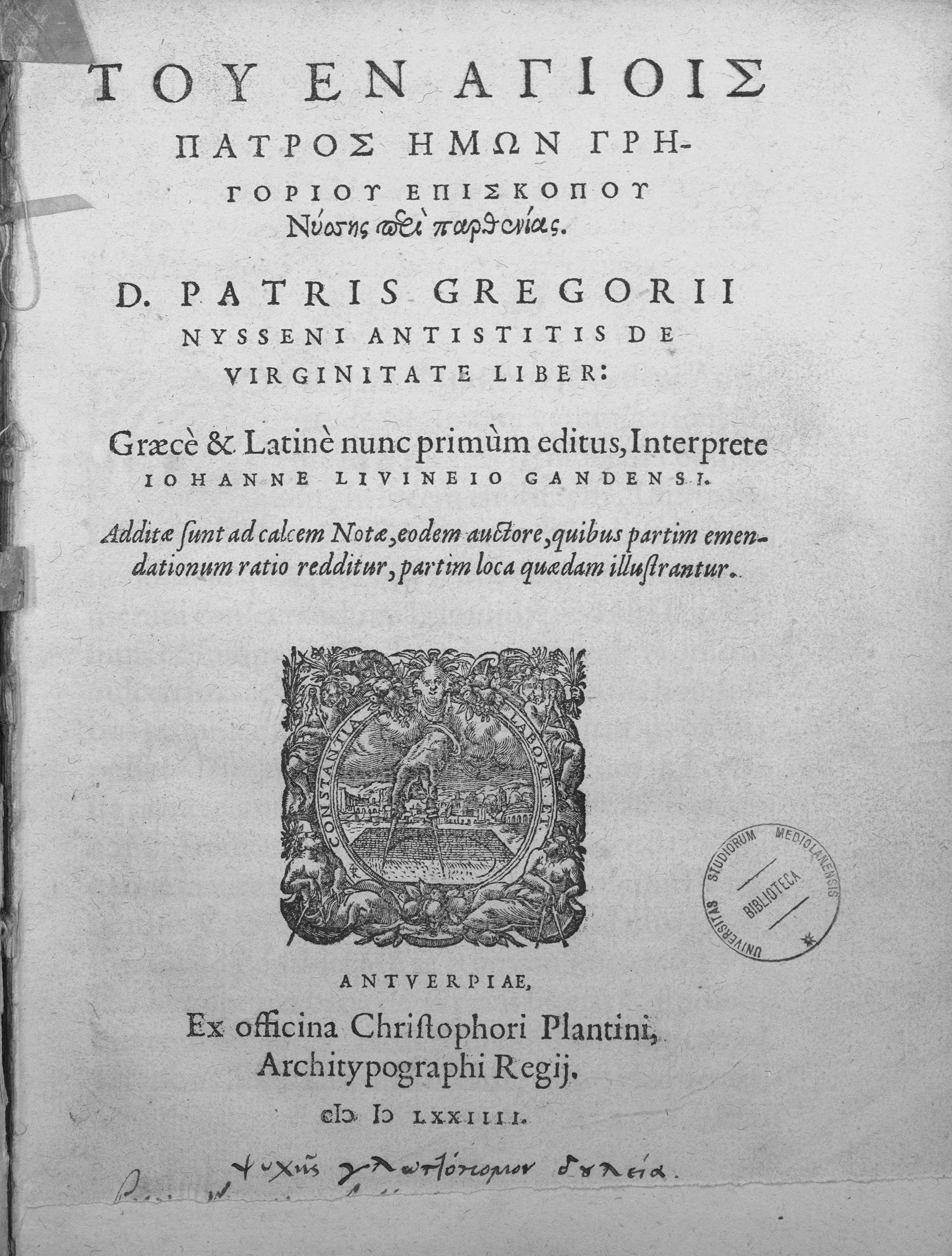
- The title page of Livineius's edition and translation of Gregory of Nyssa on Virginity (1574)
- Born: 1546 or 1547; Dendermonde, County of Flanders, Habsburg Netherlands
- Died: 13 January 1599; Antwerp, Duchy of Brabant, Spanish Netherlands
- Resting place: Antwerp Cathedral
- Education: University of Leuven
- Relatives: Laevinus Torrentius (uncle)
- Writing career
- Language: Latin
- Period: Renaissance
- Subject: Greek patristics

Johannes Lievens, Latinized Johannes Livineius (1546/47–1599), was a scholar of Greek patristics from the Habsburg Netherlands (now Belgium).

== Life ==
Lievens was born in Dendermonde (County of Flanders) in 1546 or 1547, the son of Nicolas Lievens and Clara Vander Beke (sister to Laevinus Torrentius). Although not born in Ghent, he sometimes used the cognomen Gandensis, as both his parents were from that city. He was educated first in Ghent and later at the Jesuit college in Cologne, before attending the University of Leuven.

On 16 July 1573 he was awarded a canonry at St Peter's Church, Liège, exchanging it for one at Antwerp Cathedral in 1588. He died of an apoplexy in Antwerp on 13 January 1599, aged 51, and was buried in Antwerp Cathedral.

== Works ==
Livineius's Latin translation and critical Greek edition of Gregory of Nyssa's treatise on Virginity, with a dedication to Antonio Carafa, was published at Antwerp by Christopher Plantin in 1574. The following year, Plantin printed Livineius's translation of John Chrysostom's treatise on Virginity.

Livineius also produced an edition of twelve Latin panegyricists (XII panegyrici veteres, Plantin Office, 1599), from a manuscript in the Abbey of Saint Bertin (Saint-Omer).

His translation of Theodore the Studite's catechetical sermons (Antwerp, Bellerus, 1602) was prepared for posthumous publication by Aubertus Miraeus.
