= Hieronymus Wierix =

Flemish engraver (1553–1619)

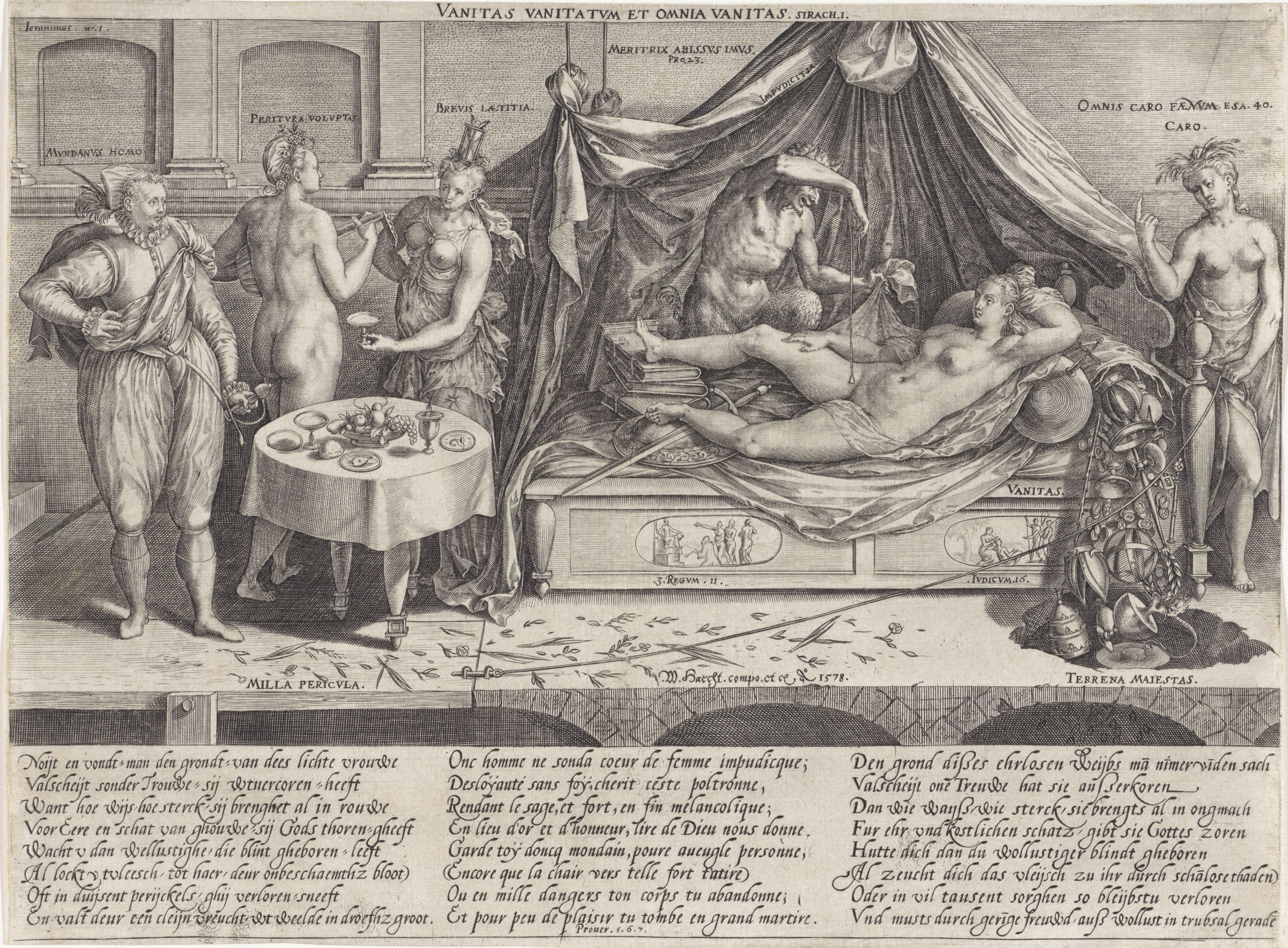
The seduction of man from the series on the fall and salvation of man, with text by Willem van Haecht

Hieronymus Wierix (1553–1619) was a Flemish engraver, draughtsman and publisher. He is known for his reproductive engravings after the work of well-known local and foreign artists including Albrecht Dürer. Together with other members of the Wierix family of engravers he played an important role in spreading appreciation for Netherlandish art abroad. He also created works that supported at various times the Protestant or Catholic causes in the Southern Netherlands.

== Life ==
Hieronymus Wierix was born in Antwerp as the son of Anton Wierix I (c. 1520/25–c. 1572). His father Anton was registered in the Guild of St. Luke in Antwerp as a painter in the Guild year 1545–6 but is occasionally also referred to as a cabinet maker. It is not believed that Anton I taught Hieronymus or his other two sons Johannes and Anton II. Hieronymus and Johannes are believed to have trained with a goldsmith while Anton II likely trained with an older brother, probably Johannes. After his father's death Hieronymus was placed under the guardianship of Sanson Catsopyn and Jheronimus Mannacker.

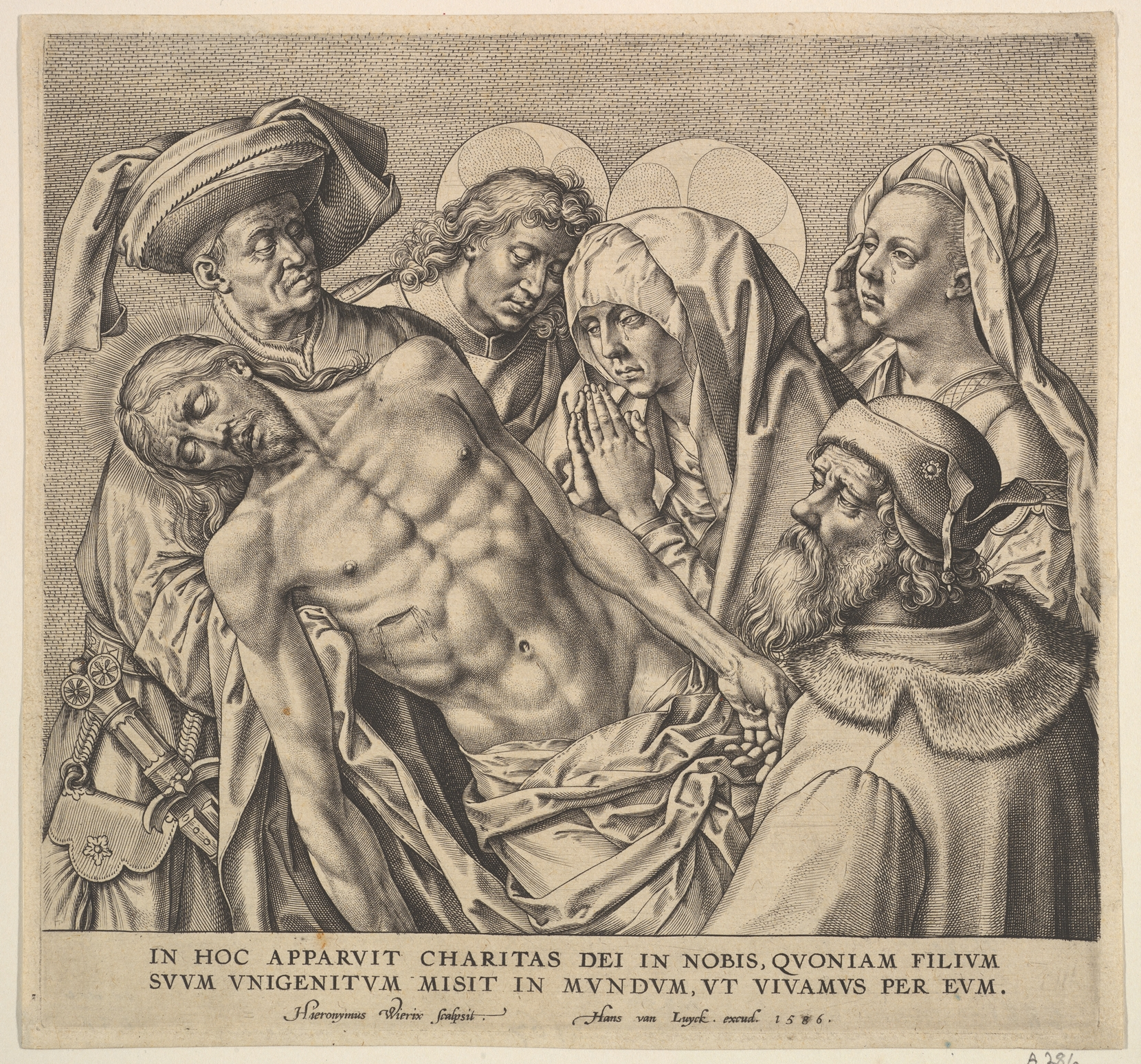
Bearing the Body of Christ

Hieronymus was deemed a child prodigy as he started to engrave in 1565 at age 11 and produced excellent copies after Dürer a year later. He worked only briefly for the Plantin Press in Antwerp, realizing about 10 engravings in the period 1569—1571. He was admitted as a 'wijnmeester' (son of a master) in the Guild of St. Luke in Antwerp in the guild year 1572-1573. His first engraving as independent master dates back to 1577. During the period of 1577–1580, he made a lot of prints for Willem van Haecht the Elder and Godevaard van Haecht. These works of him were mainly allegorical and political and reflected his sympathy for those who rebelled against the Spanish suppression of non-Catholic creeds. Like his brother Jan, he regularly made reproductions after designs by Maerten de Vos and other Flemish designers, such as Johannes Stradanus and Chrispijn van den Broeck. He also made many small devotional prints. His works were further published by other Antwerp publishers such as Philips Galle, Hans van Luyck, Gerard de Jode and Jan Baptist Vrints.

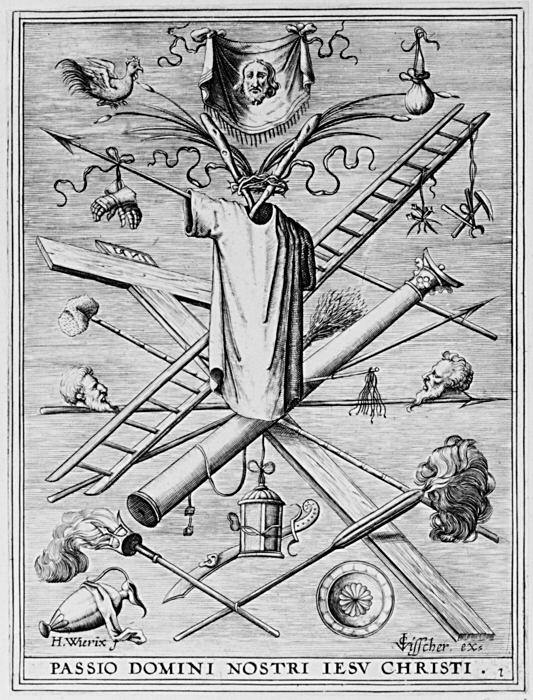
Christ's Robe Surrounded by the Instruments of the Passion

Listed as Lutherans at the time of the Fall of Antwerp in 1585, the family members seem to have reconverted to Catholicism soon thereafter. The three Wierix brothers gained a reputation for their disorderly conduct as evidenced by a 1587 letter by prominent publisher Christophe Plantin to the Jesuit priest Ferdinand Ximenes in which he complained that whoever wanted to employ the Wierix brothers had to look for them in the taverns, pay their debts and fines and recover their tools, since they would have pawned them. Plantin also wrote that after having worked for a few days the brothers would return to the tavern. During one of his drinking bouts he injured the head of a certain Clara van Hove who died from her injuries. He spent about two years in jail as a result.

His apprentices were Abraham van Merlen, Jan Baptist van den Sande the elder, and Jacob de Weert. His daughter Christina married the engraver Jan Baptist Barbé, who later had his other daughter Cecilia (his sister-in-law) declared insane in order to claim her inheritance, which included a set of Dürer drawings owned by her father.

== Work ==
Wierix is mostly known for his reproductive engravings after the work of well-known local and foreign artists including Albrecht Dürer and delicate religious prints on a very small scale. In comparison to his brothers Jan and Anton II, he was the more prolific publisher of his own prints, ultimately publishing about 650 in total, compared to Anton's 235 and Jan's 125.

== Selected works ==
Museum Boijmans Van Beuningen

- The Decision to Grow Wheat in a Forest Area for More Profit, c. 1575 – 1585.
- Portrait of Volcxken Dierckx, 1579
- Saint Ambrose, 1586
- Conservat cuncta Cupido, 1600
- Portrait of Catherine-Henriette de Balzac Dentraigues, Marquise de Verneuil, 1600

National Gallery of Art, Washington

- Fasciculus myrrhae dilectus meus mihi
- Dum pierulo fugendum ...
- O quam tristis et afflicta ..
- S. Lydtwina Virgo Schiedamensis ...
