= Volcxken Diericx =

Flemish print maker

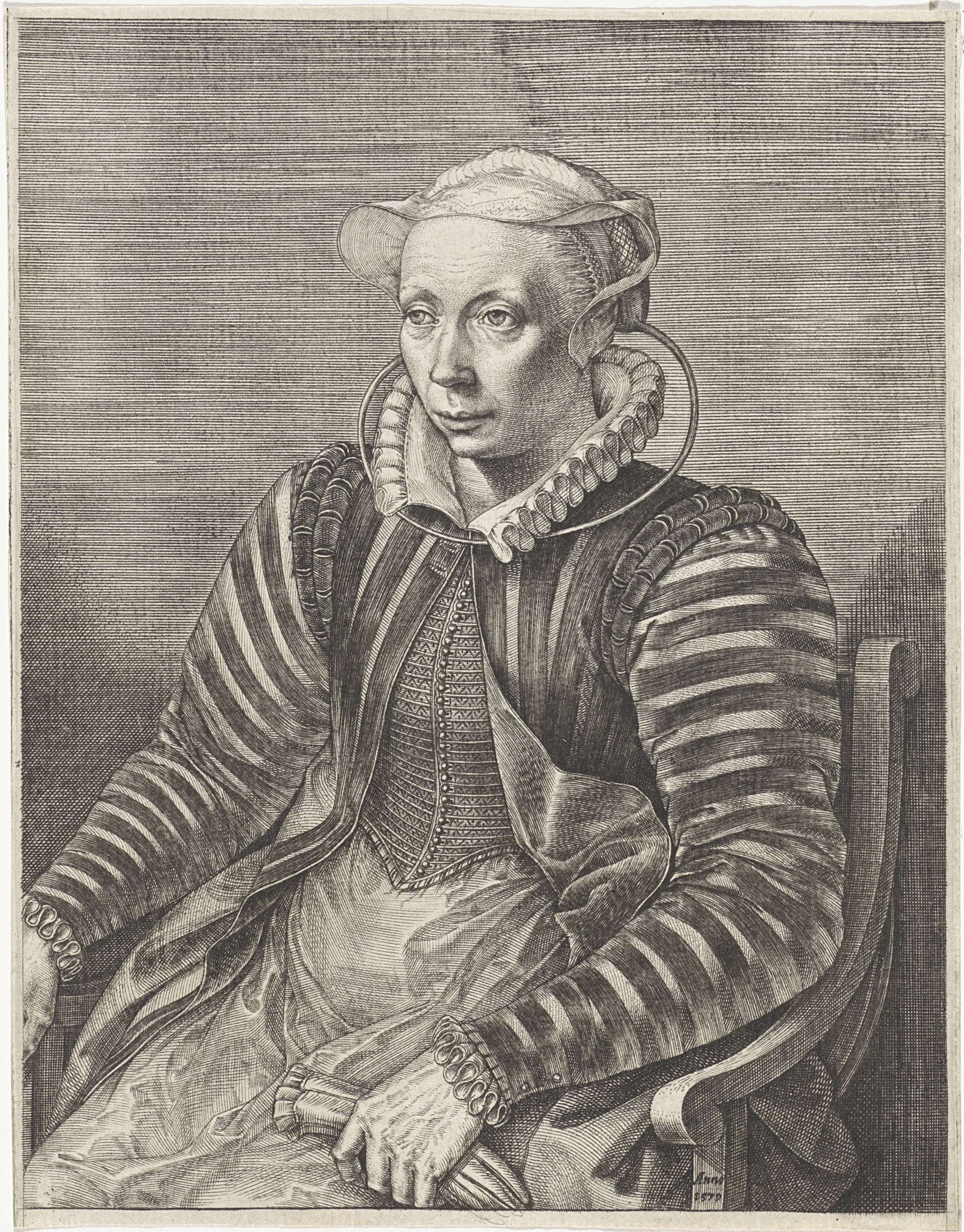
- Volcxken Diericx by Johannes Wierix
- Born: c.1525
- Died: 23 December 1600, Antwerp

Volcxken Diericx (c. 1525 – 1600) was a Flemish print maker and publisher. She and her husband Hieronymus Cock founded an important publishing house in Antwerp, which she continued to operate after the death of her husband.

== Biography ==
She was probably from Antwerp like her husband Hieronymus Cock. Together they founded the publishing house Aux Quatre Vents (The Four Winds), for which they received a patent on 11 January 1548. Their shop was located near the Stock Exchange in Antwerp, on the corner of Lange Nieuwstraat and Katelijnevest. They later moved near to the tapestry exchange called Tapissierspand.

On a print by Johannes van Deutecum from 1560, the couple is portrayed in their shop (the rest of the building and street is from an architectural fantasy by Hans Vredeman de Vries). The print has two inscriptions, "IIII vens" (i.e. Quatre Vents) and a pun based on the meanings in Dutch of their respective names, i.e. 'Cock' means 'a cook' and 'Volckx' means 'the people': "Laet de Cock coken om tvolckx wille" which literally translates as 'let Cock cook what his Volcxken wants' (a reference to his wife's important role) but also refers to the fact that their publishing house published what the market (the people) wanted.

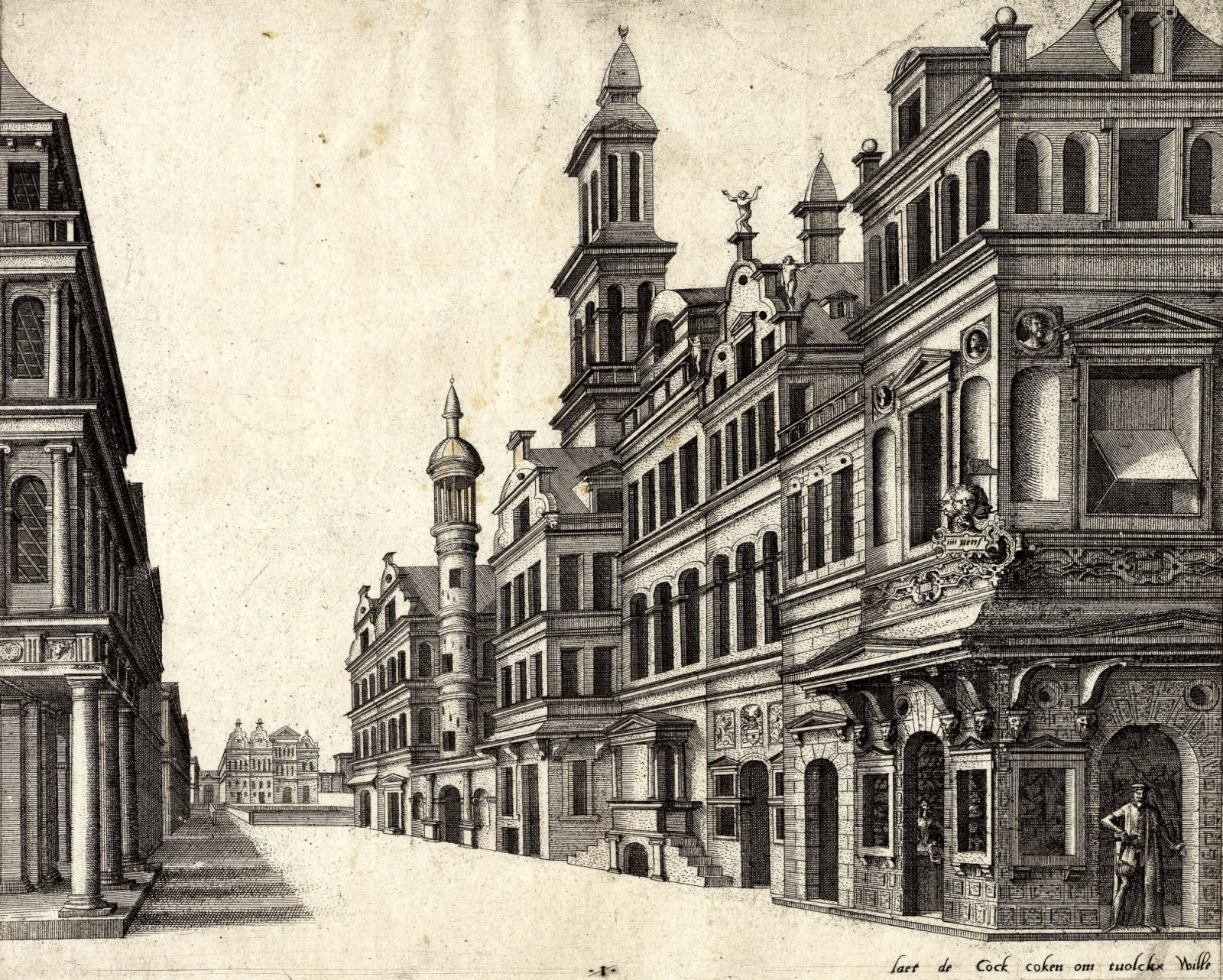
Aux Quatre Vents in a 1560 print

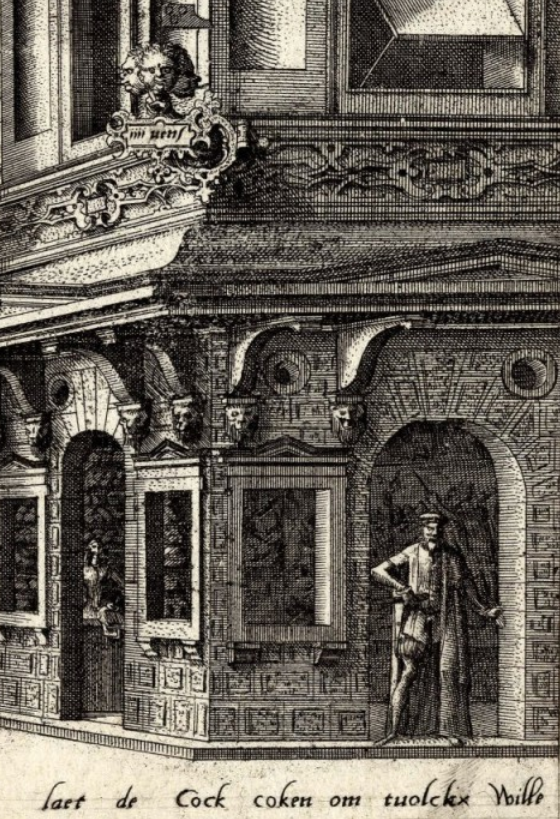
Detail

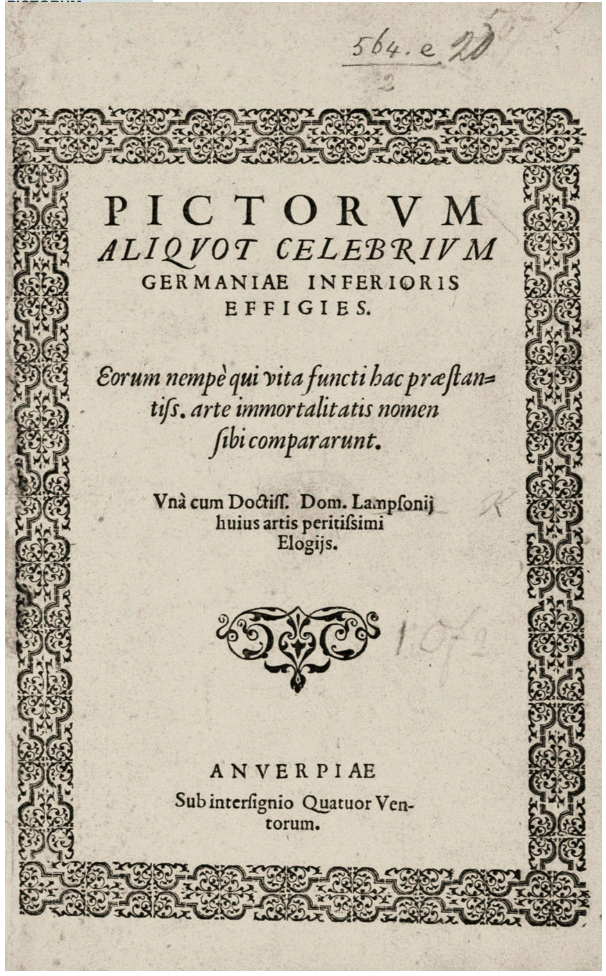
Title page of Pictorum aliquot celebrium Germaniae inferioris effigies by Dominicus Lampsonius, published in Antwerp in 1572 under the Aux Quatre Vents imprint

Aux Quatre Vents became a prestigious publishing house that published about 2,000 prints during its half century of existence. Cock and Diericx specialized in high quality etchings and engravings, made by the best European specialists, offered a wide variety in subject selection, and exported to all corners of the world. From 1551 until Cock's death, the couple employed the engravers Pieter Breugel the Elder, Lucas and Joannes van Deutecum, Giorgio Ghisi, Cornelis Cort, Philips Galle, Maarten van Heemskerck, Lambert Lombard, Hans Vredeman de Vries, Michiel Coxcie and Frans Floris. Diericx is known for republishing these works as well as contracting Hendrik Goltzius during his first few years in Haarlem (1577–1582).

After the death of her husband in 1570 all the prints published by their publishing house carried the sentence Aux Quatre Vents without the name of her husband Cock. She remarried and she and her second husband Lambrecht Bottin are mentioned along with Christophe Plantin at the top of a list of print makers and print sellers in Antwerp, which was compiled between 1577 and 1580.

Diericx died in Antwerp and left over 1,600 copper plates and a large inventory of prints in her estate.
