= Johannes Wierix =

Flemish engraver (1549–c. 1620)

- Annunciation, Amsterdam, Rijksmuseum
- Born: 1549; Antwerp, Habsburg Netherlands
- Died: c. 1620; Brussels, Spanish Netherlands
- Known for: Engraver, draughtsman and publisher
- Movement: Renaissance

Johannes Wierix (1549 – c. 1620) was a Flemish engraver, draughtsman and publisher. He was a very accomplished engraver who made prints after his own designs as well as designs by local and foreign artists. He further made engravings on silver and ivory.

Together with other members of the Wierix family of engravers he played an important role in spreading appreciation for Netherlandish art abroad as well as in creating art that supported the Catholic cause in the Southern Netherlands. Johannes Wierix is also known for his miniature pen drawings.

== Life ==
He was born in Antwerp as the son of Anton Wierix I (c. 1520/25 – c. 1572). His father Anton was registered as a painter in 1545–6 but is occasionally also referred to as a cabinet maker. It is not believed that Anton I taught Johannes or his other two sons Hieronymous and Anton II. Johannes and Hieronymus are believed to have trained with a goldsmith while Anton II likely trained with an older brother, probably Johannes. Listed as Lutherans at the time of the Fall of Antwerp in 1585, the family members seem to have reconverted to Catholicism soon thereafter.

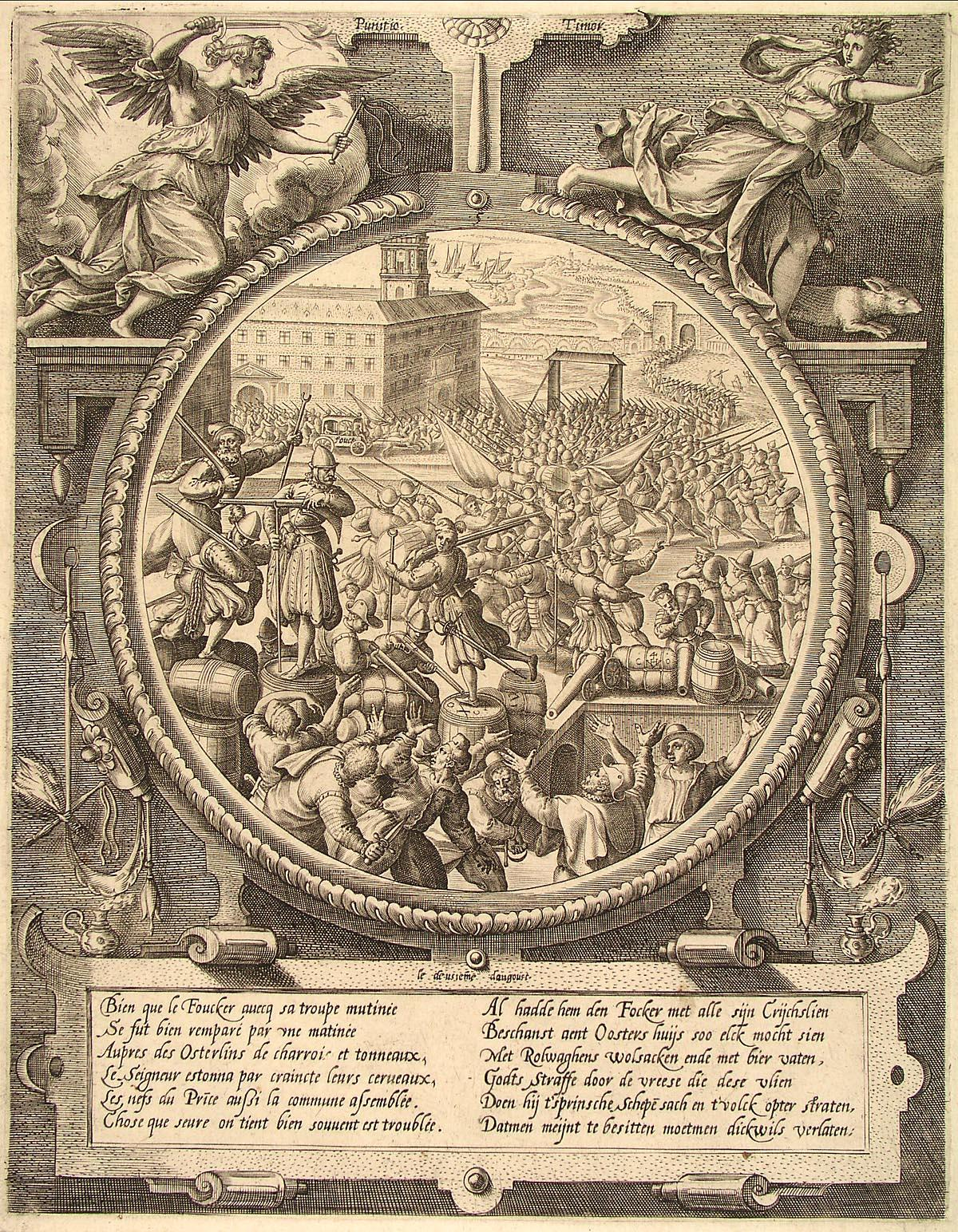
Retreat of the Germans

In his early career Johannes was active in Antwerp as an engraver, initially working as a reproductive artist after works by Dürer and other artists. He became employed by the prominent publisher Christophe Plantin in 1569. The three Wierix brothers gained a reputation for their disorderly conduct as evidenced by a 1587 letter by Plantin to the Jesuit priest Ferdinand Ximenes in which he complained that whoever wanted to employ the Wierix brothers had to look for them in the taverns, pay their debts and fines and recover their tools, since they would have pawned them. Plantin also wrote that after having worked for a few days the brothers would return to the tavern. Plantin regularly had to repay Johannes' debts. Johannes became a master engraver registered in the Antwerp Guild of Saint Luke in 1572–1573.

After marrying Elisabeth Bloemsteen in 1576 he soon left her and was recorded in Delft from 1577 to 1579. His famous engraving of beached whales on the beach of Ter Heyde was made by him in 1577. He also received commissions to produce small oval portraits of prominent citizens of Delft. Upon returning to Antwerp in 1579, Johannes Wierix worked not only for Plantin, but also for other publishers such as Hans Liefrinck, Jan-Baptist Vrients, Phillip Galle, Gerard de Jode, Willem van Haecht, Godevaard van Haecht and Hieronymous Cock's widow Volcxken Dierix who continued the publishing business after her husband's death. In addition, he occasionally published his own engravings himself. Johannes Wierix was so much in demand that he could exact such a high price for his work that Plantin was not always able or willing to engage him for a publication project.

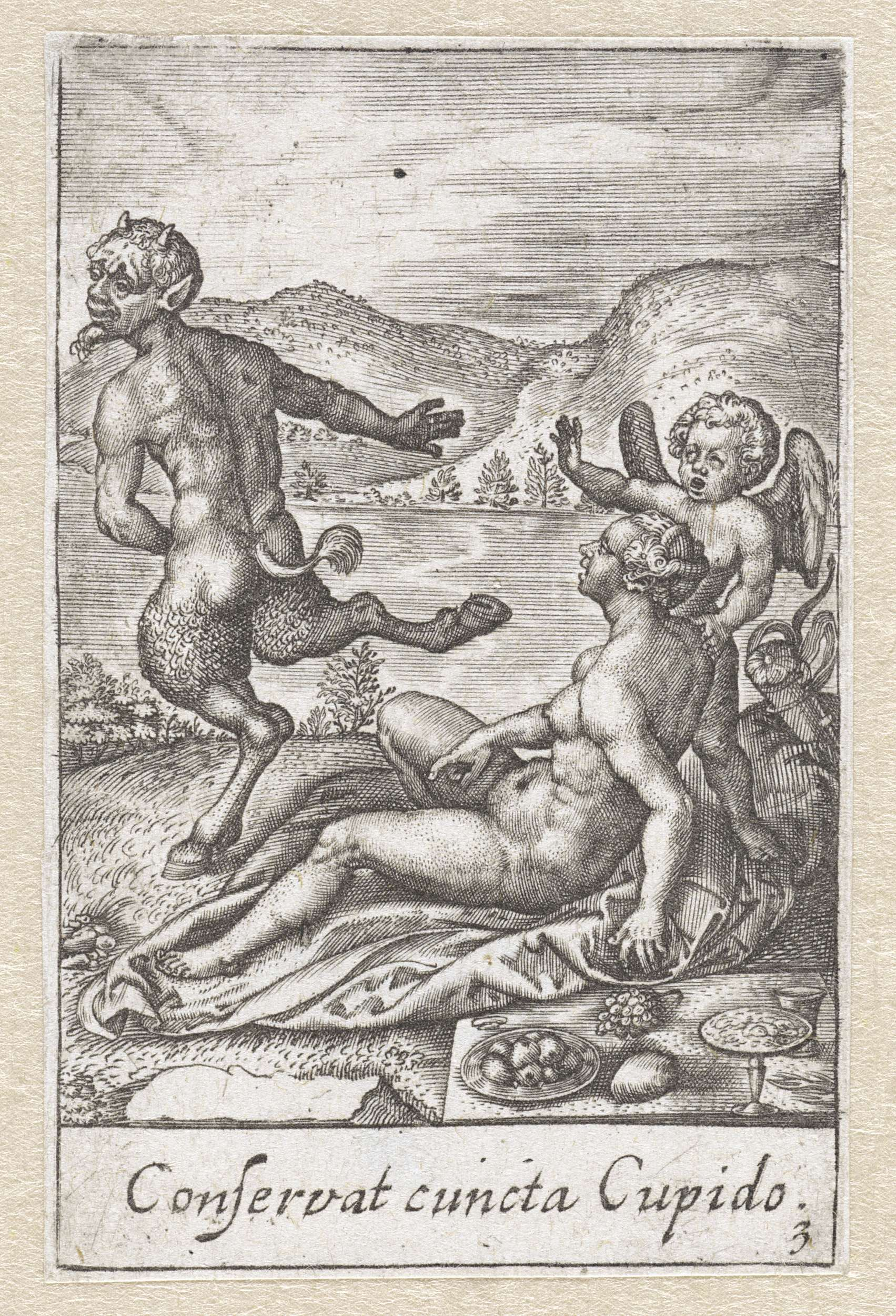
Triumph of virtue over lust

Johannes Wierix is last documented in Antwerp in 1594. He is subsequently recorded as living in Brussels where he was employed by the Brussels court of Archduke Ernest of Austria. He may already have moved to Brussels by 1601 as on 28 July of that year he failed to appear in Antwerp in the settlement of a deal involving family property. There is a firm record for his residency in Brussels in 1612.

He died in Brussels.

== Work ==
=== General ===
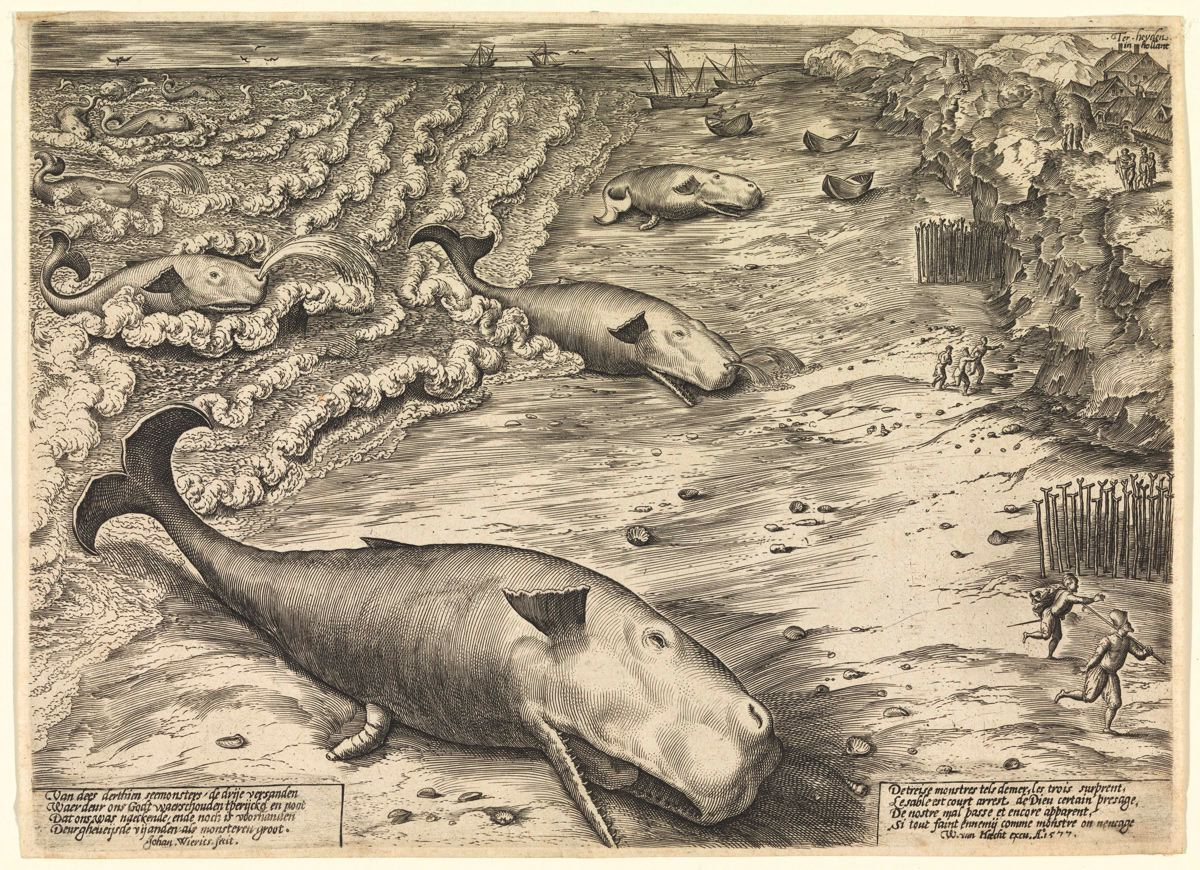
Three beached whales, 1577

Despite his reputation for leading a dissolute life style, Johannes Wierix was a prolific artist who created a number of designs, drawings, engravings for prints and engravings on silver and ivory. Some engravings of Johannes have been misattributed to his brother Hieronymous because he signed some of his works with the monogram IHW or HW, in which the H stands for one of the short forms of his name, i.e. Hans.

=== Graphic work ===
Wierix worked on some of the important publications of the late 16th century. This includes a commission by the Jesuits and other militant Counter-Reformation orders on Catholic materials. His prints played an important propagandistic role in the Catholic Church's recovery of the southern Netherlands. Another important publication he worked on was the set of 23 engraved portraits of artists from the Low Countries authored by Dominicus Lampsonius and published in 1572 under the title Pictorum aliquot celebrium Germaniae inferioris effigies (literal translation: Effigies of some celebrated painters of Lower Germany).

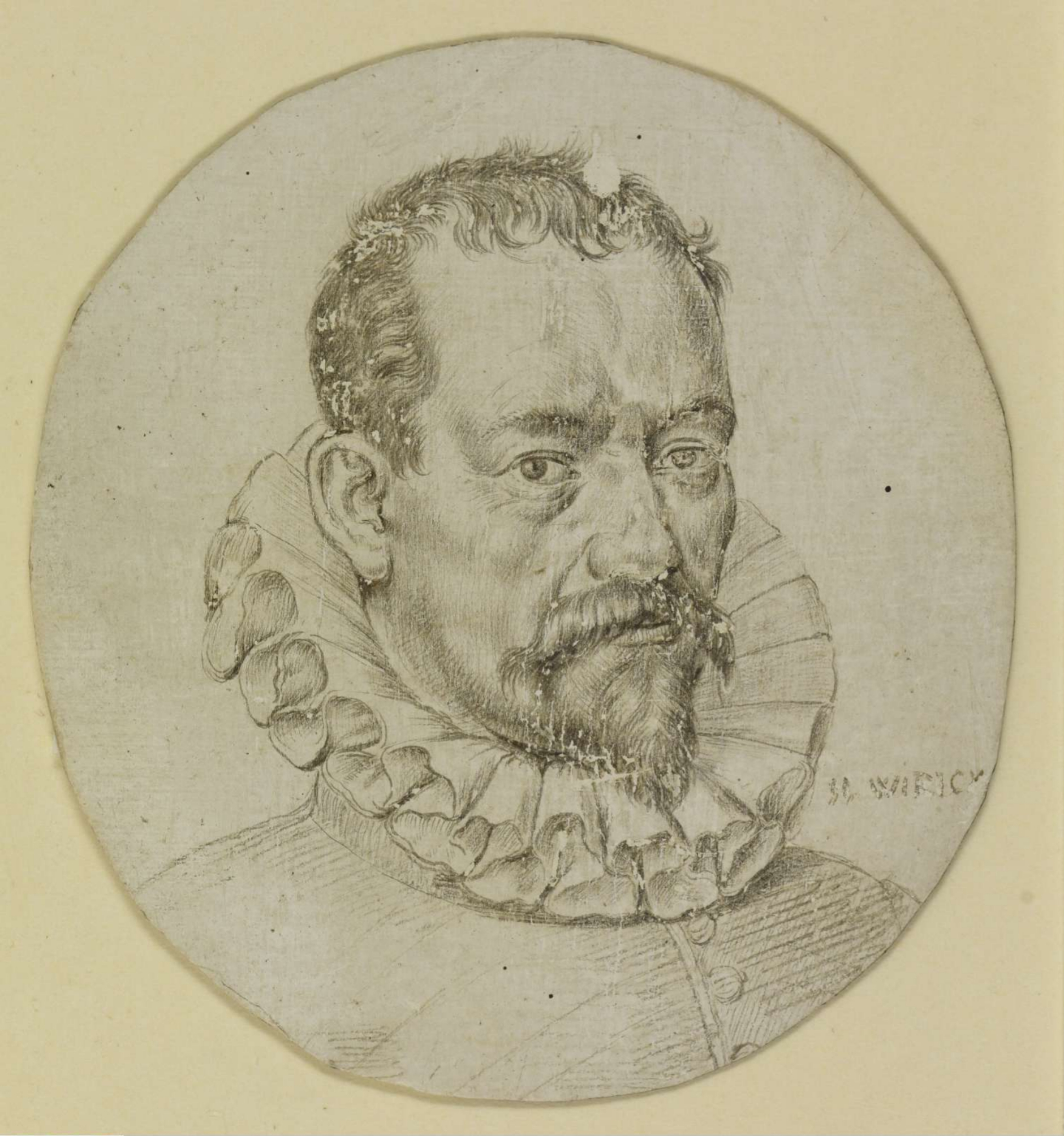
Portrait of Hieronymus Beck

Besides inventing his own compositions, Wierix engraved the designs of Frans Floris, Gillis Mostaert and Crispin van den Broeck. Maerten de Vos who was one of the most prolific artists in Flanders in the second half of the 16th century, collaborated frequently with Wierix and made designs specially to be engraved by Wierix.

=== Drawings ===
Johannes Wierix was a prolific draughtsman and about 250 drawings signed by or attributed to Wierix are preserved. His drawings are usually kept in albums or as loose leaves. His drawings include various biblical series, of which three sets of scenes from Genesis and five Passion cycles. His drawings were collected and admired in his time for their virtuoso displays of intricate detail and delicate craftsmanship.

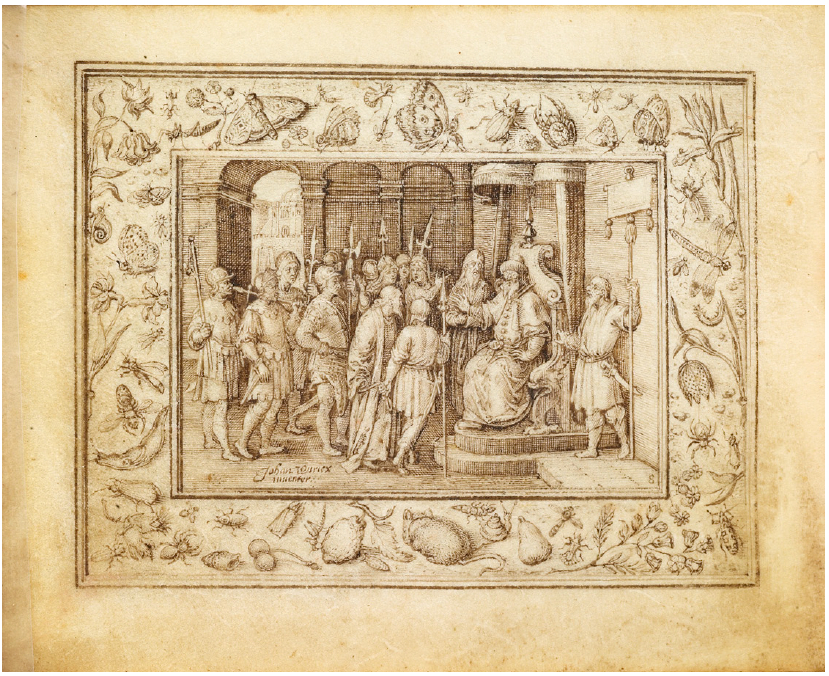
Christ before Pilate, from Passion Cycle

He occasionally worked in silverpoint. The only signed silverpoint drawing by his hand is a portrait of Hieronymus Beck (Herzog Anton Ulrich-Museum, Braunschweig) and is a study in reverse for his engraving of the same subject. It is possible that he used the silverpoint frequently for the design of his engravings.

During his residence in Brussels Johannes made miniature pen drawings, which are signed and dated mostly around 1607–1608. These drawings are executed in a meticulous technique, using dots and minute crosshatching as an engraver would.

The Walters Art Museum collection holds a volume of 16 bound-together parchment leaves depicting a Passion cycle in miniature drawings (the volume is known as w.722, fol. 6r). The volume is very small in size measuring only 83 mm by 103 mm and is in landscape format. Framed blank spaces on the recto of each leaf appear to be spaces for text, perhaps to be added later by a scribe or subsequent owner as one would see in contemporary emblem books such as the Humanae salutis monumenta of Benito Arias Montanus, for which Wierix cut some of the plates. Wierix used these miniature drawings to show off his technical prowess. This is particularly evident in the margins, which are filled with precisely drawn acanthus scrolls, devices, and naturalistic renderings of flowers, insects and small animals. Many of these items were clearly copied from the Archetypa studiaque patris, the volume of engravings made by Jacob Hoefnagel after drawings by his father Joris Hoefnagel.

=== Engravings on silver and ivory ===
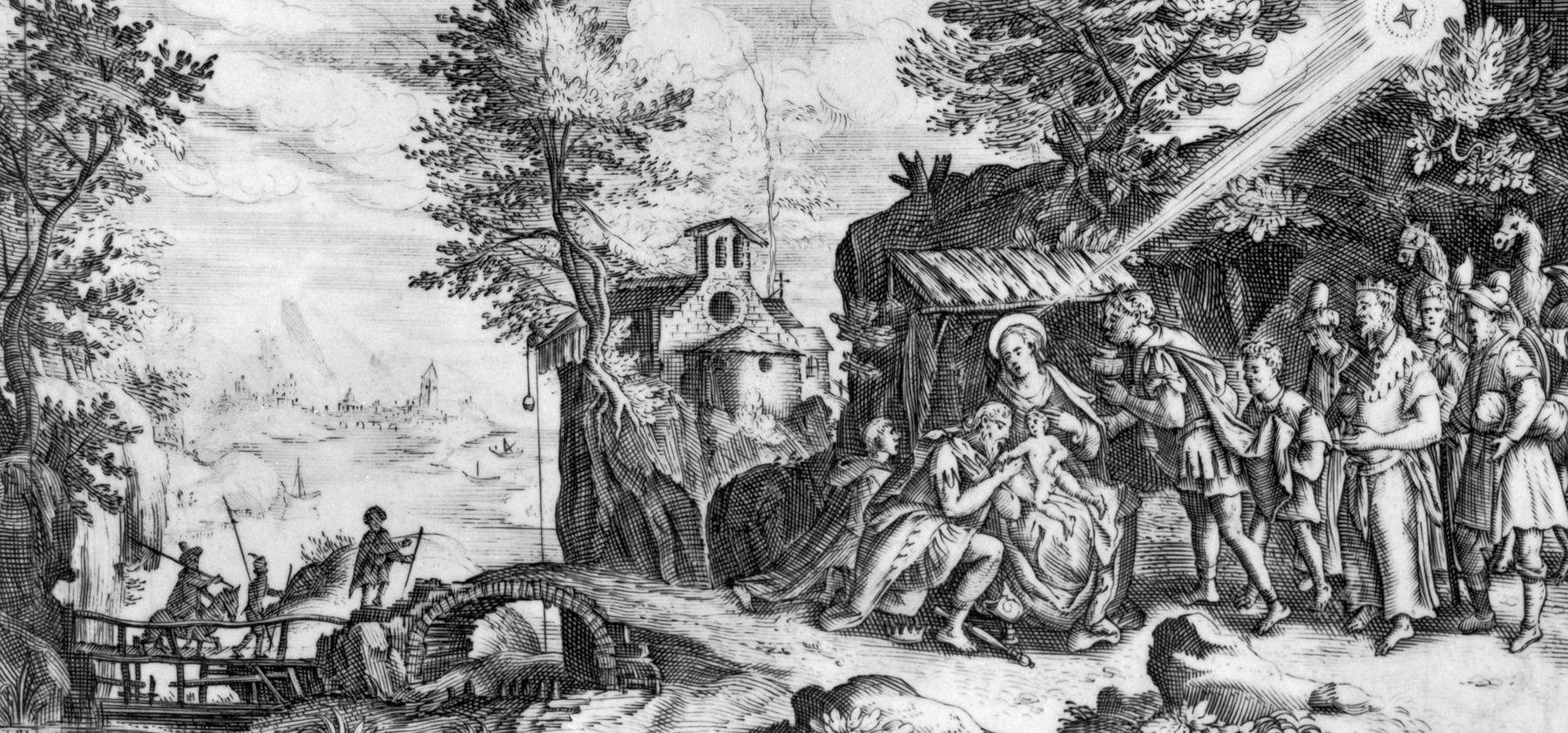
Adoration of the Magi, engraving on ivory

Johannes Wierix created engravings on precious metals and ivory. Such engravings, in particular of ivory plaques, were incorporated into luxurious small cabinets or chests, but were also set into frames as independent works of art. An Adoration of the Magi (dated to 1590–1600, Walters Art Museum) engraved on ivory shows Wierix' refined technique.
