= Cornelis Cort =

Dutch artist (c. 1533–1578)

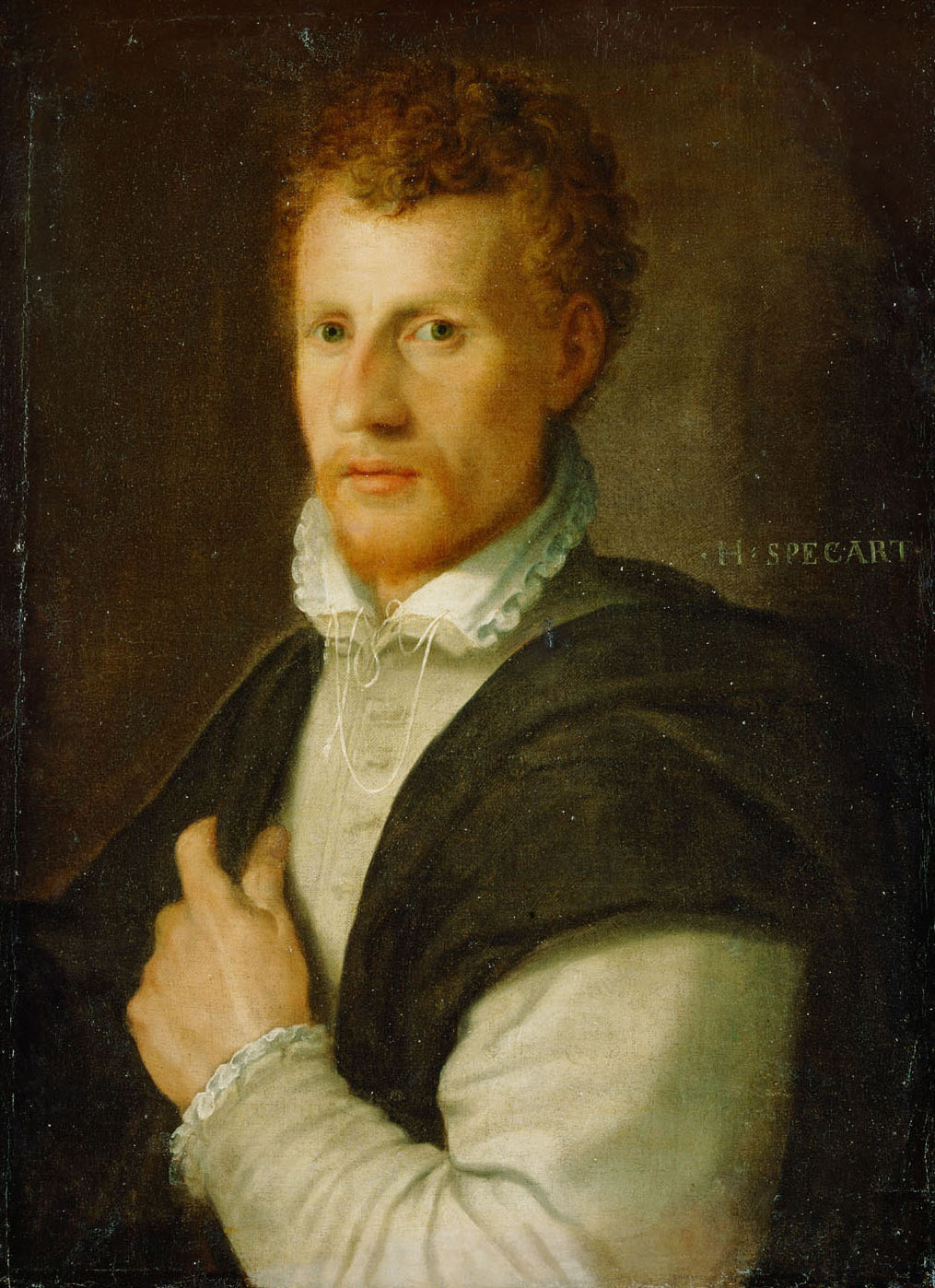
Cornelis Cort by Hans Speckaert

Cornelis Cort (c. 1533 – c. 17 March 1578) was a Dutch engraver and draughtsman. He spent the last 12 years of his life in Italy, where he was known as Cornelio Fiammingo.

== Biography ==
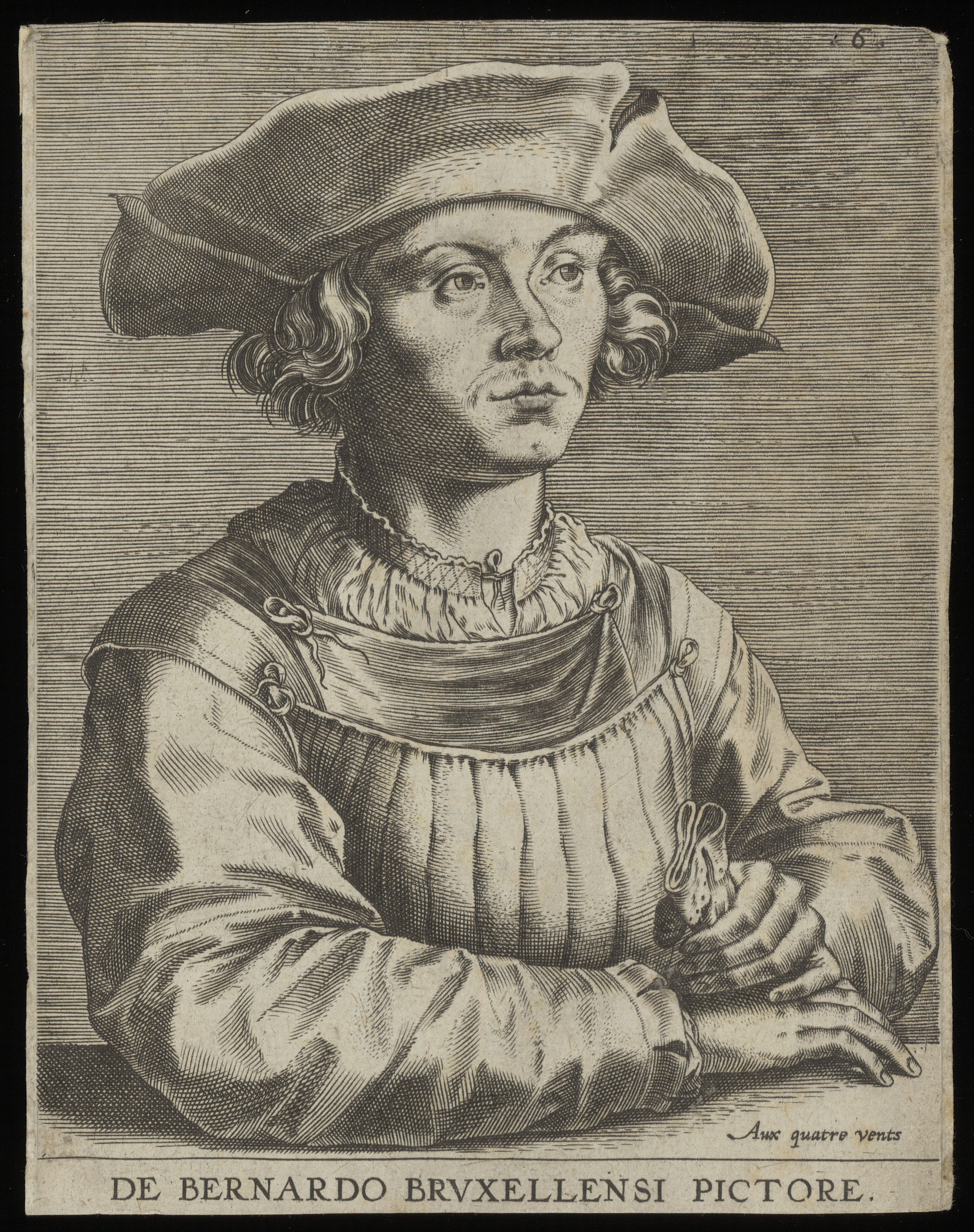
Print of Bernard van Orley, made by Cornelis Cort in the 16th century.

Born in Hoorn or Edam, Cort may have been a pupil of Dirck Volckertsz Coornhert in the 1550s in Haarlem. His first known engravings were published in Antwerp around 1553, though it is thought that he remained working in the Northern Netherlands. The publisher was Hieronymous Cock, under whom Cort may have apprenticed as well. A letter of 1567 from Dominicus Lampsonius to the artist Titian described Cock as Cort's master. Plates, which Cort produced for Cock were inscribed with Cort's name only after he left his apprenticeship with Cock.

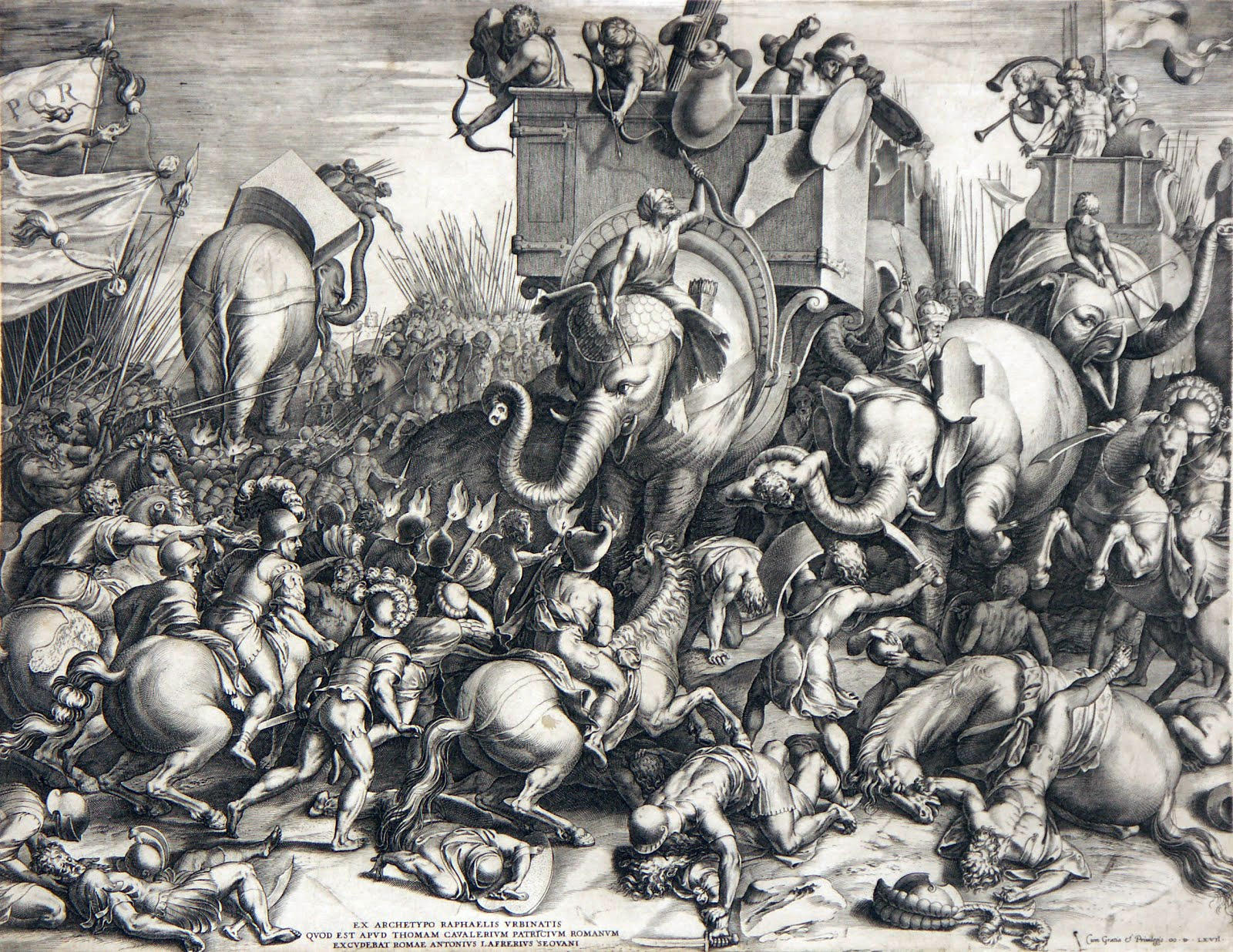
The Battle of Zama by Cornelis Cort

Cort moved to Venice and lived in the house of Titian in 1565 and 1566. He produced engravings based on Titian's works. Among these are the well-known copperplates of "St Jerome in the Desert", the "Magdalen", "Prometheus", "Diana and Actaeon", and "Diana and Callisto". From Italy he wandered back to the Netherlands, but he returned to Venice soon after 1567, proceeding thence to Bologna and Rome, where he produced engravings from all the great masters of the time.

In Rome he founded the well-known school in which, as Bartsch tells us, the simple line of Marcantonio was modified by a brilliant touch of the burin, afterwards imitated and perfected by Agostino Carracci in Italy and Nicolaes de Bruyn in the Netherlands. Before visiting Italy, Cort had been content to copy Michael Coxcie, Frans Floris, Heemskerk, Gillis Mostaert, Bartholomeus Spranger and Stradanus. In Italy he gave circulation to the works of Raphael, Titian, Polidoro da Caravaggio, Baroccio, Giulio Clovio, Muziano and the Zuccari.

Cort visited Florence between 1569 and 1571 probably working for the Medici family. He returned to Titian in Venice in 1571-1572. He spent the last year of his life in Rome, where he died. His connection with Cock and Titian is pleasantly illustrated in a letter addressed to the latter by Dominick Lampson of Liège in 1567. Cort is said to have engraved upwards of one hundred and fifty-one plates.

The art collector George Cumberland wrote in 1827 that

...if such men as Martin Rota, Cort, Bloemart, or Goltzius, did not often adhere to the style and character of head of the Artist they copied, yet they always gave enough to enable us to comprehend the principles of the composition; and we often have well drawn figures to make us some amends for the loss of sentiment in the heads, expression of hands, or local colouring.
