= Marrigje Rikken =

Dutch art historian, curator, and museum director (born 1984)

- Born: 1984 (age 41–42); Netherlands
- Education: University of Leiden (PhD)
- Occupations: Art historian, Curator, Museum director

Marrigje Rikken (born 1984) is a Dutch art historian, curator, and museum director, specializing in sixteenth- and seventeenth-century Netherlandish art. Her work bridges academic research, museum curation, and institutional leadership, with a sustained focus on early modern Netherlandish art and its interpretation within public collections.

== Education and early career ==
Rikken earned her PhD in art history from Leiden University in 2016, with a dissertation on animal depictions in Southern Netherlandish art from 1550 to 1630. Her doctoral research established animal imagery, visual knowledge, and artistic exchange in the Southern Netherlands as a defining strand of her early scholarship.

== Rijksmuseum and University of Amsterdam ==
She began her curatorial career as assistant curator of seventeenth-century Dutch Golden Age painting at the Rijksmuseum from 2006 to 2008, and subsequently lectured in art history at the University of Amsterdam from 2009 to 2015.

== Frans Hals Museum ==
In 2014, Rikken joined the Frans Hals Museum in Haarlem as Associate Curator of Old Masters. She was later promoted to Head of Collections and Exhibitions, and then Head of Collections and Presentations. Across her time in Haarlem, her role expanded from Old Master curation to strategic stewardship of the museum’s collections and exhibition program.

In 2021 at the museum, she curated an exhibition on Jacob Jordaens titled Thuis bij Jordaens, and in 2022, 'Haarlem Heroes: Other Masters'.

She also curated other exhibitions, including 2019's Frans Hals and the Moderns, contributed to the development of the museum’s trans-historical approach, and helped establish the Frans Hals Research Center.

Rikken also led conservation projects, including the restoration of a monumental painting by Maarten van Heemskerk. The painting was central to a 2024–2025 exhibition co-organized with the Stedelijk Museum Alkmaar and Teylers Museum.

== Stedelijk Museum Alkmaar ==
In mid-2024, Rikken was appointed director of the Stedelijk Museum Alkmaar, succeeding Lidewij de Koekkoek. Under Rikken’s leadership, the museum expanded its profile by securing the long-term transfer of the Kremer Collection, bringing major seventeenth-century works by Rembrandt, Frans Hals and Pieter de Hooch into the Stedelijk Museum Alkmaar’s holdings.

== Publications and scholarship ==
Rikken's work includes contributions to the "CODART Canon", the exhibition catalogue Frans Hals and the Moderns, and studies on exotic animals and early modern color printing. Her publications range from specialized early research on animal imagery, print culture, and seventeenth-century painting toward collaborative editorial work, exhibition catalogues, and museum-based scholarship:

=== 2024 ===
- Rikken, Marrigje. “Foreword.” In Frans Hals: Iconography – Technique – Reputation, pp. 7-8. Amsterdam: Amsterdam University Press, 2024.

=== 2021 ===
- Rikken, Marrigje. "Pieter Aertsen 'Meat Stall with the Holy Family', 1551." Essay in 100 Masterpieces. Dutch and Flemish art (1350-1750). CODART Canon, pp. 82-83. Tielt: Lannoo, 2021.

=== 2020 ===
- Entry in Blind Date. Portretten met blikken en blozen, edited by Katharina van Cauteren, pp. 394-395. Veurne: Hannibal Books, 2020.
- Hillegers, Jasper, Elmer Kolfin, Marrigje Rikken, and Eric Jan Sluijter (eds.). Journal of Historians of Netherlandish Art 12:1 (Winter 2020).

=== 2019 ===
- Entries in Rubens, Van Dyck and the Splendour of Flemish Painting, edited by Júlia Tátrai, pp. 196-197, 252-253, and 268-269. Budapest, 2019.

=== 2018 ===
- Rikken, Marrigje (ed.). Frans Hals ontmoet Singer Sargent, Van Gogh en Manet. Magazine to accompany the exhibition Frans Hals and the Moderns. Haarlem: Frans Hals Museum, 2018.

=== 2017 ===
- Rikken, Marrigje. "Datasets en motiefontlening in diervoorstellingen." Article in RKD Bulletin (2017), no. 1, pp. 26-33. The Hague: RKD – Netherlands Institute for Art History, 2017.

=== 2016 ===
- Rikken, Marrigje. "From top to bottom and from root to crown: plant and animal drawings in the Print Room of Leiden University." Essay in For Study and Delight: Drawings and Prints from Leiden University, edited by J. Schaeps, E. Grasman, E. Kolfin, and N. Bartelings, pp. 86-115. Chicago: Chicago University Press, 2016.
- Rikken, Marrigje. Dieren verbeeld: diervoorstellingen in tekeningen, prenten en schilderijen door kunstenaars uit de Zuidelijke Nederlanden tussen 1550 en 1630. Unpublished dissertation. University of Leiden, 2016.
- Rikken, Marrigje, Ildikó Ember, and Júlia Tátrai (eds.). Hollandse meesters uit Boedapest. Topstukken uit het Szépmüvészeti Múzeum. English edition: Dutch Old Masters from Budapest. Highlights from the Szépmüvészeti Múzeum. Rotterdam: Nai010 uitgevers, 2016.

=== 2015 ===
- Kolfin, Elmer, and Marrigje Rikken. "Colourful Topography: A Short-Lived Practice in Amsterdam Print Publishing around 1700." Essay in Printing Colour 1400-1700: History, Techniques, Functions and Receptions, edited by A. Stijnman and E. Savage, pp. 207-215. Boston: Brill, 2015.

=== 2014 ===
- Rikken, Marrigje. "Exotic Animal Paintings by Jan Brueghel the Elder and Roelant Savery." Article in Intersections, vol. 32 (2014), pp. 400-430.
- Rikken, Marrigje. "A Spanish Album of Drawings of Animals in a South-Netherlandish Context: a Reattribution to Lambert Lombard." Article in The Rijksmuseum Bulletin, vol. 62, no. 2 (2014), pp. 106-123.

=== 2012 ===
- Rikken, Marrigje. "Abraham Ortelius as intermediator for the Antwerp animal trailblazers." Article in Yearbook for the European Culture of Science, vol. 6 (2012), pp. 95-128.
- Rikken, Marrigje. "Conrad Gessners motieven in Antwerpen: een debat in beelden." Article in De Boekenwereld: Tijdschrift voor boek en prent (Veranderlijke dieren van Conrad Gessner), vol. 29, no. 1 (2012), pp. 21-32.

=== 2011 ===
- Rikken, Marrigje. "Nicolaas Verkolje en het classicisme." Essay in Nicolaas Verkolje 1673-1746: De fluwelen hand, edited by P. Knolle and E. Korthals Altes, pp. 23-33. Zwolle: Waanders, 2011.
- Rikken, Marrigje, and Z. Benders. "Jacob van Ruisdael's Landscape with Waterfall." Article in The Rijksmuseum Bulletin, vol. 59, no. 3 (2011), pp. 272-285.
- Rikken, Marrigje, and P.J. Smith. "Jan Brueghel's Allegory of Air (1621) in natural historical perspective." Article in Nederlands Kunsthistorisch Jaarboek (Art and Science), (2011), pp. 86-115.

=== 2010 ===
- Rikken, Marrigje. "Melchior d'Hondecoeter – Bird Painter." Essay in Intolerance, edited by W. de Rooij and B. Meyer-Krahmer, pp. 9-32. Düsseldorf: Feymedia Verlag, 2010.

=== 2009 ===
- Rikken, Marrigje. "Melchior d'Hondecoeter: la fastuosidad de los aviarios barrocos." Article in Numen: Revista de arte, no. 7 (2009), pp. 38-53.

=== 2008 ===
- Rikken, Marrigje. Melchior d'Hondecoeter: Vogelschilder / Melchior d'Hondecoeter: Bird painter. Amsterdam: Nieuw Amsterdam, 2008.
- Rikken, Marrigje. "Het Utrechts Zang-Prieeltjen: een valse noot tussen de liedboeken?". Article in De zeventiende eeuw (Klank van de stad), vol. 24, no. 1 (2008), pp. 66-88.
- Rikken, Marrigje. "Vroege kleurendruk in Amsterdam: een onbekend zeventiende-eeuws plaatwerk van Carel Allard." Article in De Boekenwereld: Tijdschrift voor boek en prent (Vroege kleurendruk in Amsterdam), vol. 24, no. 4 (2008), pp. 202-226.

=== 2007 ===
- Rikken, Marrigje, and E. Kolfin. "A Very Personal Copy: Pieter van Veen's Illustrations to Montaigne's Essais." Article in Montaigne and the Low Countries (1580-1700), Intersections 8, edited by P.J. Smith and K.A.E. Enenkel, pp. 247-262. Leiden: Brill, 2007.
- Rikken, Marrigje. "B. Neumann, M.M. Lommen, J.C.E. Belinfante." Entry in Bijzondere collecties naar een nieuwe bibliotheek. Zwolle: Waanders, 2007.
- Rikken, Marrigje, and R. Suijver. "'Stel dat Ruisdael was gestopt met zijn watervallen...' John Constable te gast in het rijksmuseum." Article in Kunstkrant Rijksmuseum, no. 5 (2007), pp. 4-7.
- Rikken, Marrigje. "W.E. Franits, Seventeenth-Century Dutch Genre Painting: Its Stylistic and Thematic Evolution." Review in De zeventiende eeuw, vol. 22, no. 2 (2006), pp. 380.
