= Hendrick van Cleve =

Hendrick van Cleve may refer to:

- Hendrick van Cleve I (active in Antwerp 1489-1519), the teacher of Jan Sanders van Hemessen
- Hendrick van Cleve III (ca. 1525-1589), painter of landscapes, portraits and architecture
