= Zacharias Paulusz =

Dutch Golden Age painter

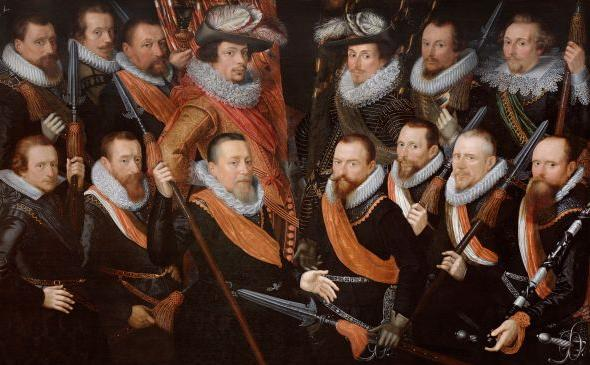
- Officers of the Old or St. George schutterij in 1621.
- Born: Zacharias Paulusz c. 1570-1590; Alkmaar
- Died: 1648 (aged 57–78); Alkmaar
- Known for: Painting
- Movement: Baroque

Zacharias Paulusz (c. 1570-1590 – 1648) was a Dutch Golden Age portrait painter from Alkmaar.

== Biography ==
According to Houbraken he painted the "Old" or "St. George" schutterij in Alkmaar in 1620, 1627, and 1628, the last of which he saw as an over-the-mantel piece in the "Hopman's" room of the old militia meeting hall in Alkmaar. According to the RKD he painted the "Old" schutterij in 1615, 1621, 1629, and 1630. He signed his works with the monogram ZP fecit.

The Stedelijk Museum Alkmaar has four militia pieces by him on display. During the period he painted in Alkmaar, the city had two militia's, that previous to the Protestant Reformation had been called the militias of St. George and St. Sebastian. After the Reformation the civic guard was reorganized and secularized (they no longer kept altars to St. George and St. Sebastian in the church). The St. George militia was called the Old guard, and the St. Sebastian militia was called the New guard. In 1615 Paulusz painted the "Old guard" after the painter Frans Menton painted the "New guard".
