= Richard Aertsz =

Dutch Renaissance painter (1482-1577)

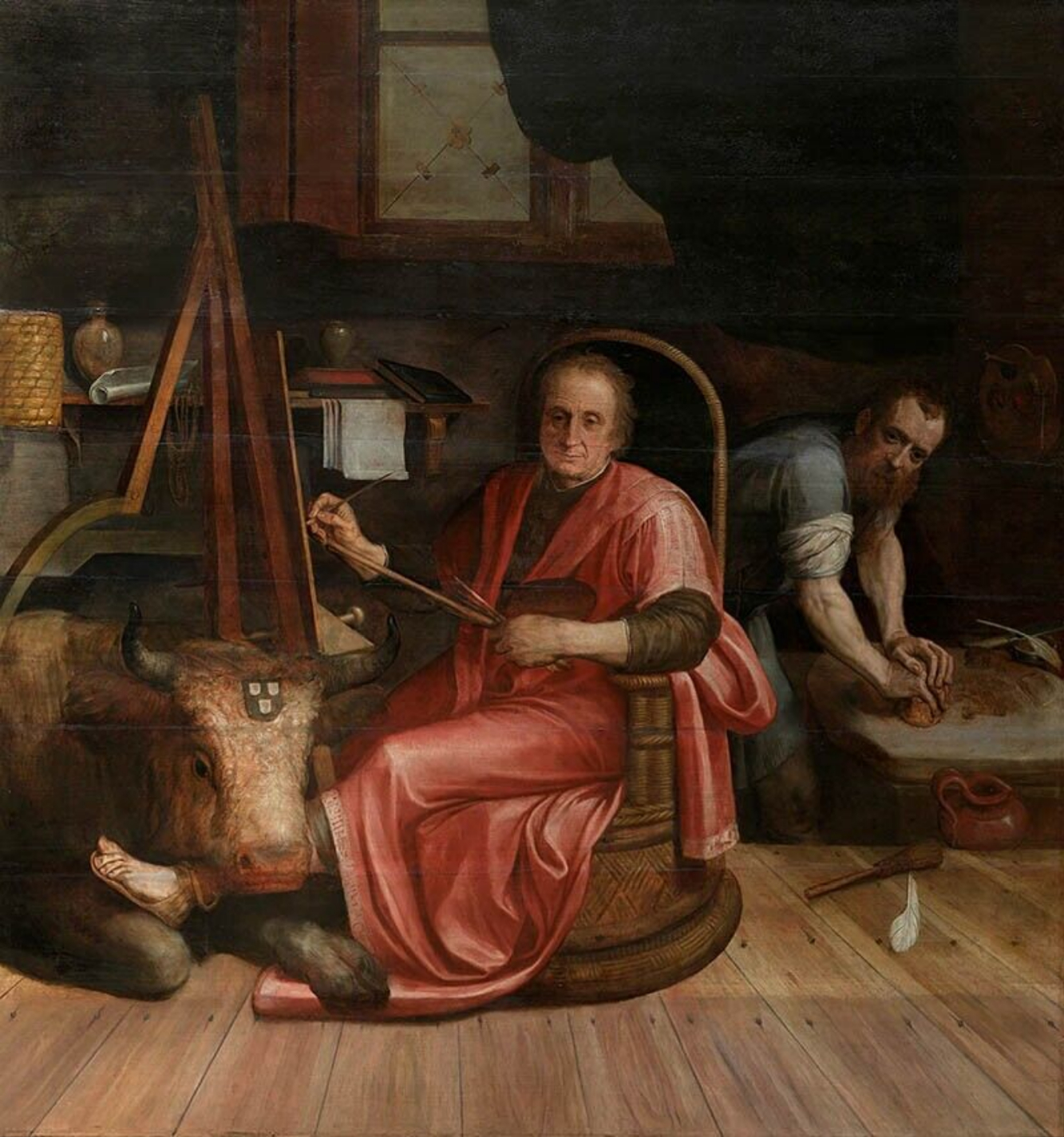
Frans Floris painted a portrait of his friend Rijckaert Aertsz as St. Luke as a tribute to him, around 1560.

Richard Aartsz, or Rijckaert Aertsz (1482 – May 1577) was a Dutch Renaissance painter of historical allegories. Most of his works were painted while he lived in Antwerp. He was a pupil of Jan Mostaert in Haarlem. Frans Floris became his pupil and friend.

== Biography ==
Rykert (or Rijck) was born in Wijk aan Zee, (Beverwijk) and was the son of a fisherman. As a boy he had burned his leg, so he was sent to Haarlem for treatment, but because of an incompetent physician or because it was simply too late, the wound further deteriorated until his leg had to be amputated, which compelled him to walk with a crutch. This is why he was nicknamed Rijk met de Stelt (Rich with the Crutch), which is his now his best known artist name.

During his period of recovery, he often sat near the fire, and drew on the white stone hearth wall with charcoals, which he did so well that his parents asked if he would like to be a painter or draughtsman, and when he responded seriously in the affirmative, he was apprenticed to Jan Mostaert, then a master of a painting workshop in Haarlem. He was such a studious apprentice that he soon became a good artist himself. He painted the altar doors of the Carrier's guild (Zakkendragersgilde, a guild for turf carriers and other cart trades) in the St. Bavochurch. The altar itself had been painted earlier by Jacob van Haarlem, the master of Mostaert. The altar door subjects were designed by Rijck, and were the history of Joseph (son of Jacob); one side was devoted to his brothers who came for grain, and the other side was Joseph himself seated like a king, hiding his identity for his brothers in Egypt; pieces which were highly praised. Rijck was a successful painter who painted many pieces in Friesland, but most of these were destroyed during the Beeldenstorm.

Rijck eventually traveled to Antwerp where he married Catharina Dircksdr and joined the Guild of Saint Luke in 1520. He was able to make a living by painting the "flesh tones" (naeckten can also mean nudes) for other painters in return for a day-wage. He died there in May 1577, famed as a quiet, happy, peaceful and pious man, much loved for his good mood. In reference to his name and crutch, he often said "Ik ben rijk en wel gestelt" ("I am rich and well off", a pun on his name Rijckaert (rijck means rich, while rijkaard means rich man), and having to use a crutch (gestelt means "with a crutch", while welgesteld means "well off").

In his old age, his vision was badly impaired, so that he was barely able to see what he was doing. When he put the paint on the panels so thickly that no one liked it, the paint often needed to be scraped off again, which upset him because he felt no one appreciated his work.

His portrait was painted by his friend Frans Floris around 1560, as the central figure in a painting of St. Luke for the Antwerp Guild of St. Luke, probably because he was an upbeat and popular character in the guild. He was the father of the painter Lambert Ryck Aertsz, called Robbesant.
