= Marten van Cleve =

Flemish painter and draftsman (c. 1527–1581)

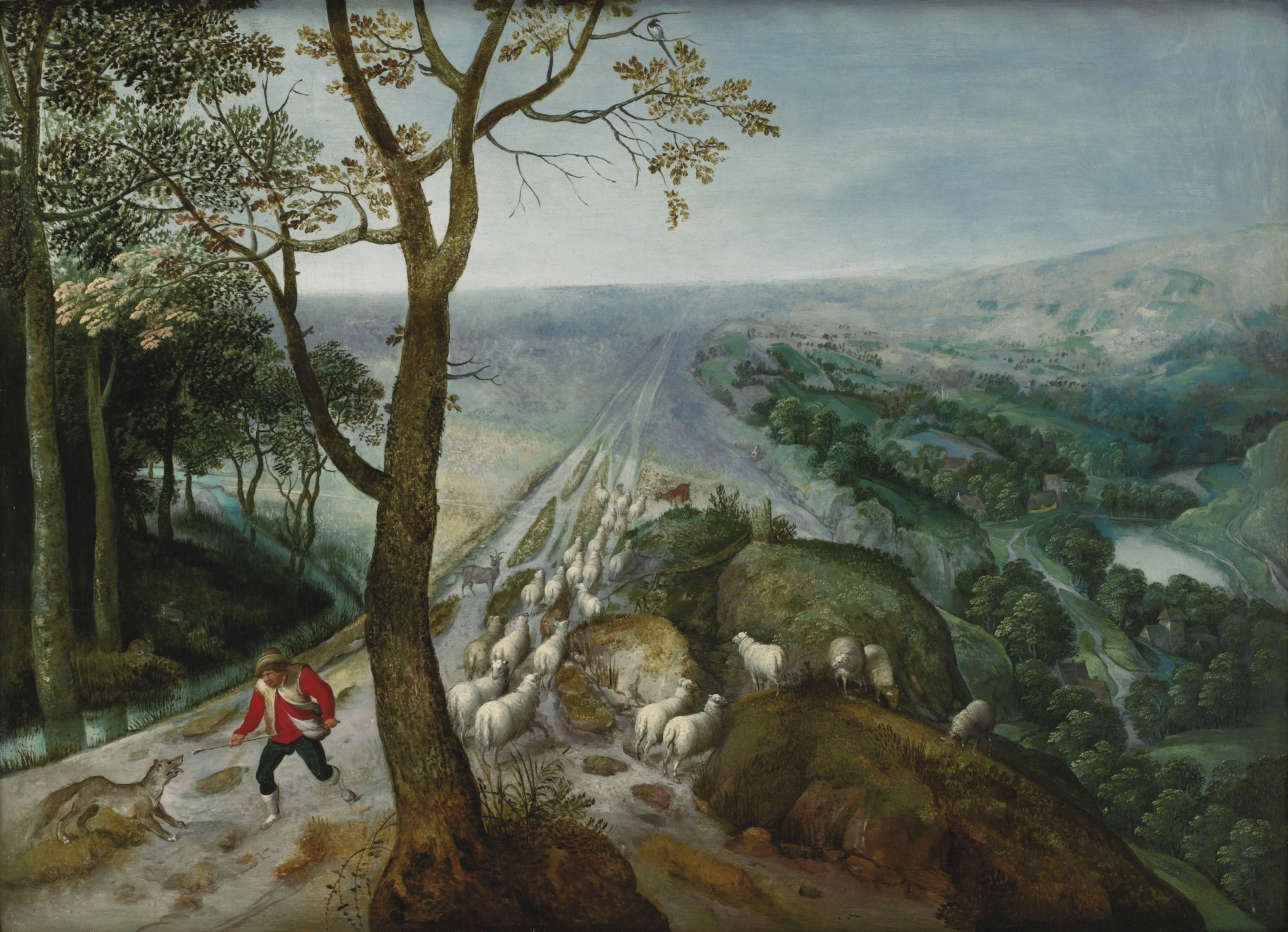
The good shepherd

Marten van Cleve the Elder (Antwerp, c. 1527 – Antwerp, before 24 November 1581) was a Flemish painter and draftsman active in Antwerp between 1551 and 1581. Van Cleve is mainly known for his genre scenes with peasants and landscapes, which show a certain resemblance with the work of Pieter Bruegel the Elder. Marten van Cleve was one of the leading Flemish artists of his generation. His subjects and compositions were an important influence on the work of Pieter Brueghel the Younger and other genre painters of his generation.

== Life ==
Details about the life of Marten van Cleve are scarce. He was born in Antwerp as the son of Willem van Cleve the Elder who had become a master in the Antwerp Guild of Saint Luke in 1518. Based on his own declaration in a document dated 2 April 1567 that he was then 40 years of age, it is assumed van Cleve was born in 1526 or 1527. Marten's elder brother Hendrick van Cleve III and his younger brother Willem van Cleve the Younger were both painters.

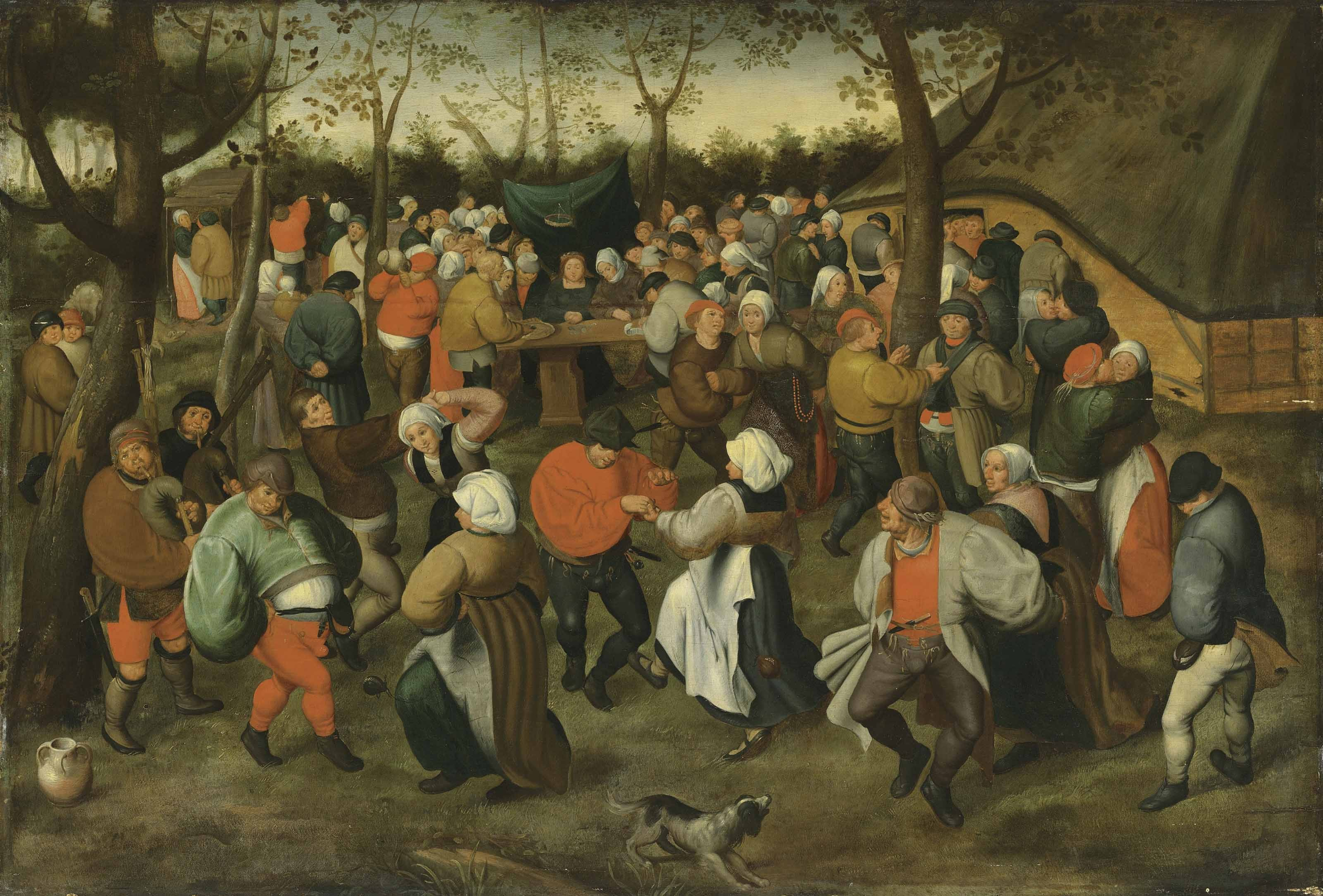
Outdoor wedding dance

Marten van Cleve first studied under his father. According to the early Flemish biographer Karel van Mander Marten van Cleve studied under Frans Floris, the leading Flemish history painter in the mid 16th century. There is no evidence for this apprenticeship. Some stylistic similarities with Frans Floris' works that appear in van Cleve's early work and the engravings after his inventions make the apprenticeship plausible. Van Mander also stated that van Cleve did not follow the 16th century trend of Flemish painters to study in Italy. This may explain why van Cleve's work does not show the influence of Italian Mannerism with its unrealistic deformations. Marten van Cleve became a master in the Antwerp Guild of Saint Luke in 1551.

Marten van Cleve married Maria de Greve on 7 January 1556. The couple had four sons named Gillis, Marten (called 'Marten the Younger), Joris and Nicolaas who all became painters. Marten van Cleve had five registered pupils, one of whom became a master. One of his pupils may have been Hans Jordaens.

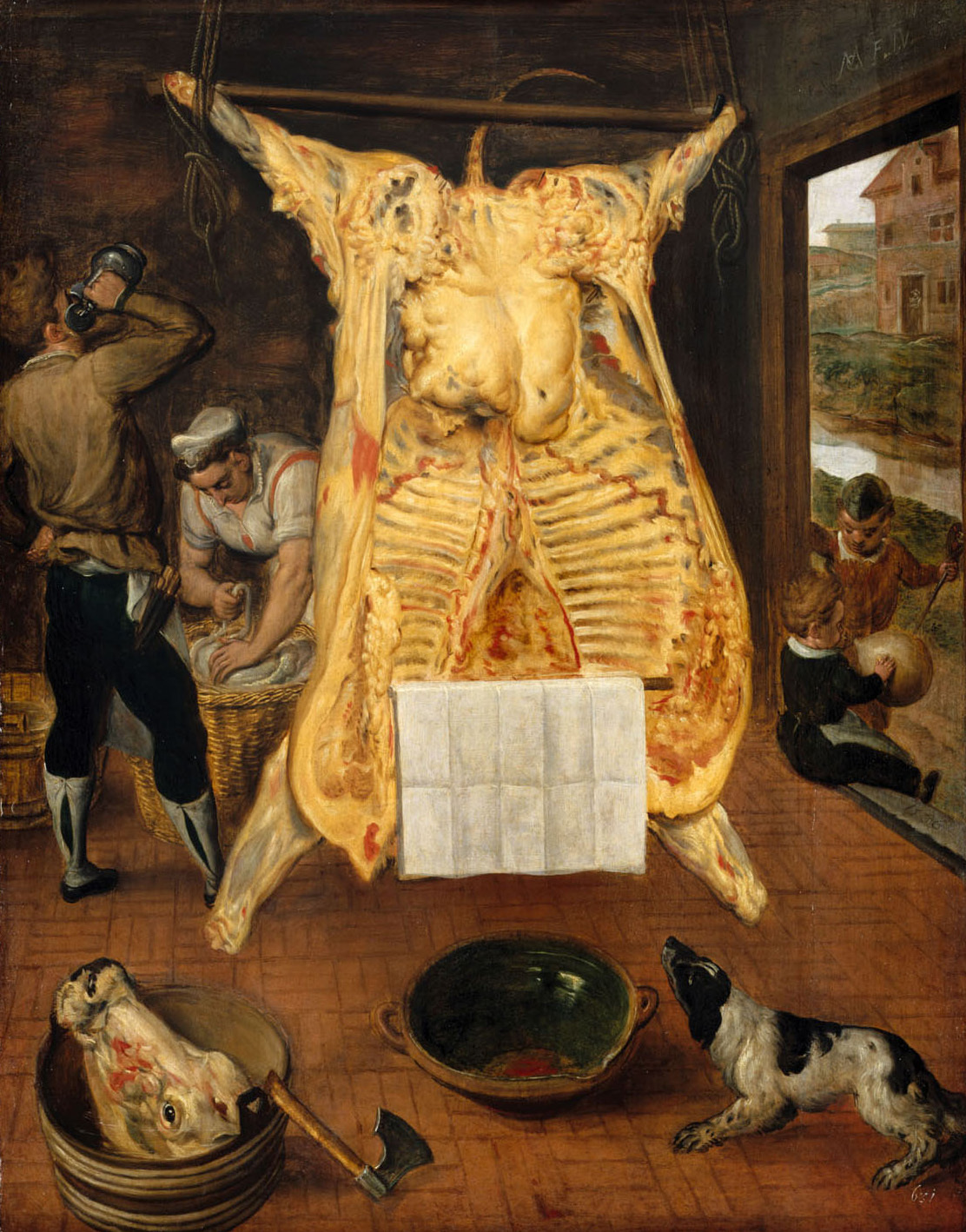
Slaughtered ox

Between 1560 and 1570 Marten van Cleve operated an important workshop with a large output. The majority of the works were copies of Marten's original inventions. It is probable that his own sons also assisted in his studio. Van Cleve was a regular collaborator with a number of prominent landscape painters.

Marten van Cleve Marten died in 1581, at which time he was suffering from gout and rheumatism.

== Work ==
Marten van Cleve was principally a genre painter, who specialized in peasant scenes and landscapes. Only about five of his works are signed and properly documented. He depicted predominantly low-life scenes of peasant weddings and dances, kermisses, brawling peasants and soldiers and plundering soldiers, which show his debt to the work of Pieter Bruegel the Elder. As the artist only left few signed works, the attribution of works to him has been difficult and several attributions have been rejected in recent years. Even the attributions by Dr. Klaus Ertz in his catalogue raisonné of Marten van Cleve's paintings and drawings published in 2014 have been questioned.

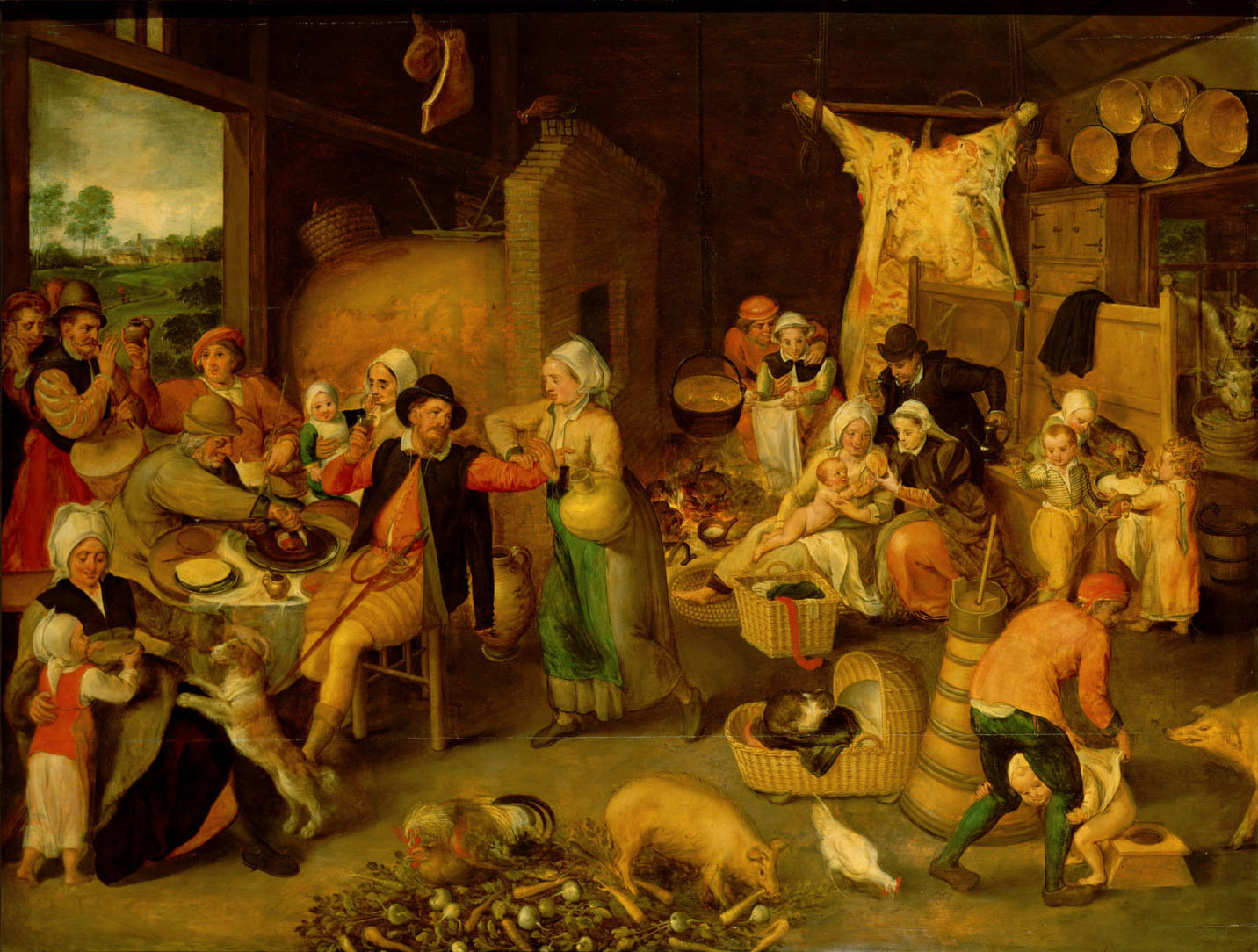
Farm interior with important visitors

His oldest authenticated work is the Farm interior with important visitors (Kunsthistorisches Museum, Vienna), which was included in the 1659 inventory of Archduke Leopold Wilhelm of Austria. It is regarded as a youth work and shows the large kitchen of a farm. A couple from the city are in the kitchen to visit their child which they have entrusted to a wet nurse. The work, which is probably dated to around 1555–1560, shows the influence of Frans Floris in its fluid brush stroke. The choice of subject matter was likely influenced by Pieter Aertsen's peasant scenes from the period 1550–1560. Unlike Aertsen, van Cleve's treatment of space is more modern and his work is free of the influence of the Mannerism of the Flemish Romanists who were inspired by contemporary Italian art. The influence of Pieter Bruegel the Elder is not yet visible in this early work.

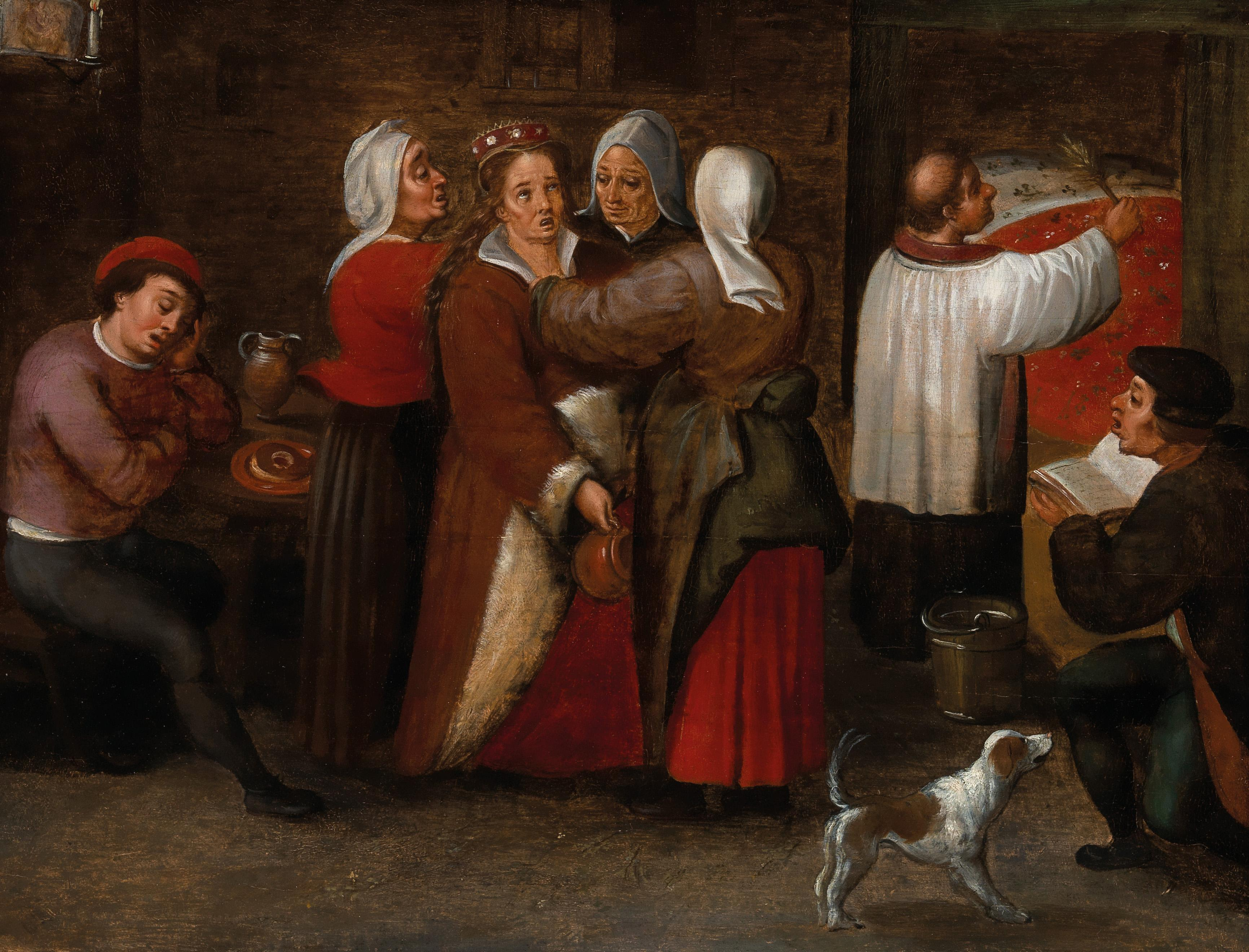
The blessing of the bridal bed

Van Cleve came under the influence of Pieter Bruegel the Elder's work in the 1560s. It is a certain resemblance with the work of Bruegel (particularly in the numbers of figures depicted), which has led to the often unjustifiable categorization of van Cleve as a follower of Bruegel. He was, however, never an imitator of that master. He took from Bruegel certain subjects and peasant types but was not interested in following some of the reactionary aspects of Bruegel's work such as the return to Hieronymus Bosch's surrealism and Joachim Patinir's world landscapes. On the whole van Cleve's scenes are descriptive rather than allegorical. Van Cleve attempted to correct or modernize Bruegel by a higher level of interest in realism. He also depicted his scenes from a lower viewpoint than Bruegel.

Another confirmed authentic work is the Slaughtered ox (Kunsthistorisches Museum, Vienna), which is monogrammed with 'M(v)G' in ligature and dated 1566. It is quite similar to a work of a Slaughtered pig by Joachim Beukelaer. While Beuckelaer's work is clearly a still life, van Cleve's composition is a genre work which emphasizes the anecdotal and genre aspects of the work. Van Cleve's composition may also have an allegorical meaning. A little boy sitting on the threshold of the door is blowing a bubble. The bubble is in fact the bladder of the ox, at the time a children's toy. It is possible that the bubble-blowing boy is a reference to the homo bulla motive, the idea that life is just a bubble that only lasts a very short time. The dead ox itself is a reminder of death and is thus linked to the 'memento mori' idea, the notion that humans should remember that they are mortal. Together with the Carnival in a village with beggars dancing dated 1579 (Hermitage Museum), the Slaughtered ox shows that van Cleve preferred a broad and free brushstroke. In the Carnival in a village with beggars dancing van Cleve has also used various motifs from Pieter Bruegel the Elder's works.

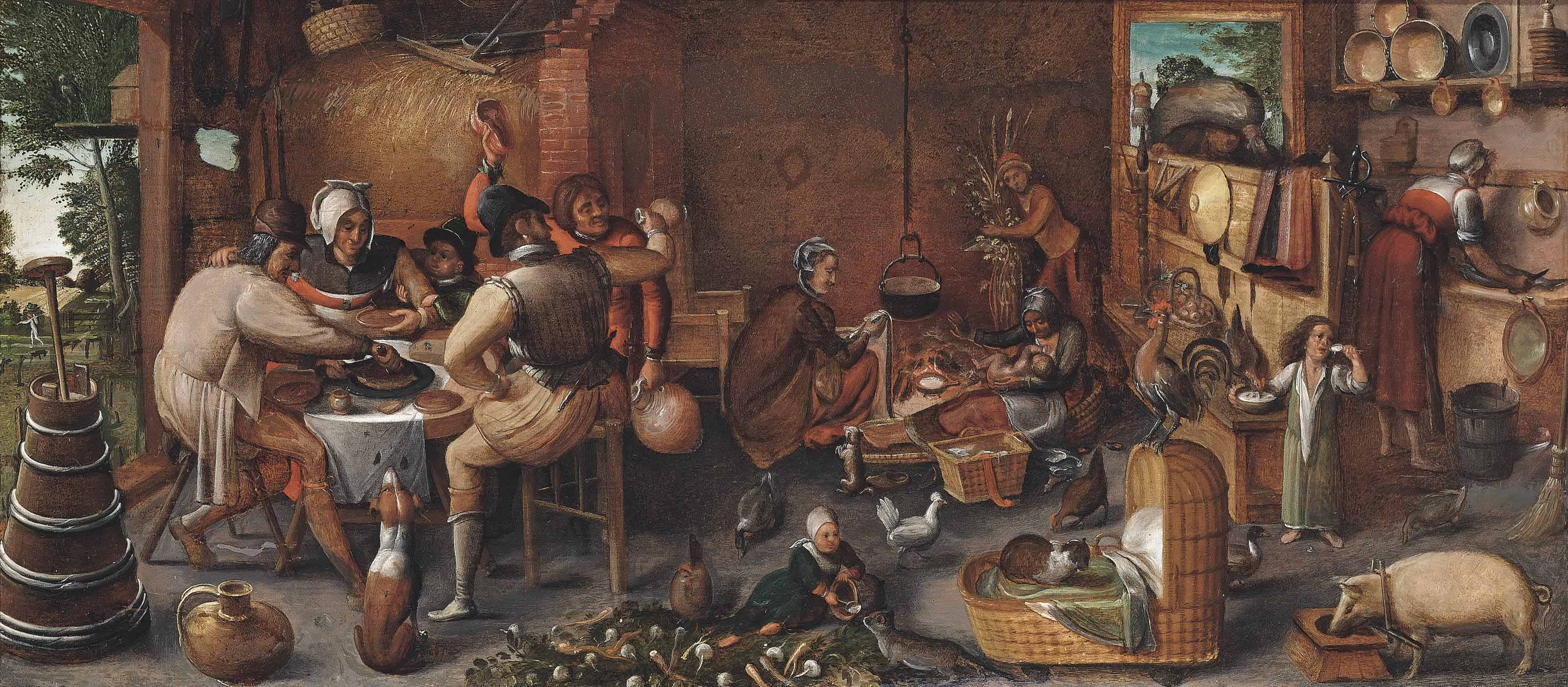
A visit to the wet nurse

Van Cleve developed a number of new themes such as the King Drinks, the original of which is probably the painting sold at Kunsthandel Abels, Cologne in 1965. This theme invented by van Cleve became very popular in the next century. His 'The good shepherd' was another original creation, which was widely imitated. Many Flemish artists, and in particular Pieter Brueghel the Younger, were inspired by these subjects. Marten van Cleve is believed to have been an important influence on the development of Pieter Brueghel the Younger's style, along the more widely recognised precedent of his father, Pieter Bruegel the Elder. The peasant wedding was a favourite theme of Cleve. He returned frequently to this subject depicting its various rituals and ceremonies, mostly in the form of cycles of small-scale panels. His Wedding Procession was widely copied by his workshop as well as Pieter Brueghel the Younger. Another popular theme of van Cleve was The Massacre of the Innocents and his version of this subject was copied even more frequently than the version of Pieter Bruegel the Elder. The attribution to van Cleve and his workshop of the various versions of the Massacre of the Innocents has been questioned on stylistic grounds, in particular on the basis of the fact that the more painterly handling of paint that is ascribed to van Cleve is missing in this body of work.

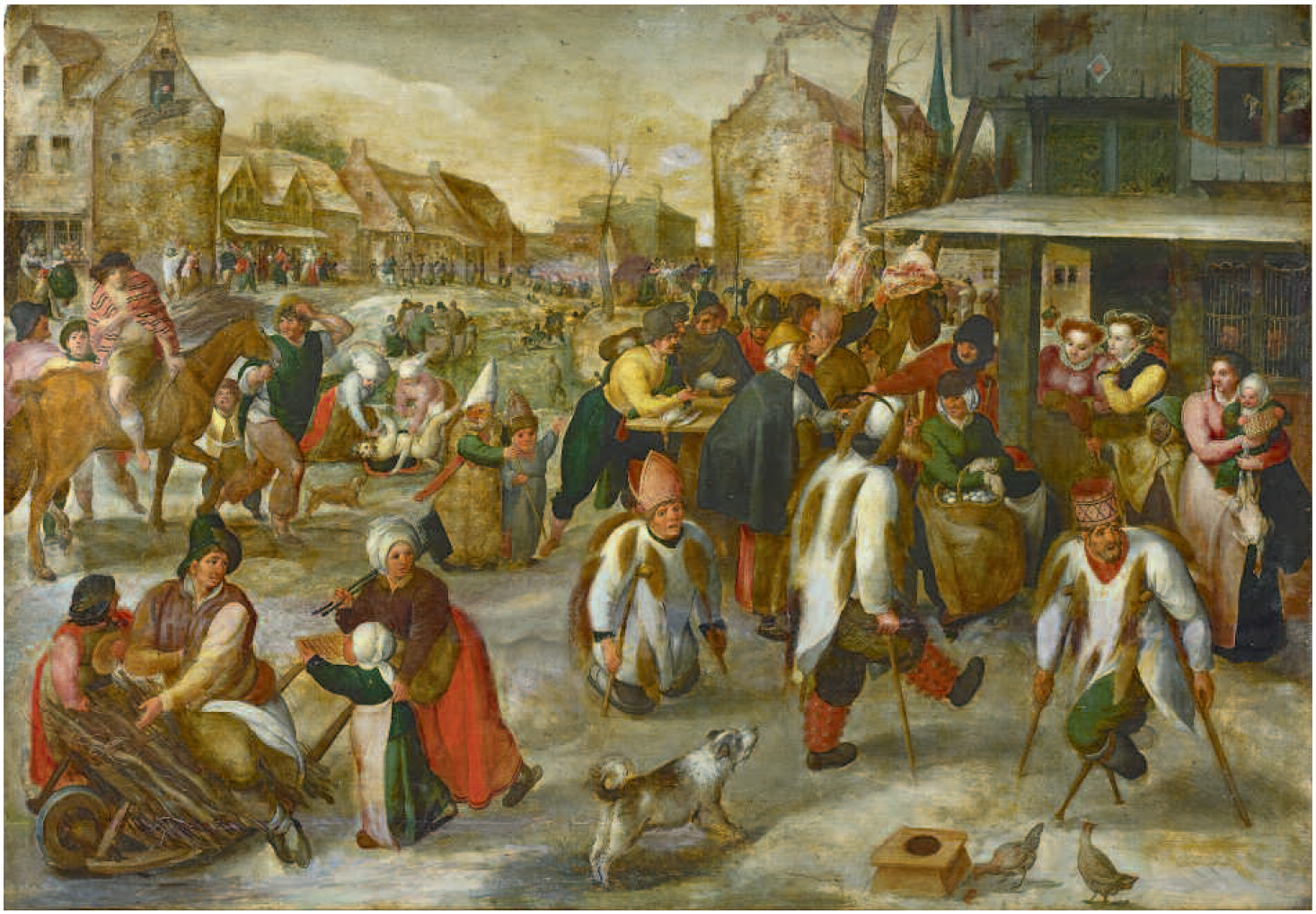
Carnival in a village with beggars dancing

Marten van Cleve collaborated with many prominent landscape painters, including Gillis van Coninxloo, Gillis Mostaert and Jacob Grimmer as well as his brother Hendrick for whom he painted the figures. Hendrick reciprocated and added to Marten's figure-pieces landscape backgrounds.

To Marten van Cleve have been attributed a lot of designs for prints published by the Antwerp printers and publishers including Willem van Haecht. It is believed that while apprenticed in the workshop of Frans Floris, Marten van Cleve assisted in the preparation of print designs after preliminary drawings made by Frans Floris. An example is van Cleve's signed drawing of Arachne (c. 1574, Kupferstichkabinett Berlin) made after Floris' design. This drawing was then used by Philip Galle as the basis for his engraving of Arachne or The textile industry. In his prints, van Cleve remained closer to his master Floris's designs. Prominent engravers such as the Wierix brothers, Hans Bol, Philip Fruytiers, Johann Sadeler, Balthazar van den Bos and Philip Galle engraved the prints after van Cleve's designs.
