= George Boba =

French painter and engraver

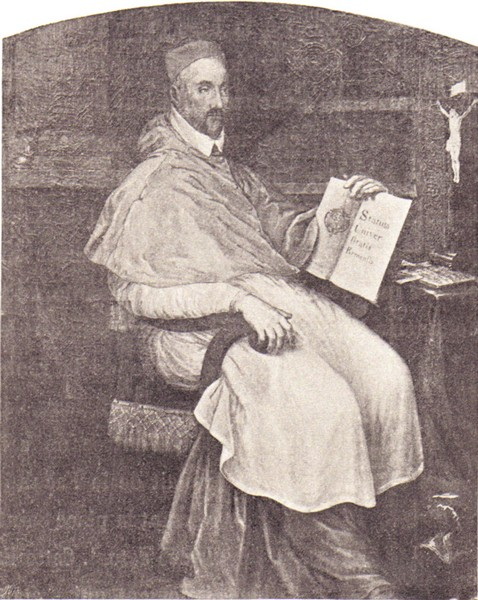
Charles, Cardinal of Lorraine, attributed to Boba, ca. 1570.

George Boba was a painter and engraver of the 16th century, known by the name of Maître Georges. He was a native of Rheims, and is said by Karel van Mander to have been a disciple of Frans Floris, and by others of Titian. His name in full, or included in a monogram very small, is found on some etchings of landscapes with historical subjects, after Primaticcio; Bartsch gives an account of six of them.
