= Lidewij de Koekkoek =

Dutch art historian and curator (born 1963)

- Born: 1963 (age 62–63)
- Education: Leiden University
- Occupations: Art historian, museum director

Lidewij de Koekkoek (born 1963) is a Dutch art historian and museum director, known for her leadership roles in several prominent Dutch museums, including the Rembrandt House Museum and the Frans Hals Museum.

== Education and early career ==
De Koekkoek studied art history at Leiden University in the Netherlands. She began her career in contemporary art and architecture before transitioning to the heritage sector. Her early professional experiences include positions at the Dutch Textile Museum in Tilburg, the Netherlands Architecture Institute in Rotterdam, and the Dordrecht council.

== Directorships ==
=== Stedelijk Museum Alkmaar (2008–2016) ===
In 2008, Lidewij de Koekkoek was appointed director of the Stedelijk Museum Alkmaar. During her tenure, she oversaw the museum's privatization, a major renovation, and a comprehensive rebranding strategy. The museum increasingly focused on presenting both old masters and modern art, establishing itself as a key regional institution in the Dutch museum landscape.

=== Rembrandt House Museum (2016–2022) ===
In October 2016, de Koekkoek became General Director of the Rembrandt House Museum (Museum Het Rembrandthuis) in Amsterdam. She introduced a renewed artistic direction centered on Rembrandt's life, art, and social context. Under her leadership, the museum organized several high-profile exhibitions, including:

- Glenn Brown (2017)
- Ferdinand Bol & Govert Flinck (2018)
- Rembrandt's Social Network (2019)

De Koekkoek also championed diversity and inclusion, forging partnerships with initiatives such as *Musea Bekennen Kleur* and engaging with the international program *OFBYFOR ALL* to increase community participation and institutional accessibility.

=== Frans Hals Museum (2022–present) ===
In March 2022, de Koekkoek was appointed managing director of the Frans Hals Museum in Haarlem, succeeding Ann Demeester. She expressed enthusiasm for leading an institution that unites old, modern, and contemporary art within a single curatorial vision.

Her vision includes enhancing the museum's societal relevance by addressing contemporary issues such as canon diversification and the inclusion of polyphonic historical narratives.

=== Professional focus and affiliations ===
Throughout her career, de Koekkoek has prioritized engaging diverse audiences with art, architecture, and cultural heritage. Her leadership has consistently emphasized inclusivity, accessibility, and the expansion of traditional art historical narratives within museum settings.

She has been an active member of CODART, the international network for curators of Dutch and Flemish art, since 2009, contributing to the organization's mission of fostering scholarly exchange and international collaboration.
