= Stedelijk Museum Alkmaar =

Coordinates: 52.6334°N 4.7436°E

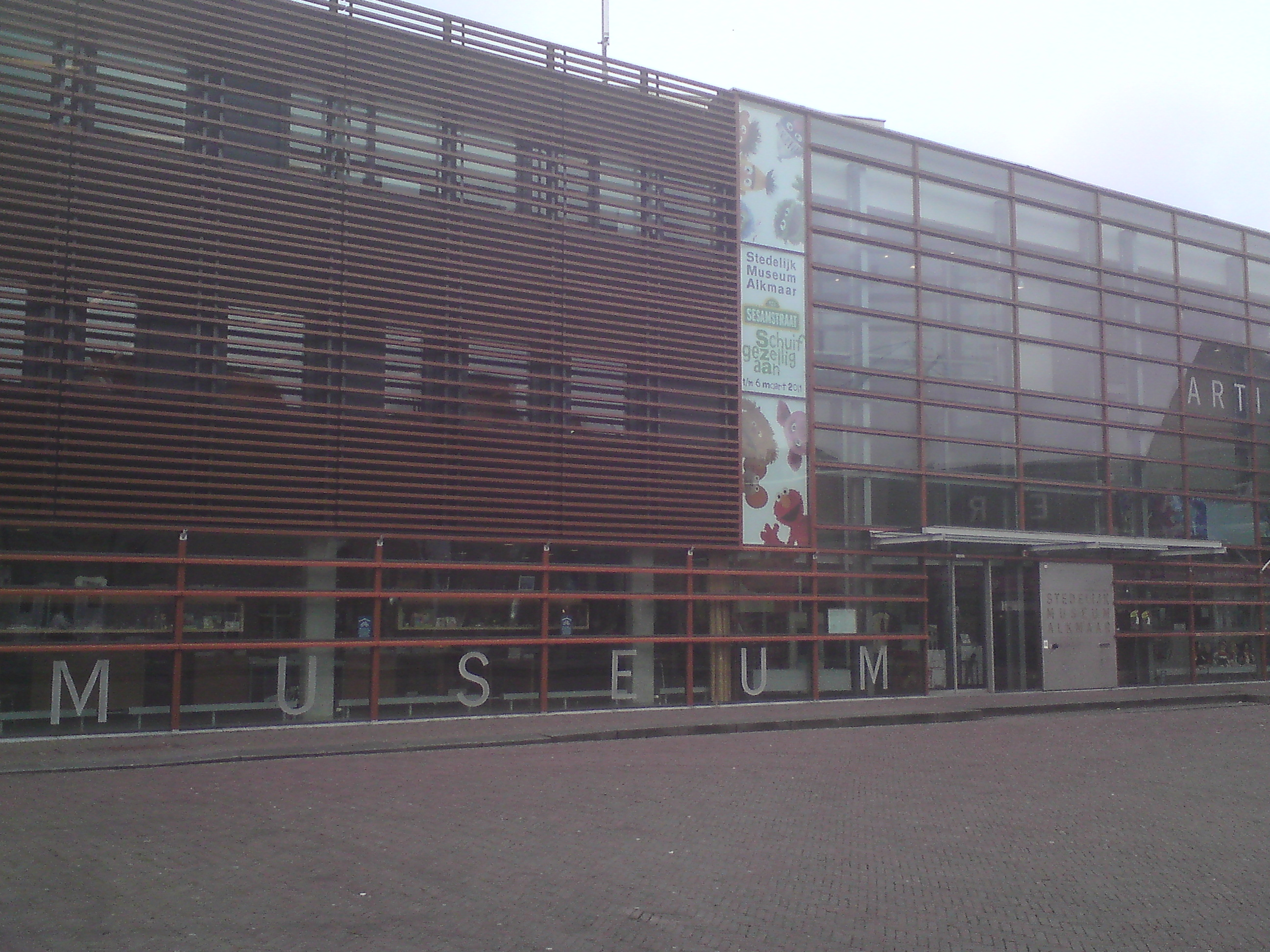
Stedelijk Museum Alkmaar

Stedelijk Museum Alkmaar is a city museum located in the center of Alkmaar on the Canadaplein (Canada Square). The museum is devoted to presenting and preserving the cultural history of Alkmaar and the surrounding region.

== History ==
In 1873 the museum was founded on the Breedstraat. In 1968 it moved to the Doelenstraat in the old Schutterij building. It moved to its present location in 2000. The museum hosts a collection of historical paintings and artifacts, some of which date back to the period before the Protestant Reformation.

The older paintings are by the Master of Alkmaar, Frans Menton, Zacharias Paulusz, Caesar van Everdingen, Pieter Jansz Saenredam, Maarten van Heemskerck, Lambert Doomer, and Jan de Baen.

The more modern art is represented by members of the Bergen School (art), but also has examples of Expressionism and Cubism. Some of the more prominent names in the collection are Charley Toorop, Henri Le Fauconnier, Jan Sluyters, Leo Gestel, and Piet Mondriaan (one sketch).

The museum has a café and holds temporary art exhibitions, often focusing on local artists and themes.

Lidewij de Koekkoek was the director from 2008-2021 and Marrigje Rikken was appointed director in 2024.
