= Frans Menton =

Dutch Golden Age portrait painter

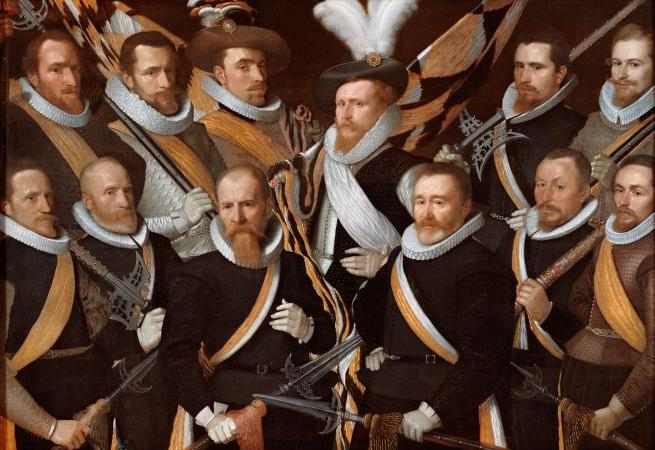
- Officers of the Young or St Sebastian schutterij in 1611.
- Born: Frans Menton ca.1550 Haarlem
- Died: 1615 (aged 64–65); Alkmaar
- Known for: Painting
- Movement: Baroque

Fransoys or Frans Menton (c.1550–1615) was a Dutch Golden Age portrait painter.

== Biography ==
Little is known of his early life, but according to Van Mander in 1604, he spoke with him about his training as a pupil of Frans Floris in his workshop in Antwerp. Apparently that is where Menton received much of his training. Van Mander based his list of Frans Floris pupils on Menton's information. Of Menton himself, Van Mander stated that he was a good portrait painter and engraver. Houbraken repeated Van Mander's comment and added that his gravestone in Alkmaar gave his death date as March 24, 1615.

The Stedelijk Museum Alkmaar has two militia pieces by him on display.

According to the RKD he signed his works with the monogram F.ME..
