= Hendrick van Cleve III =

Flemish painter, draughtsman and designer of prints (c. 1525–1590/5)

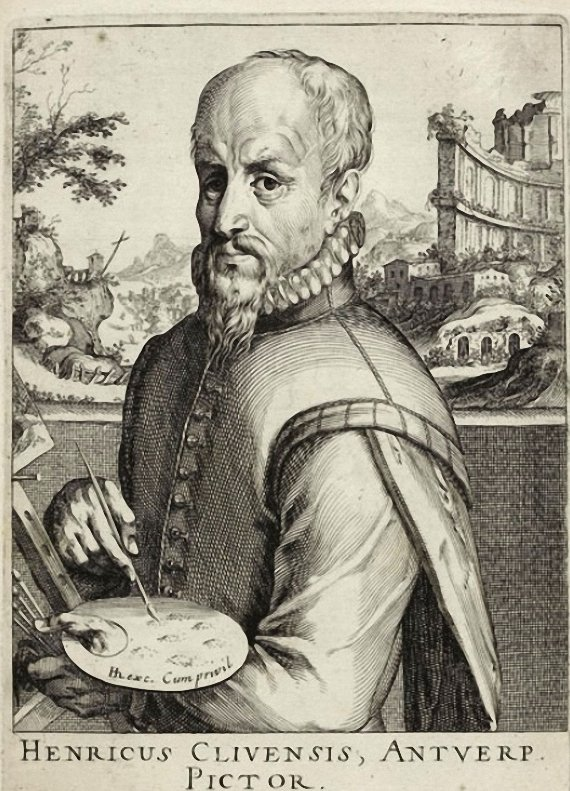
Hendrick van Cleve engraved by Simon Frisius, c. 1610

Hendrick van Cleve or Hendrik van Cleve III (c. 1525 in Antwerp – between 1590 and 1595) was a Flemish painter, draughtsman and designer of prints. He is known for topographical views, including views of Rome and the Vatican, as well as imaginary landscapes. Traditionally, a large number of depictions of the construction of the Tower of Babel have been attributed to him but most of these are now attributed to anonymous Flemish painters, who are referred to as 'The Hendrik van Cleve III Group'.

== Life ==
Hendrick van Cleve III was born in Antwerp around 1525 as the son of Willem van Cleve the Elder, a painter. He was the elder brother of Marten and of Willem and of three sisters. He is called "the third" to differentiate him from Hendrik van Cleve I (registered as a master of the Guild of St. Luke 1489/90) and Hendrick II (Guild of St. Luke, 1534), about whom little else is known.

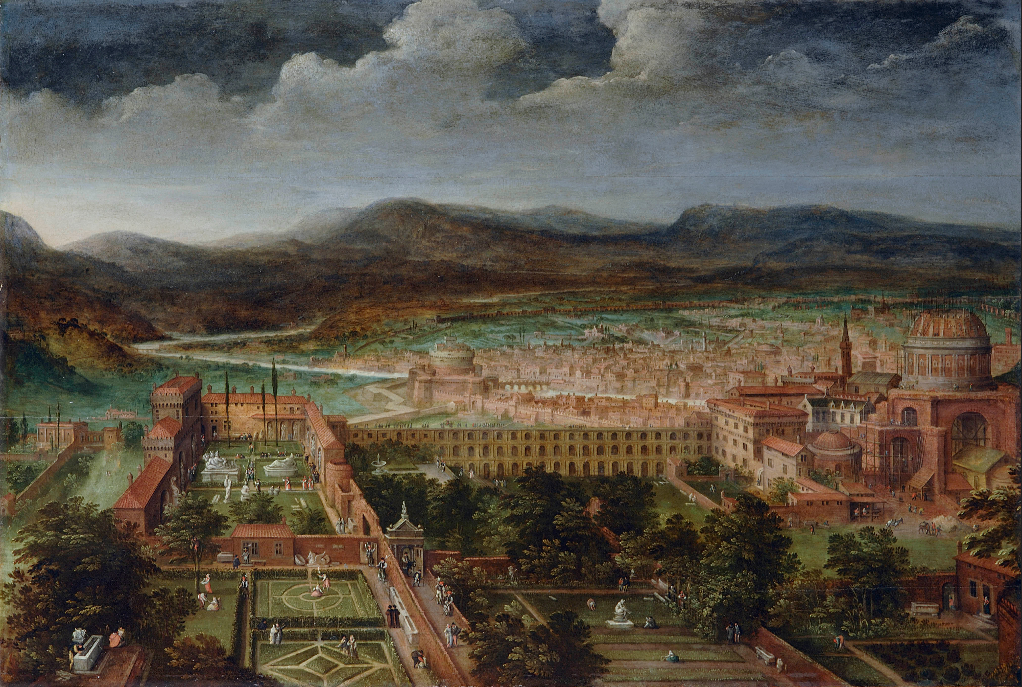
View of the Vatican gardens and St Peter's basilica

Hendrick and his brothers initially learned drawing under their father. Hendrick and Marten then continued their studies and learned painting under the prominent history painter Frans Floris. Hendrick and his two brothers registered in 1551 as free masters of the local Guild of Saint Luke. The youngest of his brothers, Willem, died before 1564 while Marten became a prominent genre painter.

It is certain that Hendrick travelled to Italy. Scholars disagree about the timing of his stay in Italy. Some place it before 1551, the year in which he became a master of the Guild, while others place it between 1551 and 1555, the date on which he got married. In Italy he made many drawings of mountain views, buildings and cityscapes, which he later used in his works. Based on his known drawings of Italian cities, he likely spent time in Rome, Florence and Naples.

Hendrick is only mentioned again in the records of the Antwerp Guild in 1557 when a certain Cornelis Janssens is enrolled as his pupil. After that, there is no trace of him in the period between 1557 and 1582. It is only in 1585 that his name reappears in the Guild records. He did not leave Antwerp as some scholars have suggested, but remained in Antwerp as is evidenced by various real estate transactions in which he was involved. These transactions also demonstrate that the artist was affluent. Scholars do not yet understand why almost no works can be attributed to the artist for about 30 years until 1580s when he created a large number of signed and dated paintings and drawings.

As a good painter of landscapes, his master Frans Floris and his brother Marten often invited him to paint the landscapes in his compositions.

He married Paesschyn Suys in the Saint James Church in Antwerp on 2 July 1555. The couple had three sons named Gillis, Hans and Hendrick who all became painters.

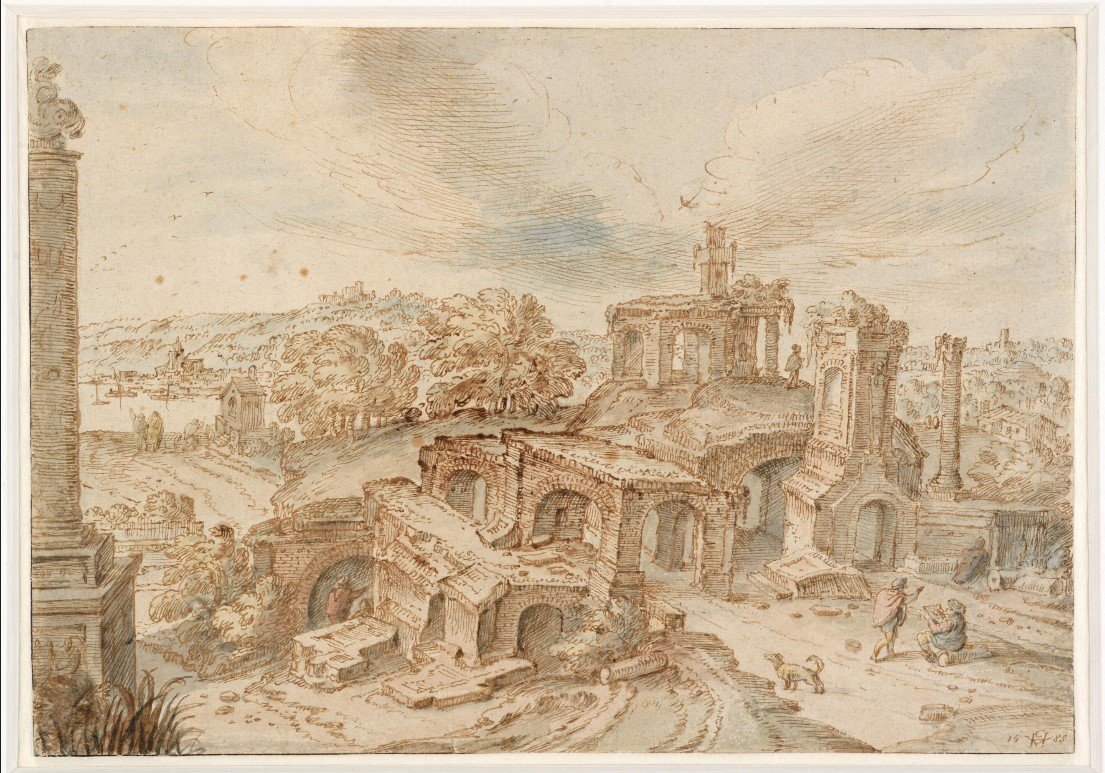
Landscape with ruins and a draughtsman

The date of death of Hendrik van Cleve is not known. A deed dated 26 January 1590 relating to the sale by van Cleve of the home of his late brother Marten demonstrates he must have lived beyond that date. It is believed he did not live beyond 1595.

== Work ==
=== General ===
Hendrik van Cleve is now primarily known as a good draughtsman since many of his drawings have been preserved. This may suggest that he was more prolific as a draughtsman than as a painter despite the fact that he is always referred to as a painter in the records of the Antwerp Guild. The oeuvre of the artist is still not well understood and new scholarship has led to revision of the works attributed to the artist. His earliest dated work, an oval portrait of a man with a vague landscape in the background, dates from 1582. This drawing is also the only portrait in his entire oeuvre.

Hendrick van Cleve was a landscape artist. He created topographical views as well as imaginary landscapes. His landscapes are in the Italianising style and typically depict wide views with ruins that may or may not be entirely imaginary. The ruins are usually a compilation of characteristic elements from classical architecture. Some are based on existing ruins which can be identified. Others are completely fabricated constructions. Antiquating elements such as fragments of antique sculptures, caryatids, columns, half-columns, obelisks or Egyptian sphinxes are placed here and there in the landscape. He often added sixteenth-century buildings around the archaeological structures. All these elements were placed in a fantastic landscape where the horizon is invariably formed by some majestic mountains or a view over the sea. A group of travelers often appears in the foreground. They appear to be en route to the sites where others, pointing to all its splendor, are already amidst the ruins.

=== Prints ===
Hendrik van Cleve's drawings were used by contemporary printmakers in Antwerp as designs. Two series of prints after van Cleve's designs were published by the renowned engraver and publisher, Philips Galle. The first series, Regionem, rurium, fundormumq [ue], varii atove [read: atque] amoeni prospectus was published in 1587. It consists of 10 plates that mainly depict inaginary pastoral landscapes with ruins. Hendrik van Cleve is mentioned as the designer on each print and Philip Galle as the engraver. The second series entitled Ruinarum varii prospectus, ruriumq [ue] aliquot delineationes is undated but was likely published around the same time as the first one. The 38 prints show Mediterranean views. It is not clear who engraved this series.

== Hendrick van Cleve III and the Hendrick van Cleve III group ==
A favourite theme of various late 16th and early 17th century Flemish painters was the Tower of Babel. The subject is taken from the Book of Genesis 11:1-9. This narrates the story of the decision to build a city and a tower reaching into the heavens. The biblical character Nimrod was appointed to oversee the project's construction. This story was a rich source of subject matter for various late 16th and early 17th century Flemish painters. Their representations were inspired by the two works of 1563 by Pieter Bruegel the Elder on this subject matter (Kunsthistorisches Museum, Vienna; and Museum Boijmans Van Beuningen, Rotterdam). The story of the Tower of Babel is in essence a reflection on human impiety and hubris, a moral message already implicit in both Bruegel's paintings.

In the past many compositions depicting the Towers of Babel were attributed to Hendrick van Cleve III. However, only three representations of the Tower of Babel can be attributed to him in a more or less secure way:

- a monogrammed and dated drawing (1584) in the Statens Museum in Copenhagen;
- a painting sold at Christie's London on 10 July 2002 (lot 19) as 'Circle of Abel Grimmer', which shares many similarities with the drawing in the Statens Museum; and
- a painting sold as by "Abel Grimmer's circle" at Sotheby's London on 18 April 2002 London (lot 7).
Representations by Hendrick van Cleve III

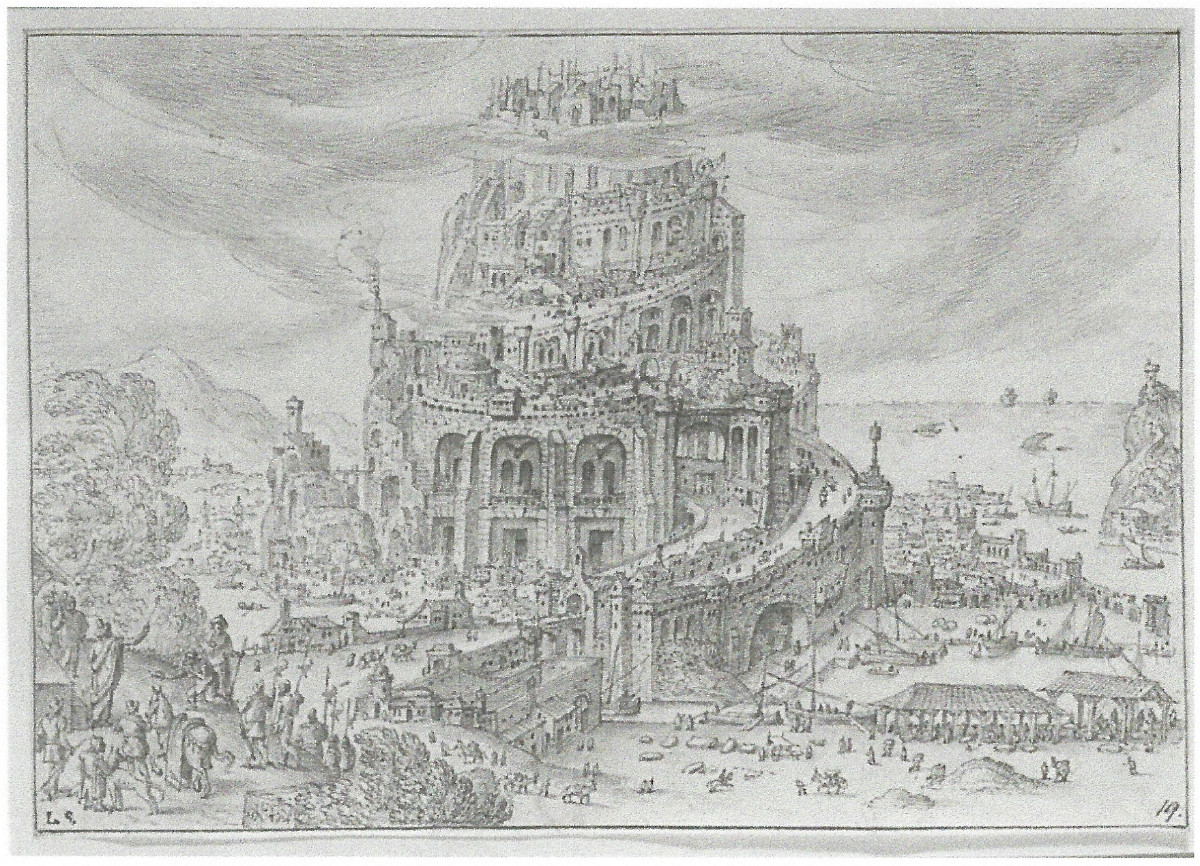
Drawing in the Statens Museum

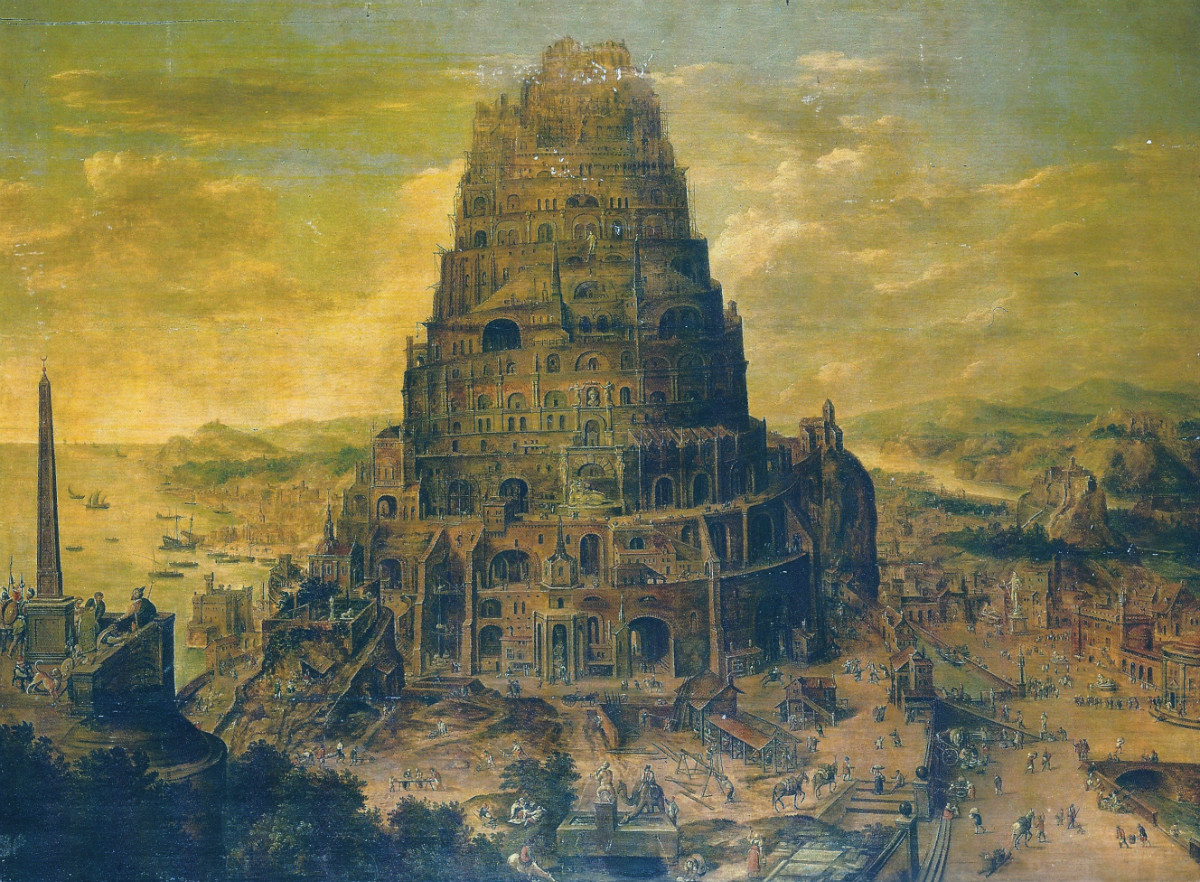
Christie's sale of 10 July 2002

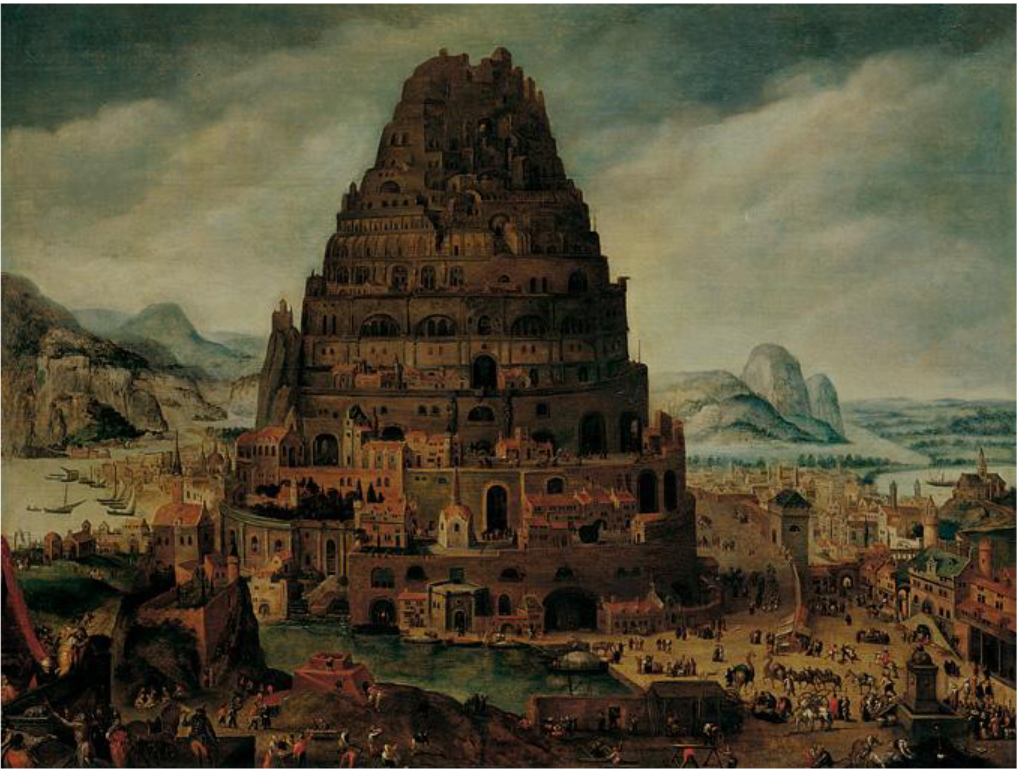
Sotheby's sale of 18 April 2002

The drawing and two paintings show the characteristics of Hendrik van Cleve's interpretation and visualization of the parable of the Tower of Babel. The composition in all three is similar in that the tower placed in the middle and the large driveway starting at the front. The Tower structure is cone-shaped and the driveway swings to the top in a spiral. These elements reprise traditional representations which were widely used for this theme in the Middle Ages. At the same time van Cleve shows inventiveness in both the depiction of the Tower and the city in the background. He pays a lot of attention to the ornamentation of the Tower. The city in the background is richly decorated with basilicas and castles placed amidst the houses. Mannerism's interest in creating imaginary city panoramas is clearly present as well as ts fascination with the Arab world as is evident from the attire of the figures wearing turbans, the mosque and the symbol of the crescent moon. Babel was often identified with Cairo in the Middle Ages. On the left side of the foreground King Nimrod with his soldiers and the architects are depicted. The other figures in the foreground are painted with such precision that they can be identified as a man or a woman. Hendrick van Cleve distributes the other figures evenly throughout the foreground and often incorporates playful scenes. The landscape in the background has the typical characteristics of the world landscape of the 16th century and consists of rocky mountains and a meandering river in the distance.

The typical elements of van Cleve's drawing and paintings of the Tower of Babel are not present in the large body of compositions of the Tower of Babel that have traditionally been attributed to van Cleve. It is now believed that the latter were the work of unidentified painters active in Antwerp in the period between 1580 and 1600. These painters, who share other characteristics have been named "the Hendrick van Cleve III group". About 50 works have been attributed to the group.

In terms of composition, the works of the Hendrick van Cleve III group can be divided into two groups:

- in the first group, two roads lead to the tower: the one on the left recalls a Roman aqueduct, the one on the right passes through a triumphal arch. The Tower has a circular base. An example is the panel of the Hamburger Kunsthalle.
- In the second group, two roads intersect X-shaped just in front of the Tower. The Tower has a square base. For example, the panel of the Kröller-Muller Museum in Otterlo and the copper painting in the collection of Fondation Custodia in Paris.
Works in The Hendrick van Cleve III Group

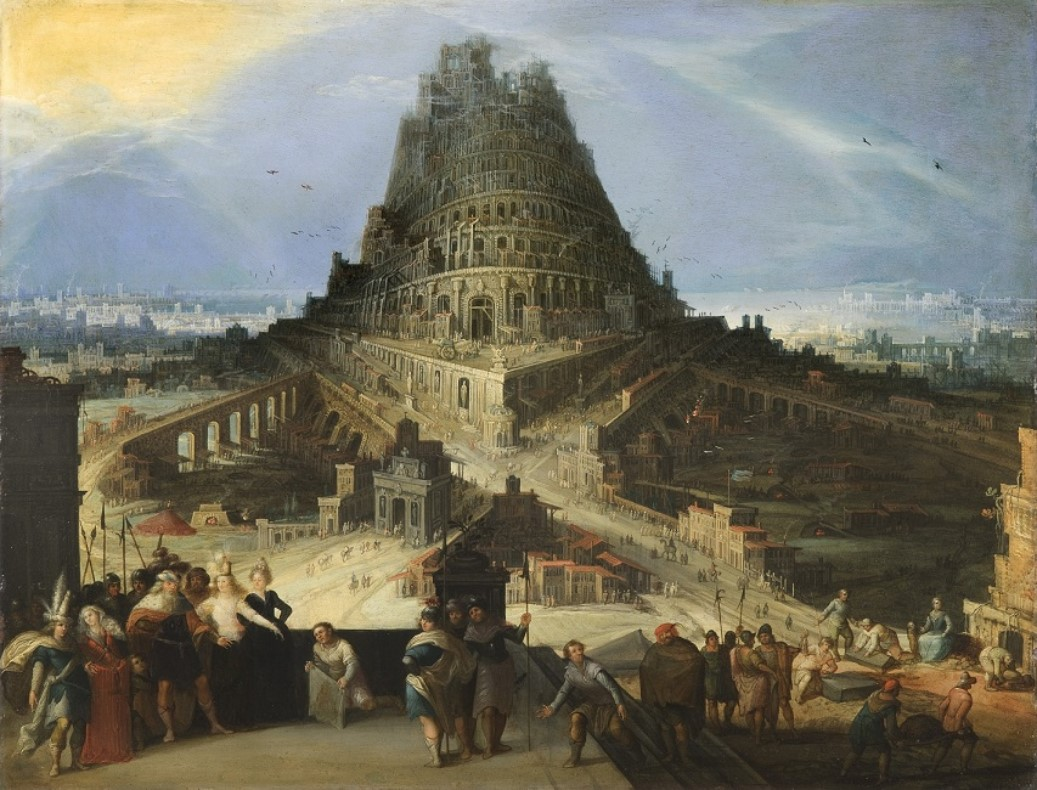
Work in Fondation Custodia

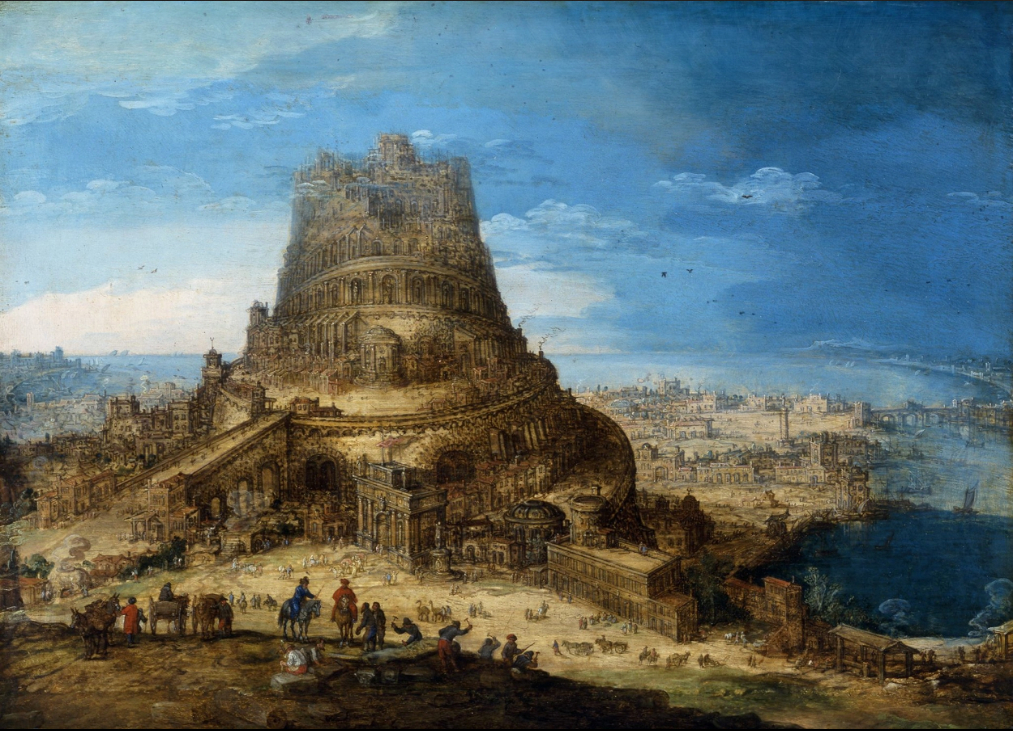
Work in Hamburger Kunsthalle

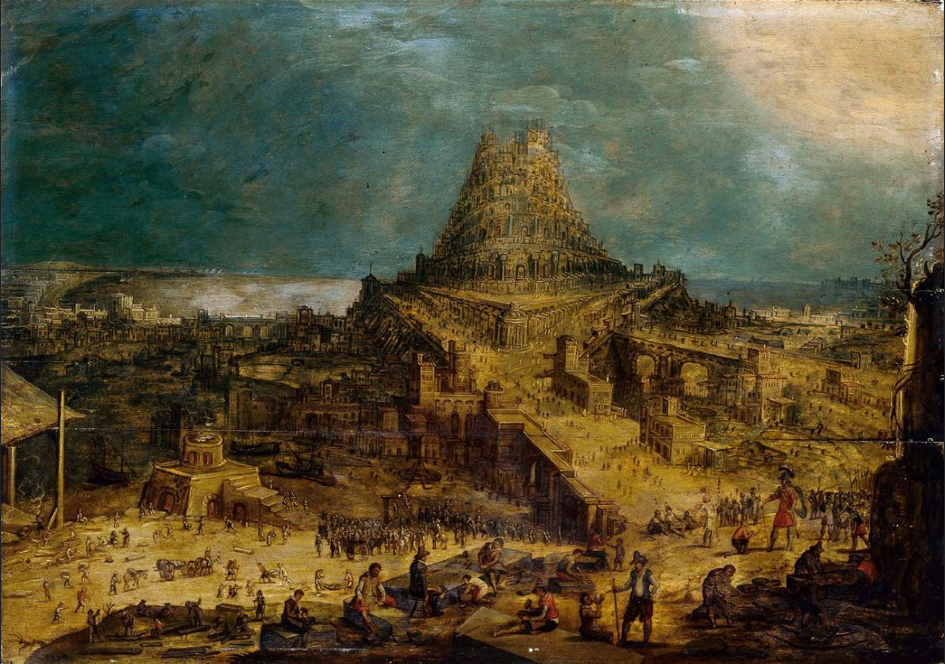
Auctioned by Lempertz on 18 November 2006

Typical of the Hendrick van Cleve III group is the interest in architecture which was a feature of 16th century Mannerism. This is expressed in the depiction of a mishmash of Flemish architectural styles and classical elements such as aqueducts, half-columns, palazzos, triumphal arches, circular arches, sculptures and so on. They also had great fascination with the imaginary city of Babel. In the background there is invariably a city with smoking chimneys. In the foreground are numerous figures who are busy building the Tower. The perspective is generally exaggerated to make the Tower more impressive. The flip side of this is that the perspective is not correct and it appears that the viewer is looking at the tower from below.

== Selected works of Hendrick van Cleve ==
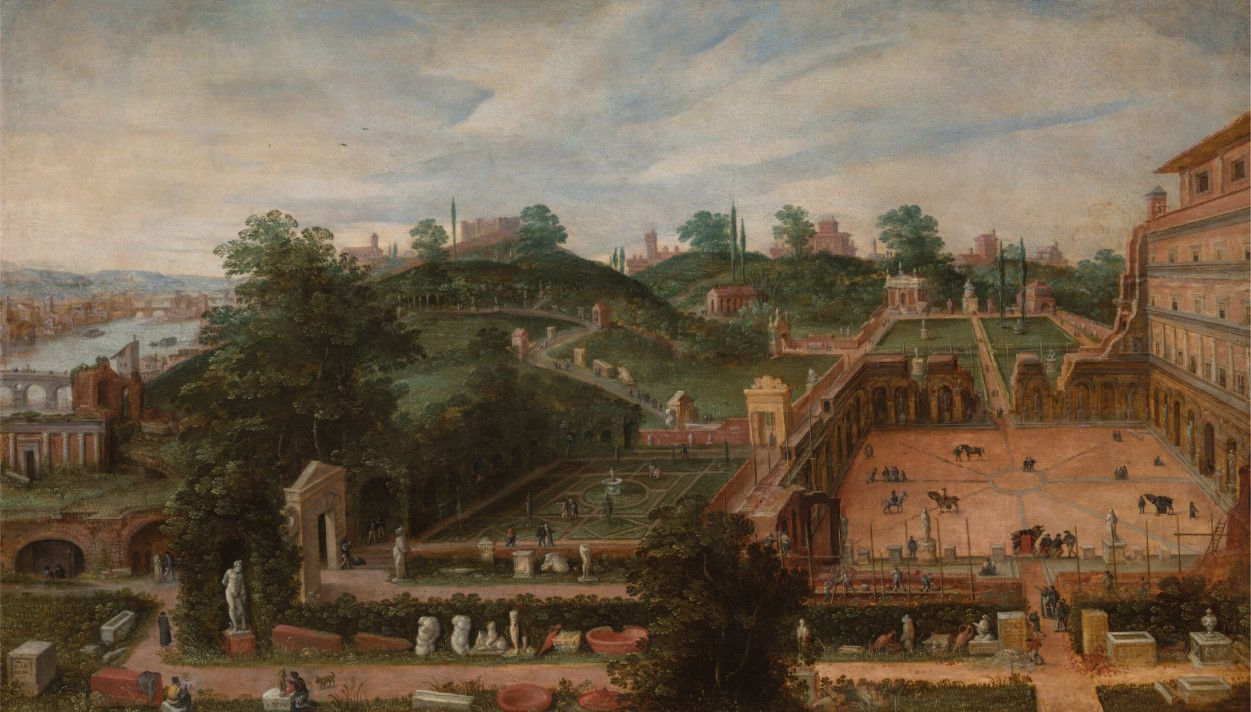
The Sculpture Garden of Cardinal Cesi

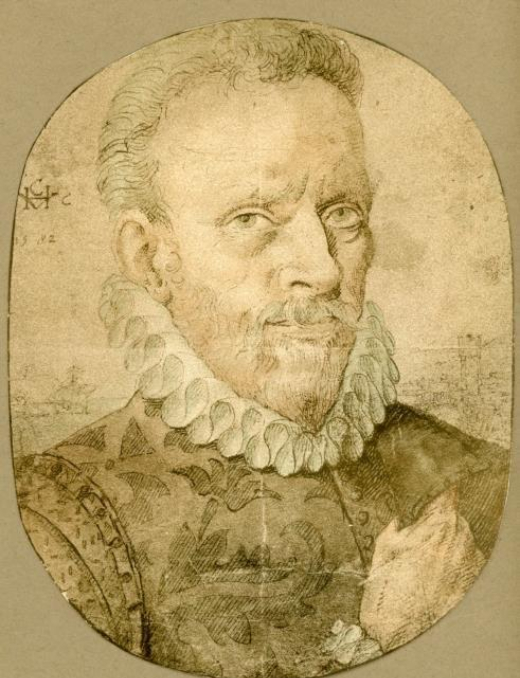
Portrait of a man

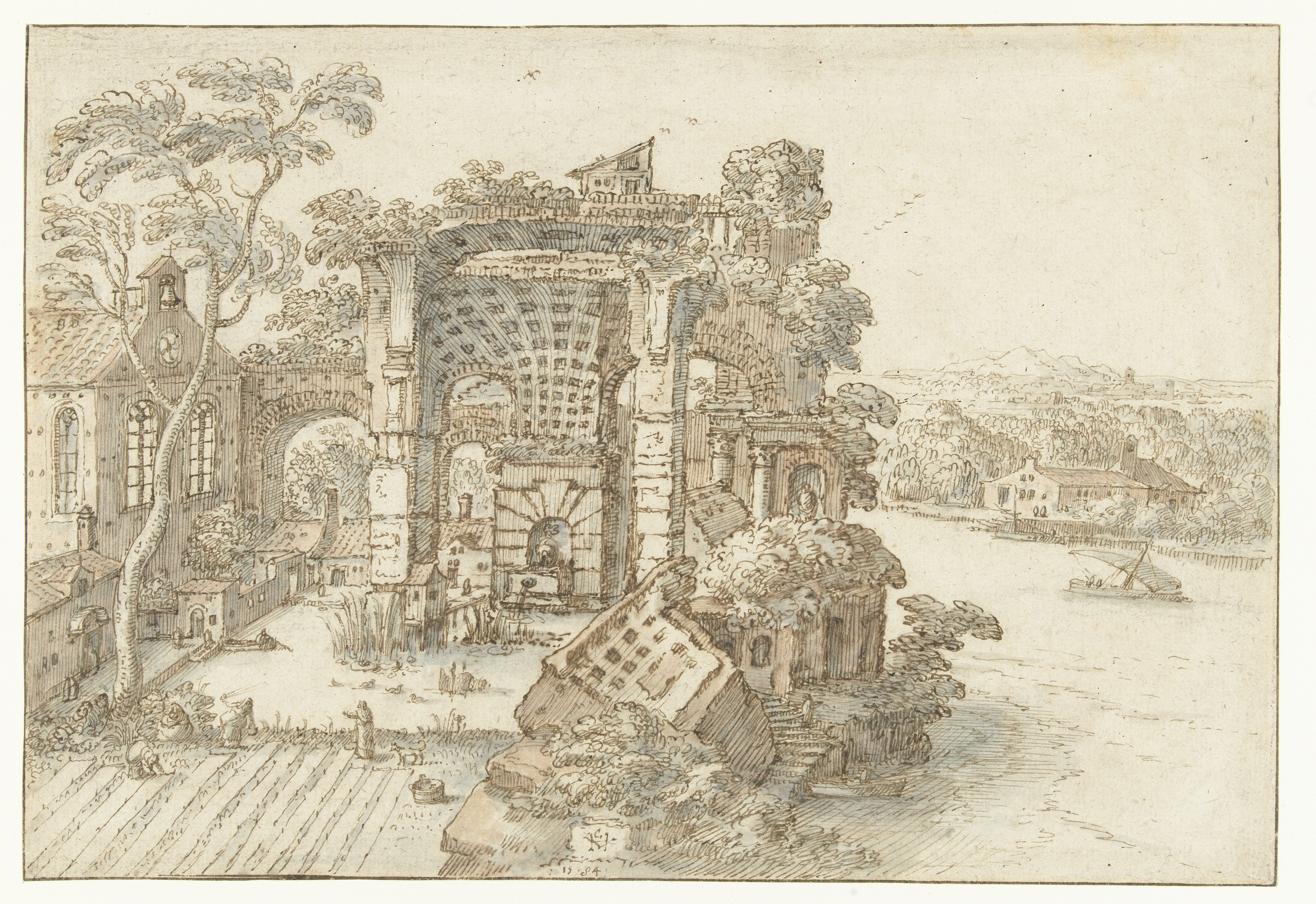
Ruins near a wide river

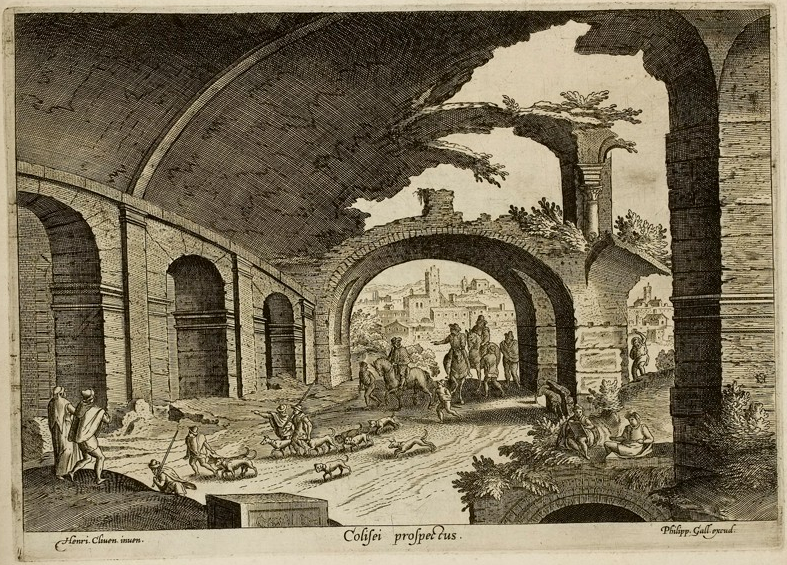
Interior of the Coloseum, from Ruinarum Varii Prospectus Ruriumque Aliquot Delineationes
