= Hendrik Gijsmans =

Flemish painter

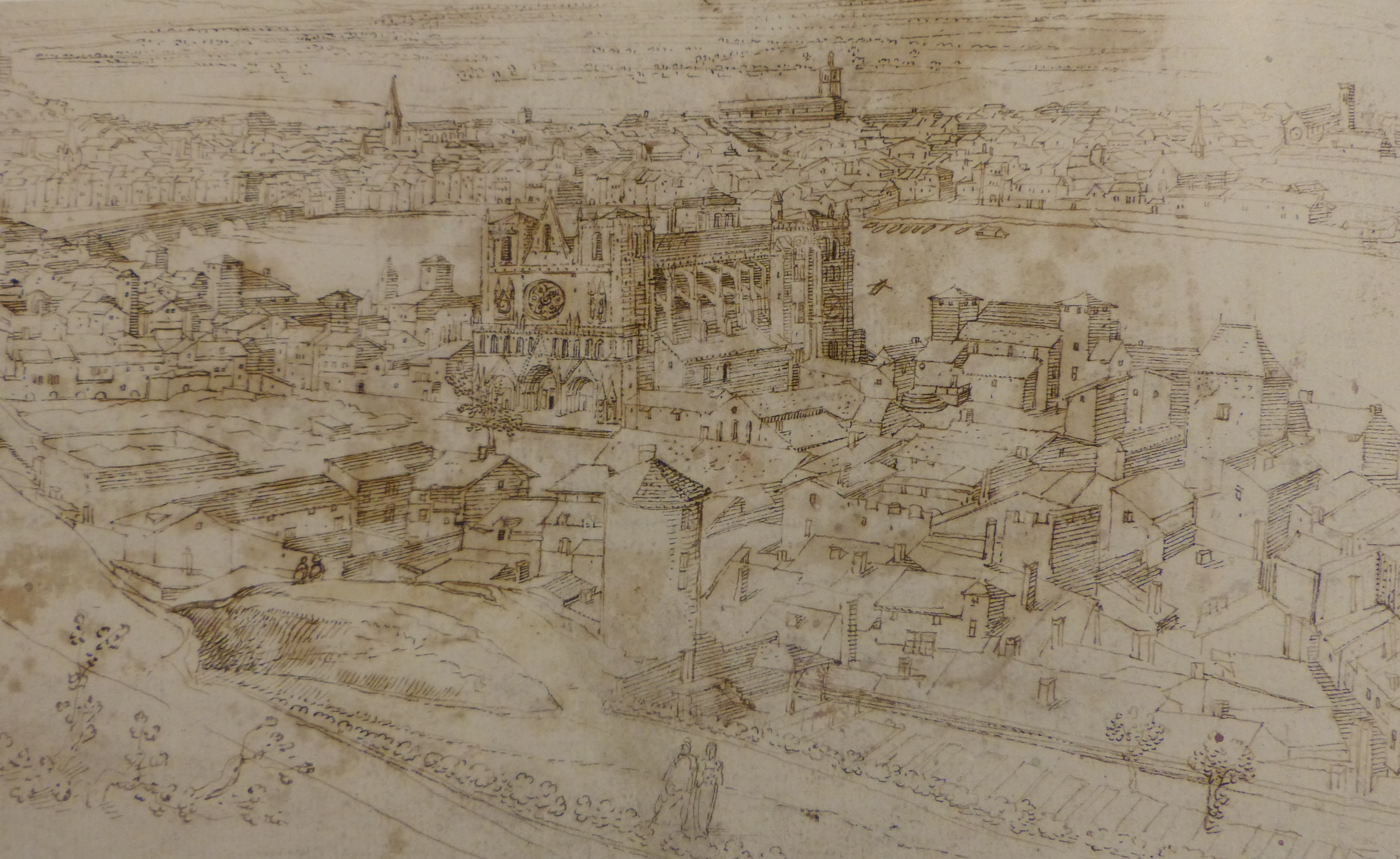
View of Lyon with Saint John's Cathedral

Hendrik Gijsmans or Egidius Gijsmans (c. 1552 in Mechelen – c. 1611/12 in Frankenthal) was a Flemish painter, draftsman, tapestry designer and mayor. After training in his native Mechelen, he moved to Antwerp where he probably worked in the workshop of Gillis Mostaert. As a Protestant he left Antwerp after the fall of the city to the Spanish in 1585. He settled in Frankenthal in 1586 where he joined a large group of other Flemish émigré artists. He later became the mayor of Frankenthal. The artist's work has only recently been rediscovered after he was identified with an anonymous artist referred to as Anonymous Fabriczy of whom a collection of about 50 drawings are held in the Staatsgalerie Stuttgart.

== Life ==
Hendrik Gijsmans is believed to have been born in Mechelen. After training in his native Mechelen, he moved to Antwerp where he probably worked in the workshop of Gillis Mostaert.

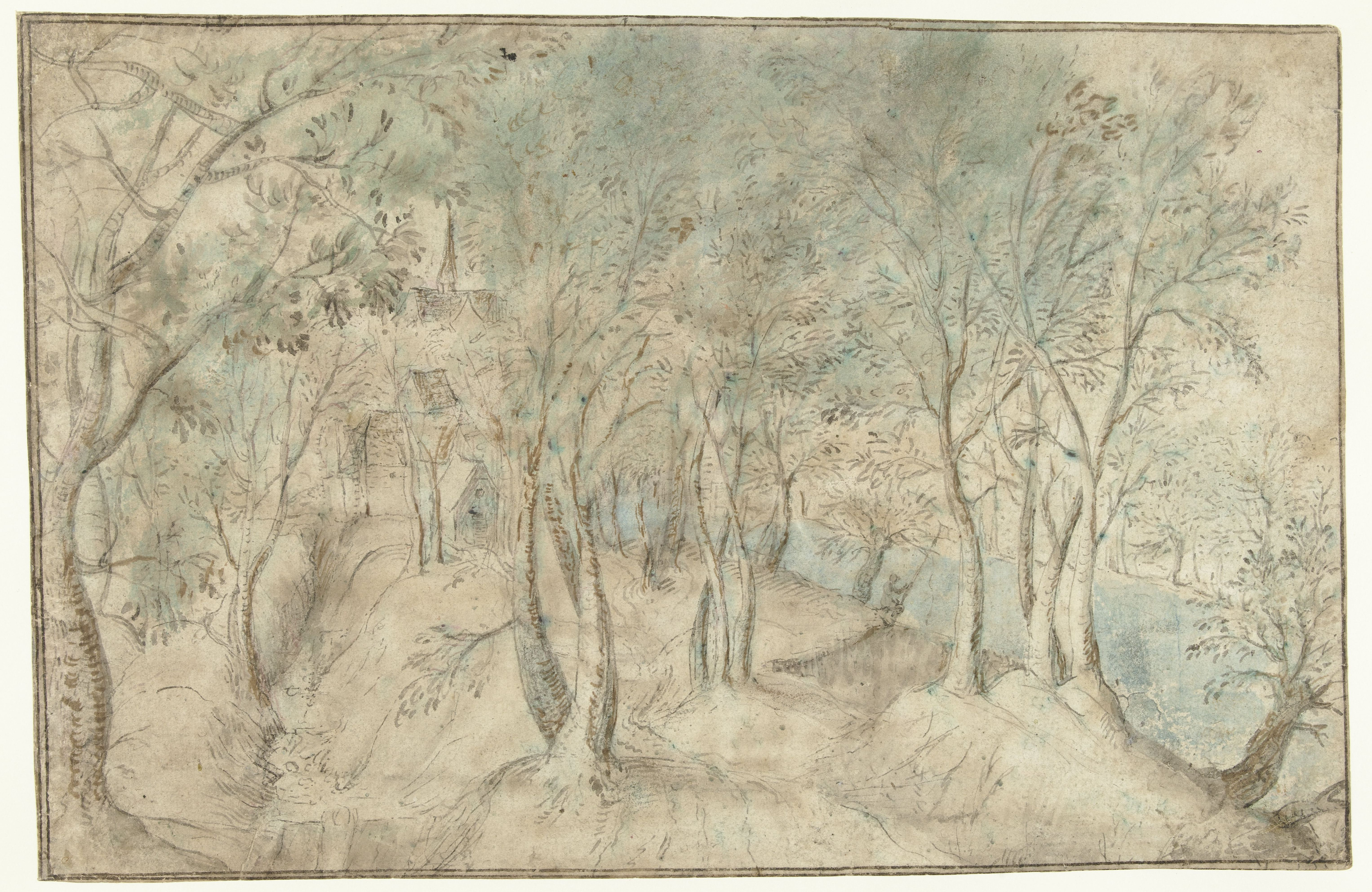
View of a village near a river

He is known to have travelled to Milan and Rome where he drew topographical views around 1570. He also created topographical drawings of some of the places that he visited during his trip to and from Italy including from the Rhône region and Lyon.

He became a member of the Antwerp Guild of Saint Luke in 1580, a citizen of the city in 1581 en was still documented in the city in 1585. He left the Southern Netherlands after the fall of Antwerp in 1585. He moved to Frankenthal in 1586 where he was a member of a large community of Flemish artists and merchants who had also emigrated from Flanders. Many of the Flemish artists who moved to Frankenthal were landscape painters. They were later referred to as the school of Frankenthal. The school of Frankenthal included the painters Gillis van Coninxloo, Pieter Schoubroeck, Anton Mirou and Hendrik van der Borcht the elder and the latter's son. In Frankenthal these artists could count on Flemish art dealers such as Cornelis Caymox who had settled there earlier and had built a network of patrons for Flemish art. Gijsmans and his son are recorded as having supplied Caymox with paintings on cloth.

Gijsmans was successful and thrived in his adopted new home and became the mayor of Frankenthal in 1609/1610. He may have been the teacher of Anton Mirou, another Flemish émigré artist. He remained in Frankenthal until his death in 1611–1612.

== Work ==
Hendrik Gijsmans was a painter and draftsman of landscapes and a tapestry designer. None of his paintings have been preserved. There are records in 1588 of the presence of three paintings (including two views of Antwerp) and in 1595 another three works (a view of the Castle Garden in Brussels and two sieges of Antwerp) in the Kunstkammer in Dresden where they are mentioned until 1603. A Viennese inventory dated after 1619 mentions another siege of Antwerp and three landscapes on parchment.

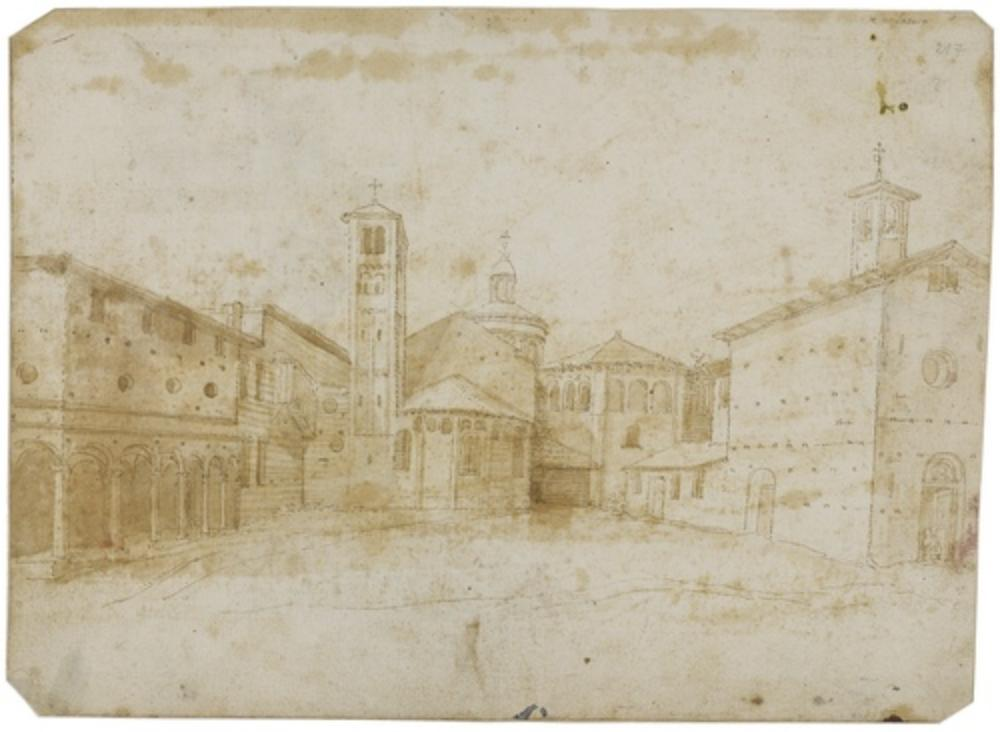
View of San Vittore al Corpo and San Martino in Milan

Hendrik Gijsmans is now known only through his drawings. The art historian Cornelius von Fabriczy published in 1893 for the first time fifty views of Flanders, France and Italy which were in the collection of the Staatsgalerie Stuttgart. The works were ascribed to an anonymous artist who was given the notname Anonymous Fabriczy. The unknown artist was identified with Hendrik Gijsmans by Stijn Alsteens (Hans Buijs, Véronique Mathot, Willem Schellinks, Paysages de France: dessinés par Lambert Doomer et les artistes hollandais et flamands des XVIe et XVIIe siècles, Fondation Custodia, 2008, pp. 221–226). This was thanks to the discovery of a drawing representing Saint-Vallier in the Rhone Valley, which had been acquired by the Louvre Museum and was datable to 1567 or later. This drawing carried the inscription Henrick Ghÿsm : F. The drawing in the Louvre turned out to be a first version of one of the views preserved in the Staatsgalerie Stuttgart. This identification led to the attribution to Gijsmans of almost all the 50 drawings in the Staatsgalerie formerly ascribed to Anonymous Fabriczy. Part of the drawings of Stuttgart were likely part of a notebook some of the pages of which have become dispersed.

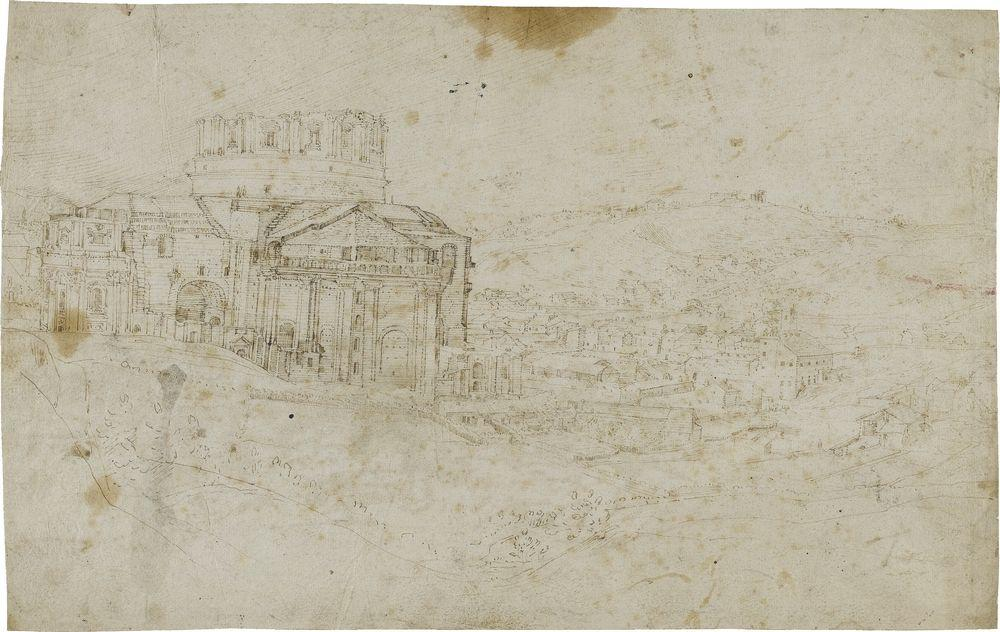
View of the St. Peter's Basilica in Rome under construction

The Flemish origins of the author of the drawings in Stuttgart are not only confirmed by the inclusion among the drawings of views of cities in the Southern Netherlands such as Antwerp, Dendermonde, Brussels and Huy, but also by a style similar to the refined graphics of Pieter Bruegel the Elder. The works show Gijsmans to be one of Bruegel's principal followers. His drawings show the artist's considerable talent for representing nature as well as architecture.

Some of the Italian views, made in Rome and Milan, can be dated between 1565 and 1568. It is therefore likely that the views of France date from shortly before or shortly after these years and were made during Gijsmans' outward journey to, or his return from, Italy.
