= Anton Mirou =

Flemish painter

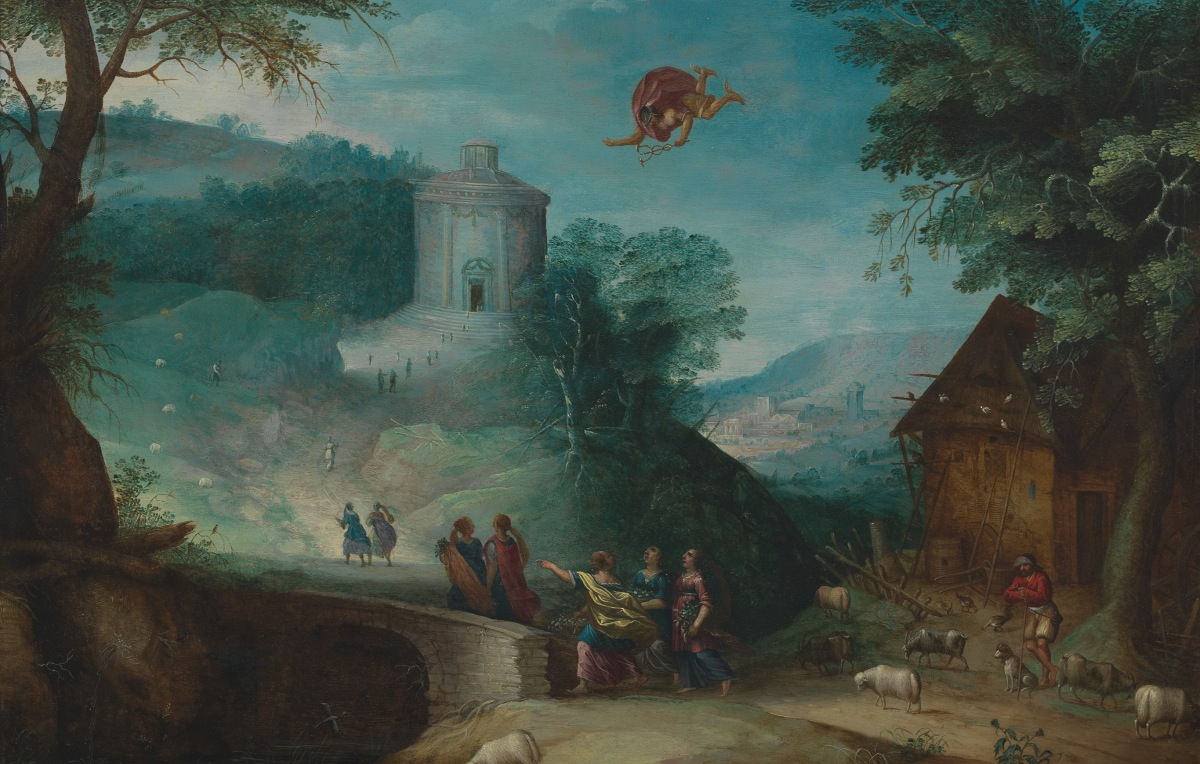
Landscape with Mercury and Herse

Antoine, or Anton Mirou (1578 – 1621/1627), was a Flemish Baroque landscape painter of the Frankenthal school. He is known for his wooded and rocky landscapes and landscapes with populated villages. He was also a topographical draftsman whose views were widely disseminated through prints.

== Life ==
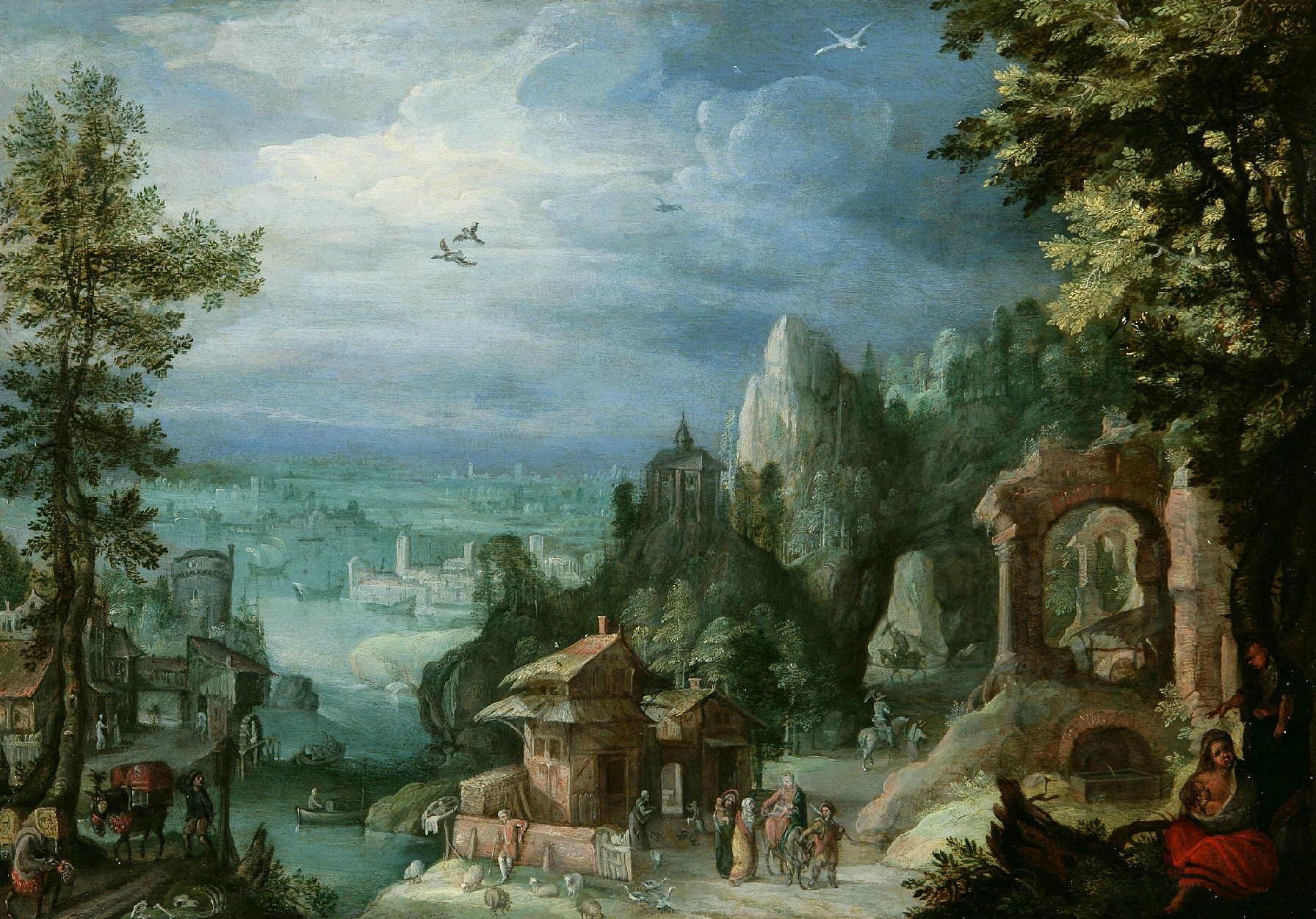
Extensive Landscape with the Rest on the Flight into Egypt

Anton Mirou was born in Antwerp where he was baptized on 4 May 1578 in the Cathedral of Our Lady. His father, Henricus Mirou, was an apothecary. The family must have been Protestant as they left Antwerp in 1586 after the Fall of Antwerp. The family moved to Frankenthal where a younger brother was born. Anton Mirou made a declaration in Frankenthal in 1602 that he was 24 years of age.

On stylistic grounds it is believed that Mirou trained in Frankenthal under the prominent Flemish landscape artist Gillis van Coninxloo who resided there from 1588 to 1595. Another Flemish painter active in Germany called Hendrik Gijsmans was possibly also his teacher.

In 1602 in Frankenthal her married Susanneke Jaspersdr. van Conincxloo. According to an unknown source, he returned to Antwerp in 1620, where he possibly died. He must have died after 1621 and before 8 April 1627 as on the latter date his wife is mentioned as widow.

== Work ==
He painted landscapes and is considered a member of the school of Frankenthal, which included the painters Gillis van Coninxloo, Pieter Schoubroeck, and Hendrik van der Borcht the elder and his son, Hendrik van der Borch II.

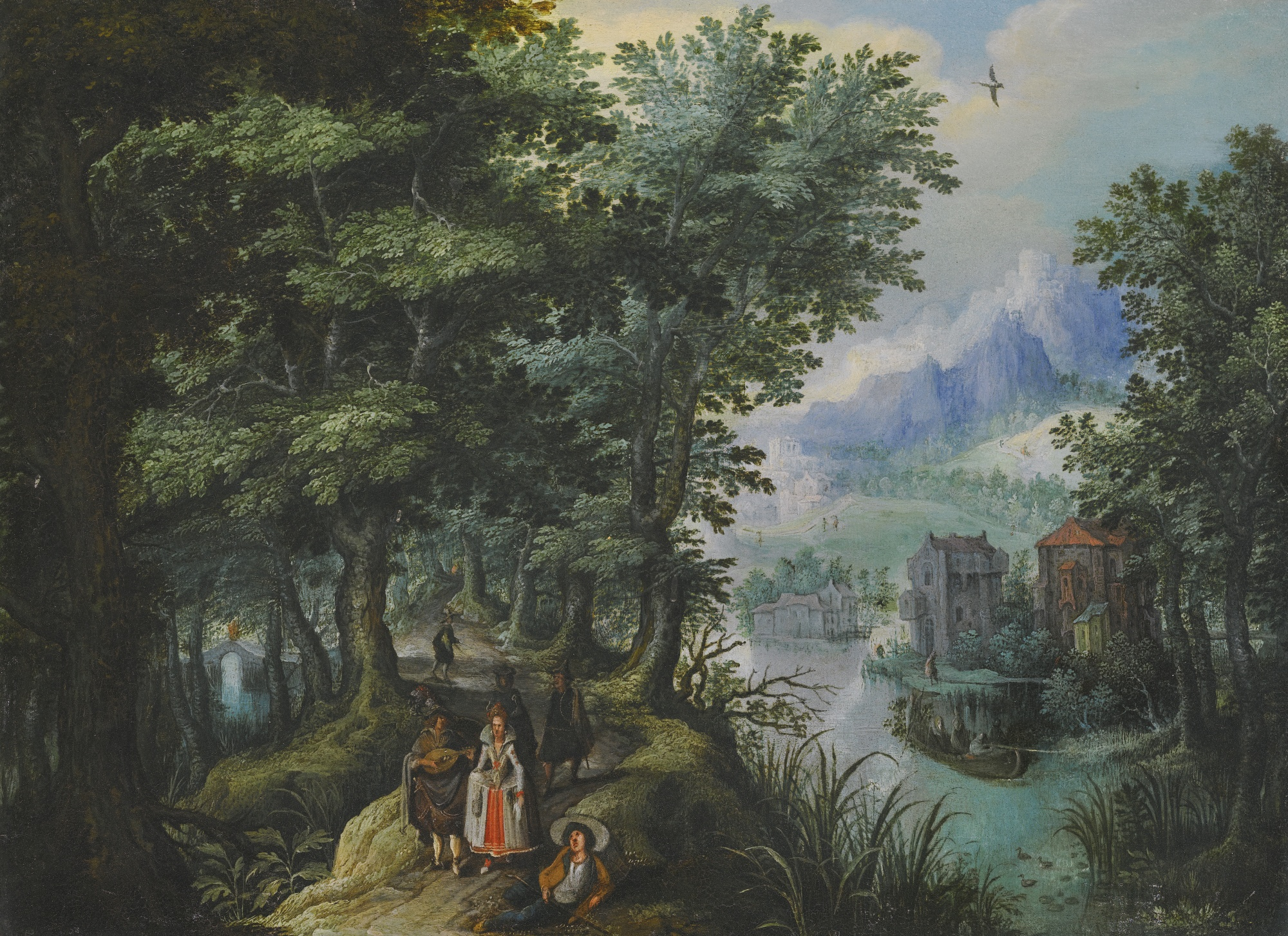
River landscape with elegant figures on a path

A majority of Mirou's landscapes are distinguished from those of his contemporaries by the presence of richly dressed figures that populate the woody paths. These figures often seem ill matched with their surroundings. In the River landscape with elegant figures on a path (an oil on copper offered at Sotheby's London on 3 July 2013) a magnificently dressed young lady is serenaded by a lute-playing gentleman while they stroll on a path along which there are several beggars.

His early landscapes were influenced by his presumed master Gillis van Coninxloo. These landscapes depict abundant trees or shrubs, craggy mountains, waterfalls and rock formations and complex paths. After about 1614 Mirou seems to have undergone the influence of another artist of Flemish descent active in Frankenthal called Pieter Schoubroeck. Mirou started from that time to paint village landscapes populated with many figures.

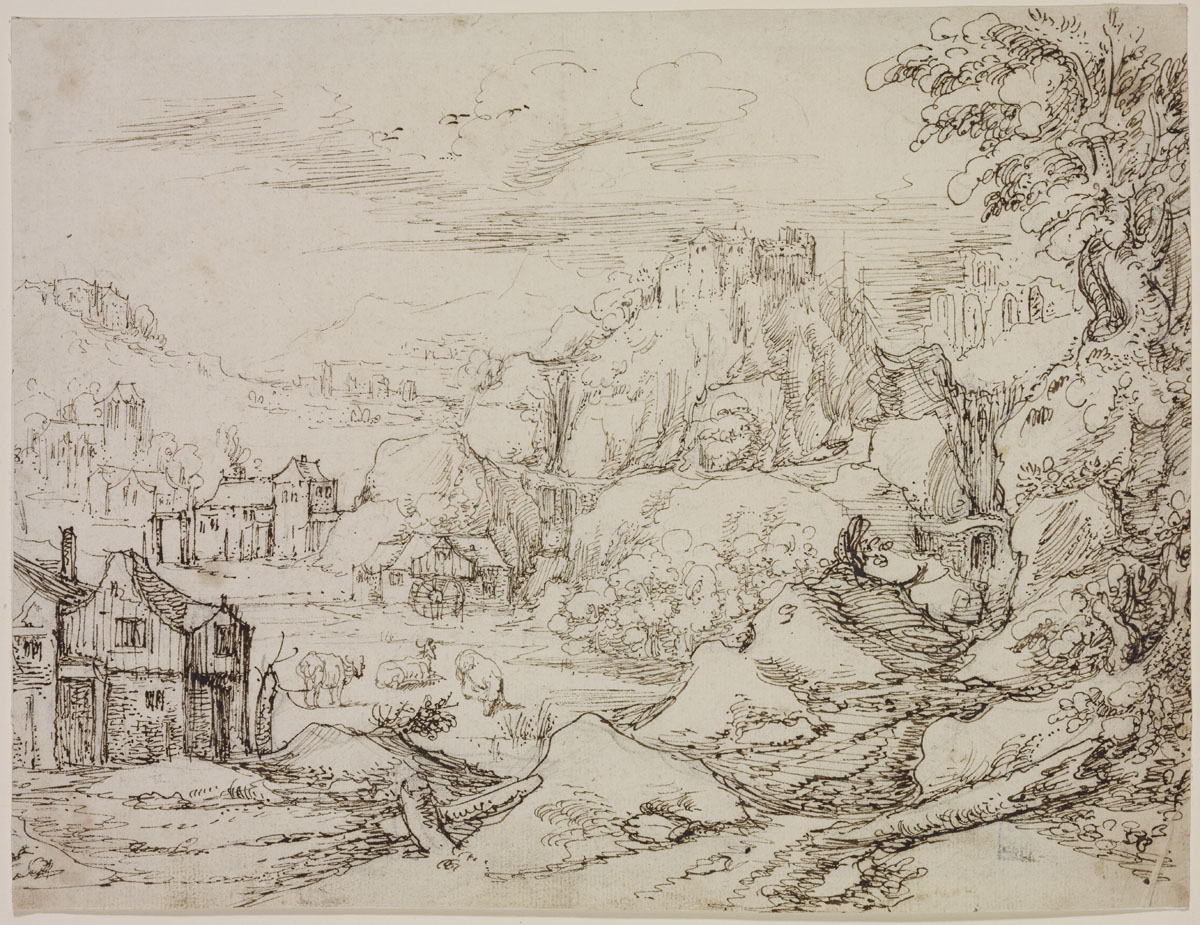
Landscape with water mill, castle and buildings

Mirou had a strong interest in topographical drawings. A series of 26 plates of his views of Bad Schwalbach were turned into prints by Matthias Merian and published in an album entitled Novae quaedem ac paganae regiunculae circa acidulas Swalbacenses delineatae per Antonium Mirulem in aes vero incisae per Mathae Merianem (Some new and rural village views around the sour springs of Schwalbach, drawn by Anton Mirou but cut in copper by Matthias Merian, 1620) (Hollstein Dutch and Flemish Etchings, Engravings, and Woodcuts, ca. 1450–1700, volume 14, nos. 1–26 on page 52).This publication of prints contributed to the images' wide circulation throughout the low countries. Some of the original drawings of Mirou are in collections in Budapest and elsewhere and bear the original notes made in Dutch by Mirou himself. Many of these drawings invite comparison with the Small Landscapes series, engraved and published in Antwerp between 1559 and 1561 by Hieronymus Cock.

Mirou's works are held in the Prado, the Rijksmuseum, the Szépművészeti Múzeum, the Bavarian State Painting Collections, the National Gallery Prague, and the Historical Museum of the Pfalz.
