= Hendrik van der Borcht the elder =

Flemish-German engraver (1583–1651)

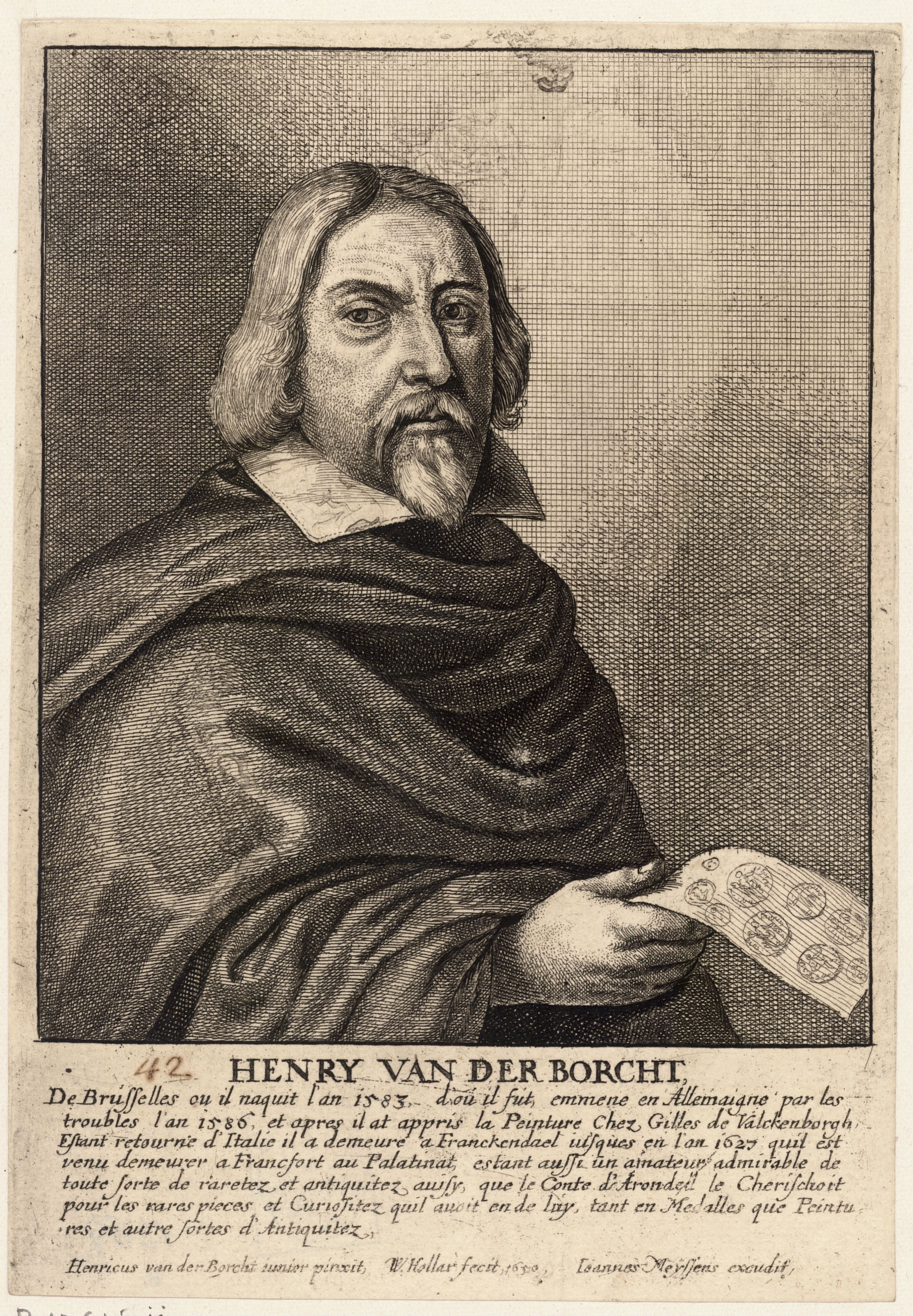
Hendrik van der Borcht by Wenceslaus Hollar in Het Gulden Cabinet

Hendrik van der Borcht the Elder or Hendrick van der Borcht the Elder (1583 - 26 July 1651) was a Flemish-German engraver and painter of portraits, still lifes of antiquities, flowers and fruit and landscapes. He was also an eminent antiquarian. He was mainly active in Germany to which his family had emigrated for religious reasons.

== Life ==
Hendrik van der Borcht was born in Brussels as the son of Hendrick and Elisabeth Notemans. His father was in 1581 councilman of the city council of Brussels. This council was controlled by Calvinists since the end of 1577 following an uprising against his Catholic sovereign, King Philip II of Spain. It is not clear whether his father was part of the radical Calvinists who had rejected Francis, Duke of Anjou, as the new sovereign of the Low Countries.

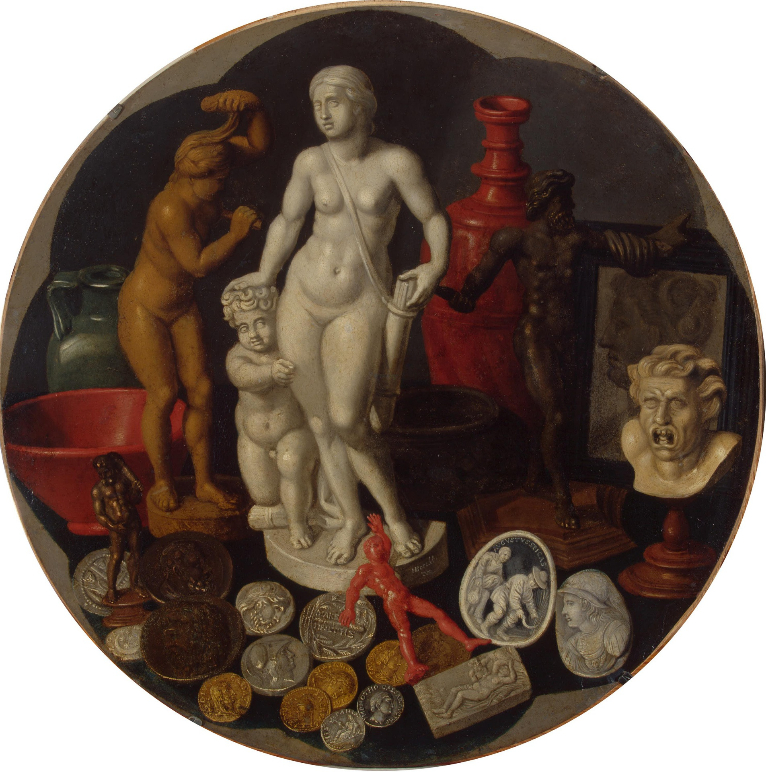
Still-life with rarity collection

Hendrik left his home country with his family in 1586 after the Fall of Antwerp when Calvinists who did not wish to convert back to Catholicism emigrated from the Southern Netherlands. It is not clear where the family resided between 1586 and the end of 1597. It is believed they were somewhere in Germany, possibly in Frankfurt or Frankenthal, which were safe havens for Calvinists and where relatives of the families van der Borcht and Noteman were already residing. On 6 November 1597 the family resurfaces again in the records when the mother Elisabeth Notemans was present in Frankenthal at the christening of Elisabeth Gijsmans, the daughter of the painter Hendrik Gijsmans. Elisabeth Notemans was the godmother. The baptismal record in Frankenthal notes that she was already a widow. She may have left the family's residence to join her relatives in Frankenthal, probably not long before the baptism, since she is not mentioned at the weddings of her brothers in Frankenthal. The family left Frankenthal for Frankfurt after two years in Frankenthal.

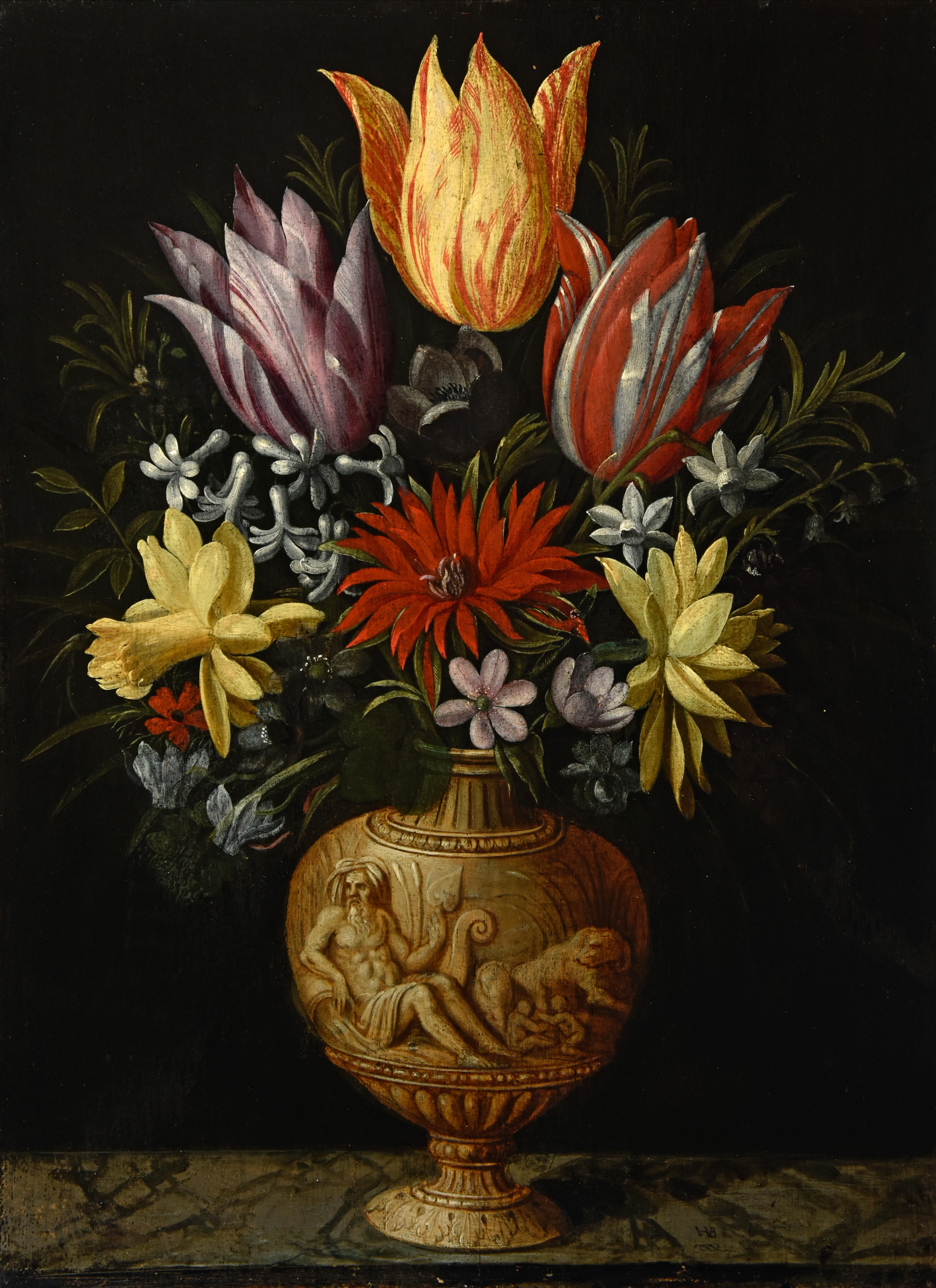
Flowers in a vase on a marble plinth

In 1598, Elisabeth Notemann married in a second marriage the likewise widowed Anton Mertens from Antwerp. Anton Mertens had made a fortune in Antwerp as a goldsmith and jeweler. After the fall of Antwerp in 1585, he had left for Frankfurt with his wife Susanna Tripmakers and the children born in Antwerp. Here he rebuilt his jewelry business and also went into private banking business. The Firma Mertens was probably one of the oldest German private banks and was to survive until 1917 when it was incorporated into today's Commerzbank. Anton Mertens was an art loving man who had commissioned various paintings from the Flemish painter Gillis van Coninxloo who was living in Frankenthal at the time. It was likely this artistic stepfather who apprenticed the young Hendrik to a painter.

Hendrik's master was the young Flemish painter Gillis van Valckenborch (1569, Antwerp - 1622, Frankfurt). Gillis van Valckenborch was the son of the painter Marten van Valckenborch (1534, Leuven - 1612, Frankfurt) and nephew of the famous painter Lucas van Valckenborch (1536, Leuven - 1597, Frankfurt). This apprenticeship likely lasted until about 1604. During this period Hendrik must have met the painter Georg Flegel, who had been a student of Lucas van Valckenborch. After completing his apprenticeship Hendrik likely went on a long study trip to Italy. He spent between 1604 and about 1610 mostly in Rome, where he trained with an expert in Antiquities (Epigraphy, Numismatics). He likely returned to Frankfurt after the death of his stepfather Anton Mertens on 5 August 1609 to deal with the inheritance. In 1611 he is recorded in Frankenthal, where he married on 28 May 1611 with Dina van Couwenberghe. His wife was the great-granddaughter of the Brussels painter Philippe van Orley, the brother of the famous Brussels painter Bernard van Orley. Hendrik lived and worked from 1611 to 1627 in the thriving Flemish colony in Frankenthal where six of his children were born of whom Hendrik the Younger became a painter.

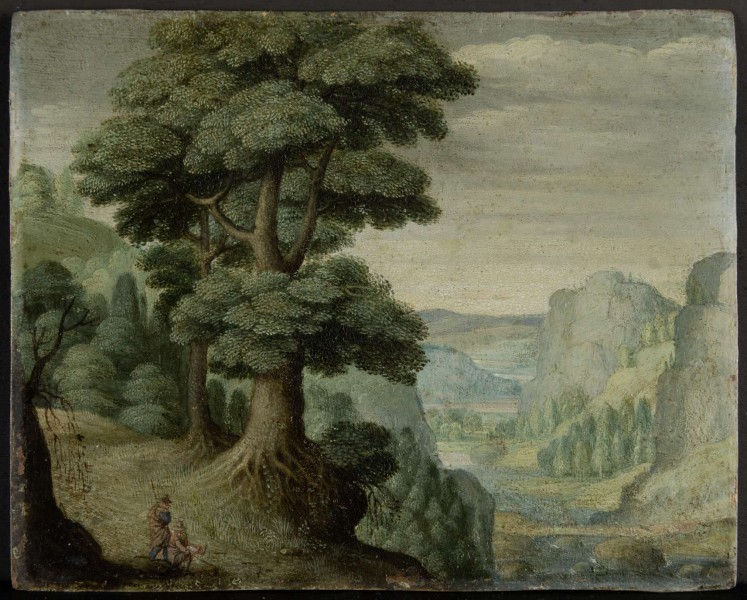
Mountain landscape with a big tree

Since he was independently rich, Hendrik could probably choose which commissions to accept. In 1613 he came into contact with the court of Heidelberg for which he created together with the Flemish-born painter Anton Mirou the illustrations for a book that commemorated the festive reception and entry of the wedding couple, Frederick V of the Palatinate and Elisabeth Stuart, the daughter of the English King Jacob I, in Frankenthal. He further worked on the decorations of the city Frankenthal on the occasion of these festivities around 4 June 1613. On this occasion he met the young English Thomas Howard, 21st Earl of Arundel, who accompanied the English Princess. Arundel was a passionate art lover and collector who probably did not miss the chance to talk to Hendrik and see his art collection brought from Italy.

At the beginning of the Thirty Years War Frankenthal was besieged by Spanish troops in 1621. In 1623, Frankenthal finally came "contractually" under the control of the Spaniards, who held Frankenthal until 1652. Most of the Flemish left the city as early as 1623, the rest followed them when the Spaniards prohibited the exercise of the Protestant worship in 1627. Hendrik also left Frankenthal in 1627 and moved with his family to Frankfurt of which he became a citizen in 1636. The Earl of Arundel visited him on a diplomatic mission in Germany and subsequently took his eldest son Hendrik into his service. In March 1638 the painter Georg Flegel died in Frankfurt. A portrait made by Hendrik shortly before his death was engraved by Sebastian Furck. Hendrik provided the print with a paean on his friend Flegel.

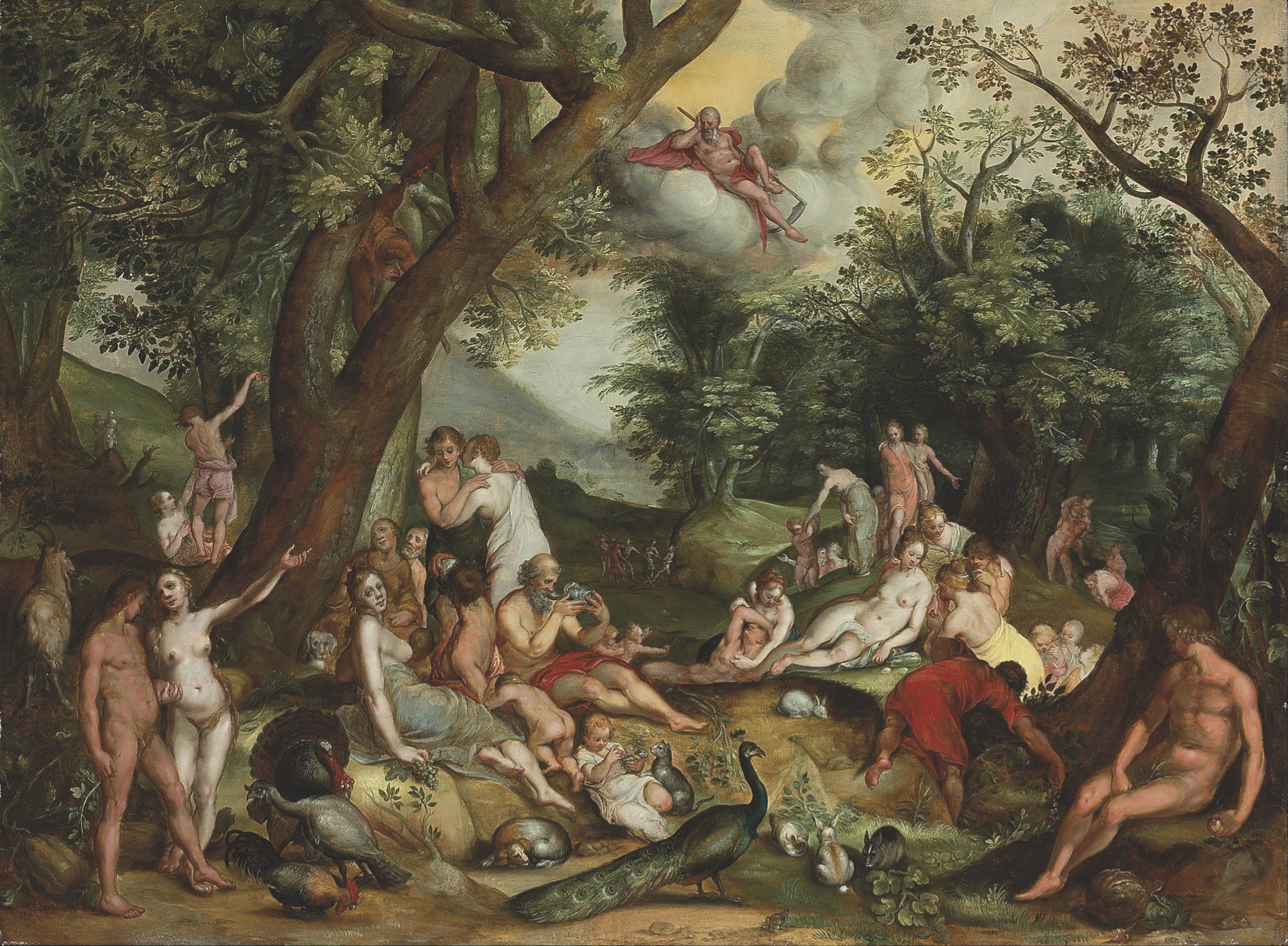
The Golden Age

Meanwhile, his wife, Dina van Couwenberghe, had given birth to three more children in Frankfurt: Anton (1628), Johann Frederick (1630) and Sebastian (1634). Hendrik trained his sons. The most talented in painting were probably the older sons Hendrik (II) and Abraham. Presumably Anton also became a painter, but died young in Frankfurt in 1658 at the age of 30 years.

Hendrik died on 26 July 1651 in Frankfurt at the age of 68 years. His widow Dina van Couwenberghe survived him by more than 15 years.

== Work ==
Van der Borcht painted portraits, still lifes of antiquities, flowers and fruit and landscapes. He was also an engraver who created 12 prints for a publication of the Entry of Frederick, Elector Palatine, with Elizabeth, Princess Royal of England, his Consort, into Frankenthal (1613).

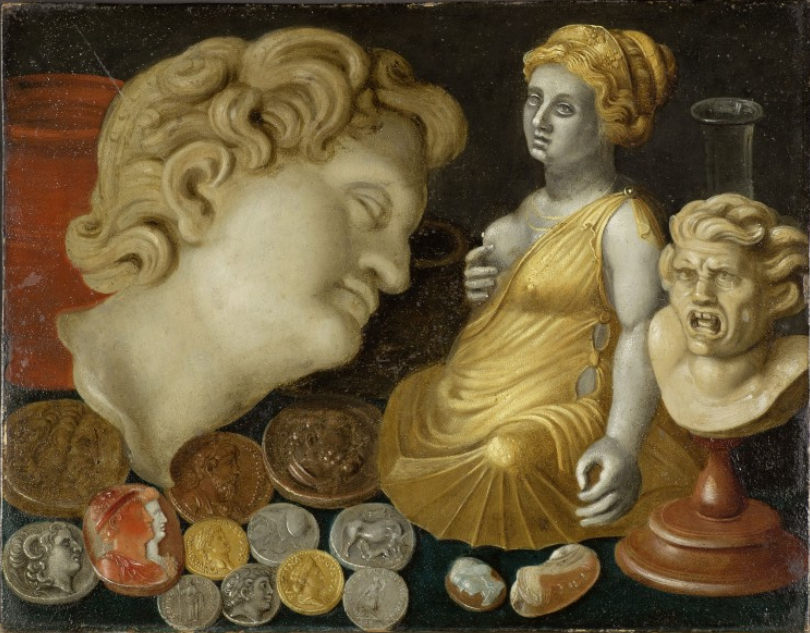
Still life with collection objects

He is considered a member of the Frankenthal school in his landscape work. The Frankenthal school is the name given to a group of Flemish painters who had emigrated from the Southern Netherlands because of the Protestant persecution and had settled in Frankenthal (Pfalz) after 1562. The representatives of the school did not have a uniform style but were thematically connected. They showed an interest in small-scale forest landscapes (mostly executed on copper plates) with historical or religious scenes. The most important representatives were Giles van Coninxloo, his pupil Pieter Schoubroeck and Anton Mirou. Van der Borcht's Mountain landscape with a big tree (Historical Museum, Frankfurt) is a small scale painting on copper. It shows a rocky river landscape dominated by a mighty tree that rises slightly to the left of the central axis. The tree stands with its visible, spreading root system slightly overhanging the edge of a ridge, which leads from the left foreground into the deep. On the right the terrain as well as the gorge and the towering mountain drop away sharply into a deep river valley. Two travelers with pointed hats and walking sticks are the only living creatures in the scene. The picture demonstrates in the landscape's layout as well as its small-figure staffage the influence of Jan Brueghel the Elder (1568-1625), who had created similar compositions in Rome around 1595.

Van der Borcht painted a few still lifes painted on copper representing collections of antique statutes, objects and coins. One (Hermitage, Leningrad) is a large composition in a circular format showing a complex collection of statues, medals, coins, vases and a bowl, against a dark green ground. A second (Historisches Museum, Frankfurt) is in horizontal format. It shows antique sculptures, coins, cameos and simple vessels distributed on a tablecloth. Several items reappear in more than one of these still lifes, such as the bust of a scowling man which is depicted in both the Frankfurt and Hermitage still lifes, and several of the classically-styled cameos. This makes it likely that the artist painted them after an actual collection, possibly his own. These still lifes of collection objects are close to the paintings of collection cabinets, which emerged shortly after 1600 in Antwerp. These Antwerp paintings featured more or less fictional art and curiosity collections.

There is also a flower still life by van der Borcht's hand. It shows tulips, hyacinths, narcissus, anemones, cyclamens and rosemary in a terra cotta vase with a classical motif placed on a marble plinth. The classical motif shows Romulus and Remus washed ashore and suckled by a she-wolf, the so-called 'Lupa Romana'.
