= Willem van den Bundel =

Dutch Golden Age painter

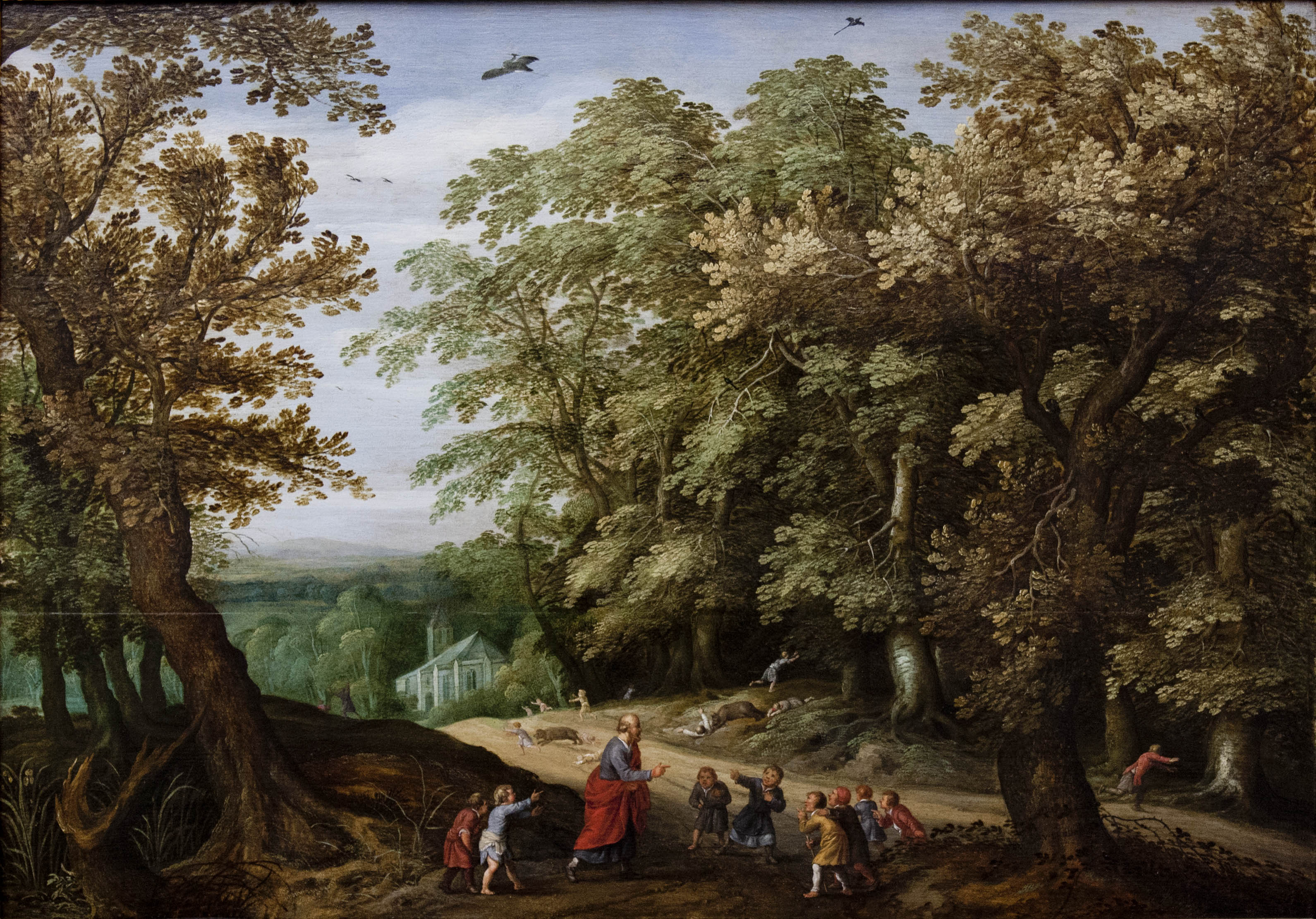
The Prophet Elisha curses the children who mocked him

Willem van den Bundel (1575–1655), was a Dutch Golden Age painter.

== Biography ==
He was born in Brussels and became a landscape painter, possibly as the pupil of Gillis van Coninxloo who was a witness at his wedding in Delft in 1600. He moved to Amsterdam 1607–1620 but was back in Delft as a paying member of the Guild of St. Luke during the years 1623–1654. His son died in Delft in 1642 and he sold works in Leiden 1644–1645.

He died in Delft.
