= Gillis Mostaert =

Flemish painter

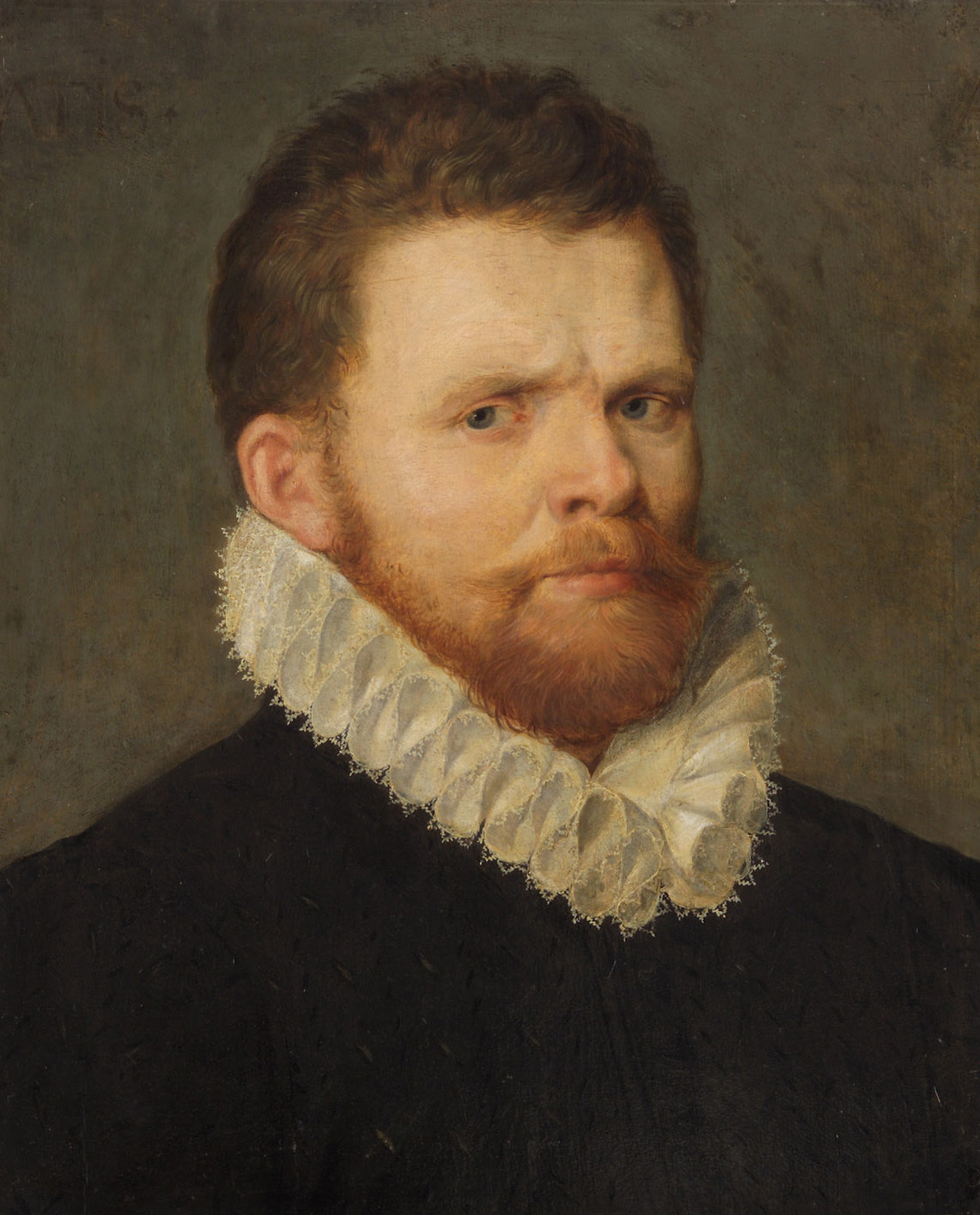
Portrait of Gillis Mostaert

Gillis Mostaert the Elder (27 or 28 November 1528 – 28 December 1598) was a Flemish Renaissance painter and draughtsman active in Antwerp in the second half of the 16th century. He was a versatile artist who worked in various genres including landscape, genre and history painting. Gillis Mostaert was known in particular for his winter landscapes and his scenes with fires and nocturnal scenes and his works in this genre were among the most sought-after pieces of his time. The artist operated a large workshop in Antwerp, which supplied works to prominent patrons. He was a regular collaborator with leading Antwerp artists of his time.

== Life ==
Gillis Mostaert was born in Hulst. According to the early artist biographer Karel van Mander Gillis Mostaert was the twin brother of the painter Frans Mostaert and the grandson of the painter Jan Mostaert. Modern scholarship casts doubt on the statement that Jan Mostaert was a relative of Gillis. Gillis’ father, also called Gillis, was a painter himself.

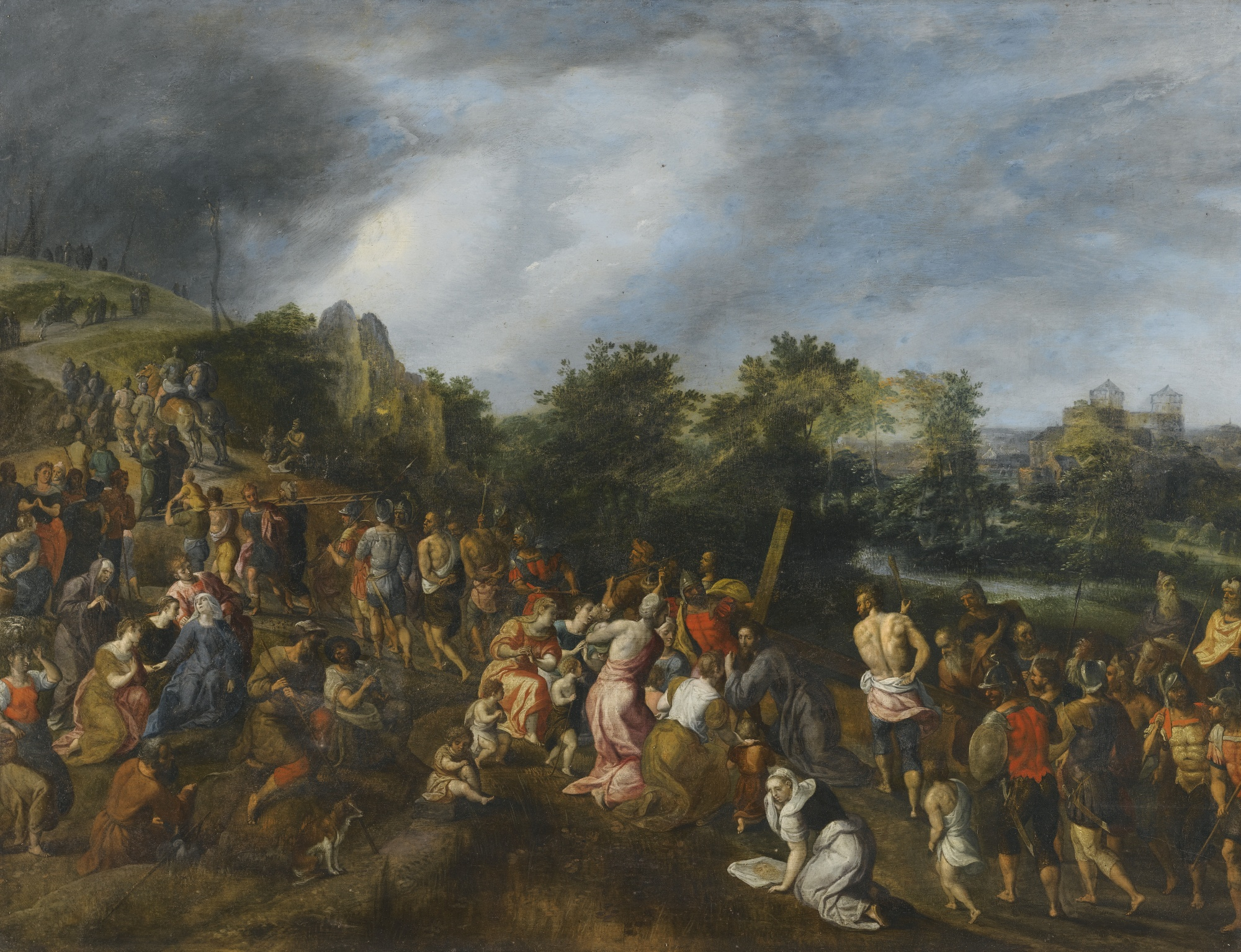
Christ on the road to Calvary

While his brother Frans became a pupil of the landscape painter Herri met de Bles, according to van Mander, Gillis studied landscape painting with Jan Mandijn although there is no record in the Guild books documenting such apprenticeship. Van Mander recounts that both brothers joined the Antwerp Guild of Saint Luke in 1555. However, since Frans received a registered pupil in 1553 it is more likely that Frans had become a master in the Guild earlier. It is suspected that Gillis worked along Marten van Cleve and Maerten de Vos in the studio of Frans Floris, the leading Antwerp history painter of his time.

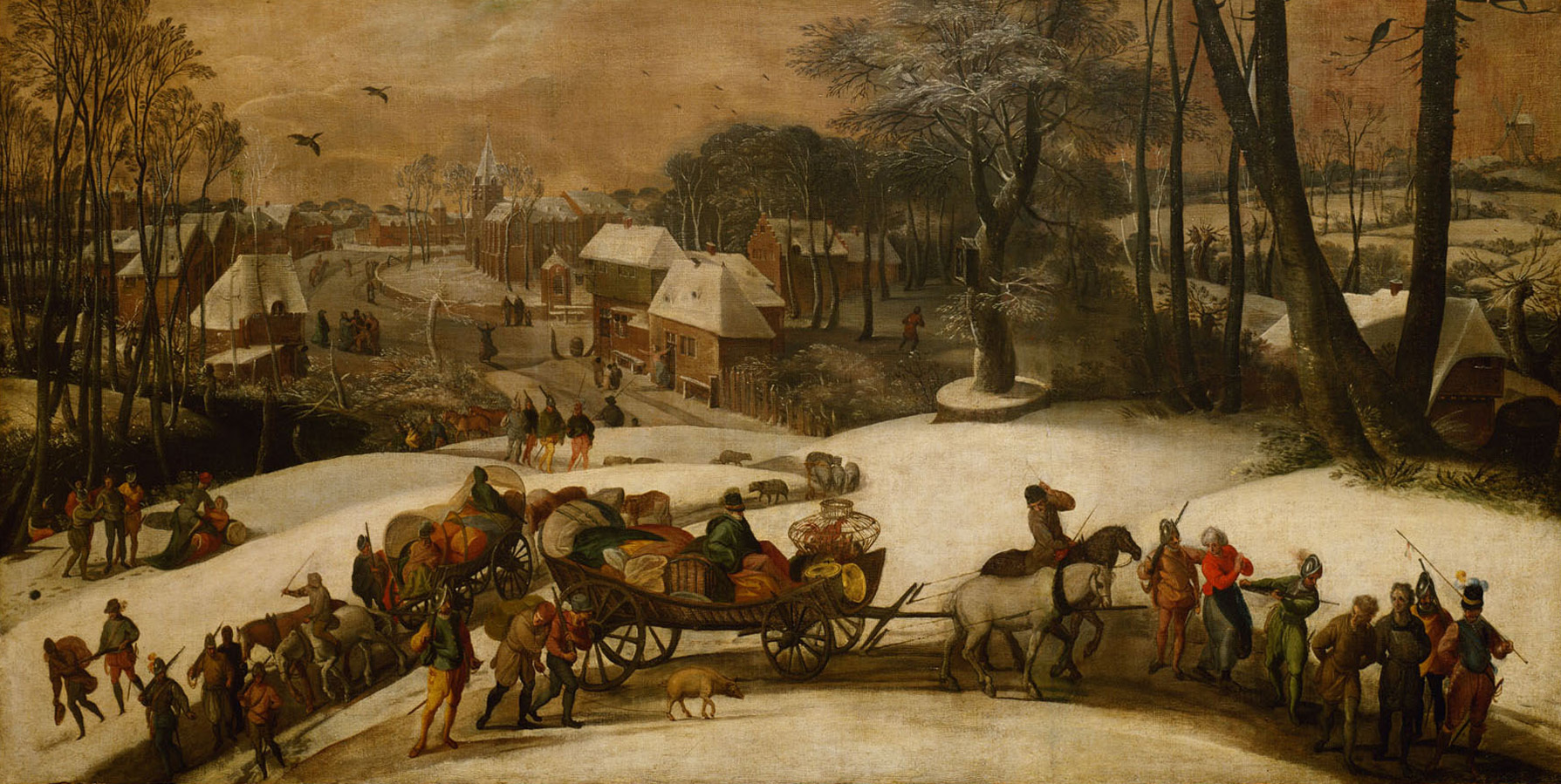
Military expedition in winter

Gillis Mostaert married Margareta Baes in 1563 and the couple had six children. A son also called Gillis and known as Gillis the Younger, born in 1588 also became a painter and joined the Antwerp Guild of Saint Luke as a master's son in 1612. Gillis Mostaert the Elder was well-respected by his fellow painters. The painters Peeter Baltens and Crispin van den Broeck were godfathers to his children born respectively in 1571 and 1588.

Mostaert established a thriving workshop in Antwerp and his work commanded high prices in the market. Inventories of art collections from most important collectors of the late 16th and early 17th centuries list many expensive cabinet paintings of Mostaert, which shows that his work received patronage of prominent and well-off private clients. These collectors included François Perrenot de Granvelle (1559–1607) (younger brother of Cardinal Antoine Perrenot de Granvelle), Archduke Ernest of Austria (1553–1595) and Archduke Leopold Wilhelm of Austria. Filips van Valckenisse who was the Lord of Hemiksem, head of the Antwerp militia and perhaps Antwerp's greatest art collector owned over 50 paintings by Mostaert.

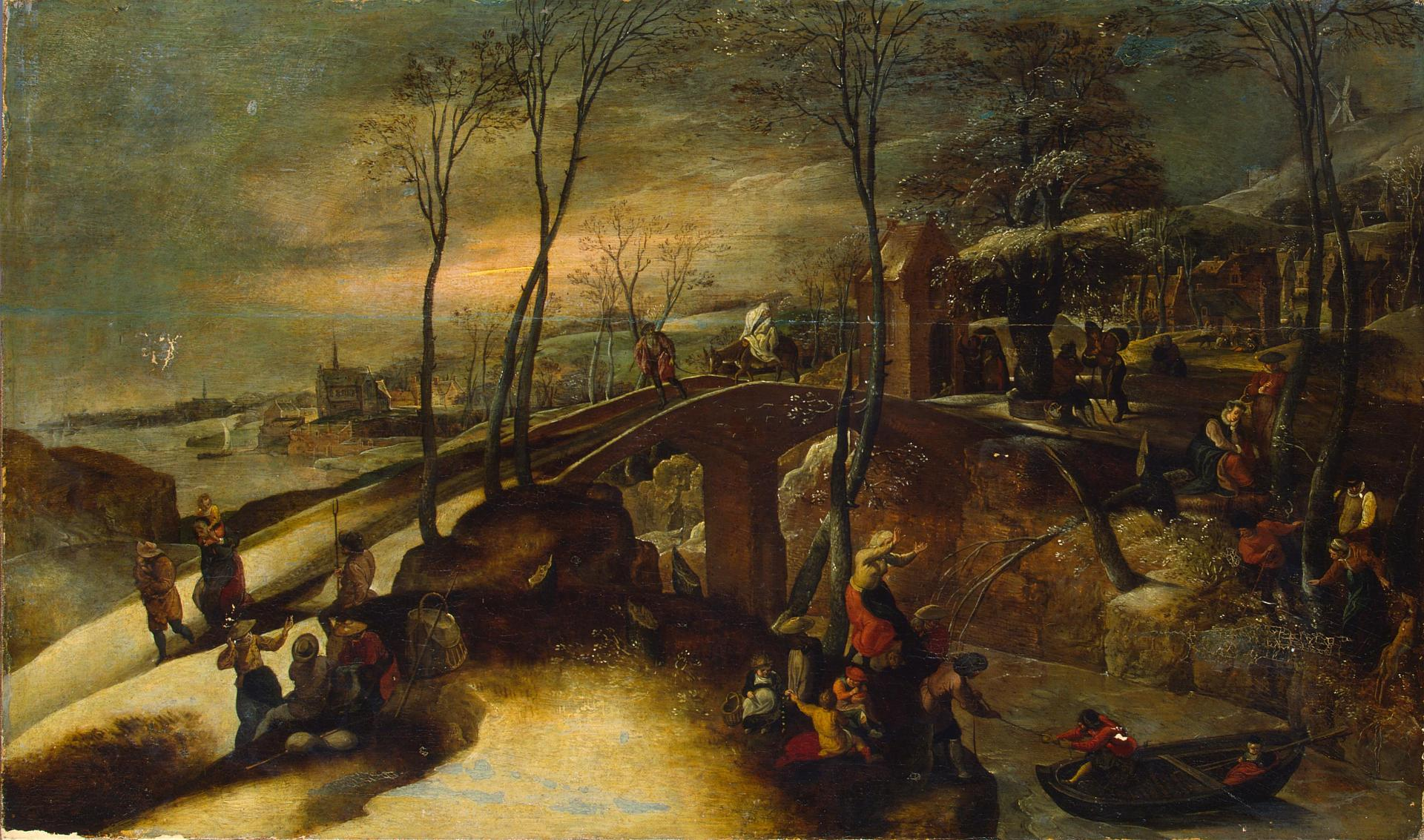
Landscape with the flight into Egypt

He died in Antwerp. It is believed that he was heavily indebted at the time of his death and that the contents of his workshop was sold off or distributed to creditors to pay off these debts. Many of his works were acquired by Filips van Valckenisse, lord of Hemiksem, who still owned a number of these when he died himself in 1614.

His pupils were Gillis van Coninxloo, Hendrik Gijsmans, Henrick Pieters and Jan Soens.

== Work ==
Very few works can be attributed with certainty to Gillis Mostaert as he signed few of his paintings. He added usually the monogram GM and the year on those works that he signed. Mostaert likely operated a large workshop with an important output. He seems to have worked mainly for private clients to whom he supplied pictures in a wide range of subjects. These included scenes of markets, fairs and village, allegories of the four seasons, winter and snow landscapes, scenes of war, hell and burning houses, religious subjects as well as parables and allegories. Mostaert often used copper as a support for his oil paintings, which gives them a certain luster or glowing appearance.

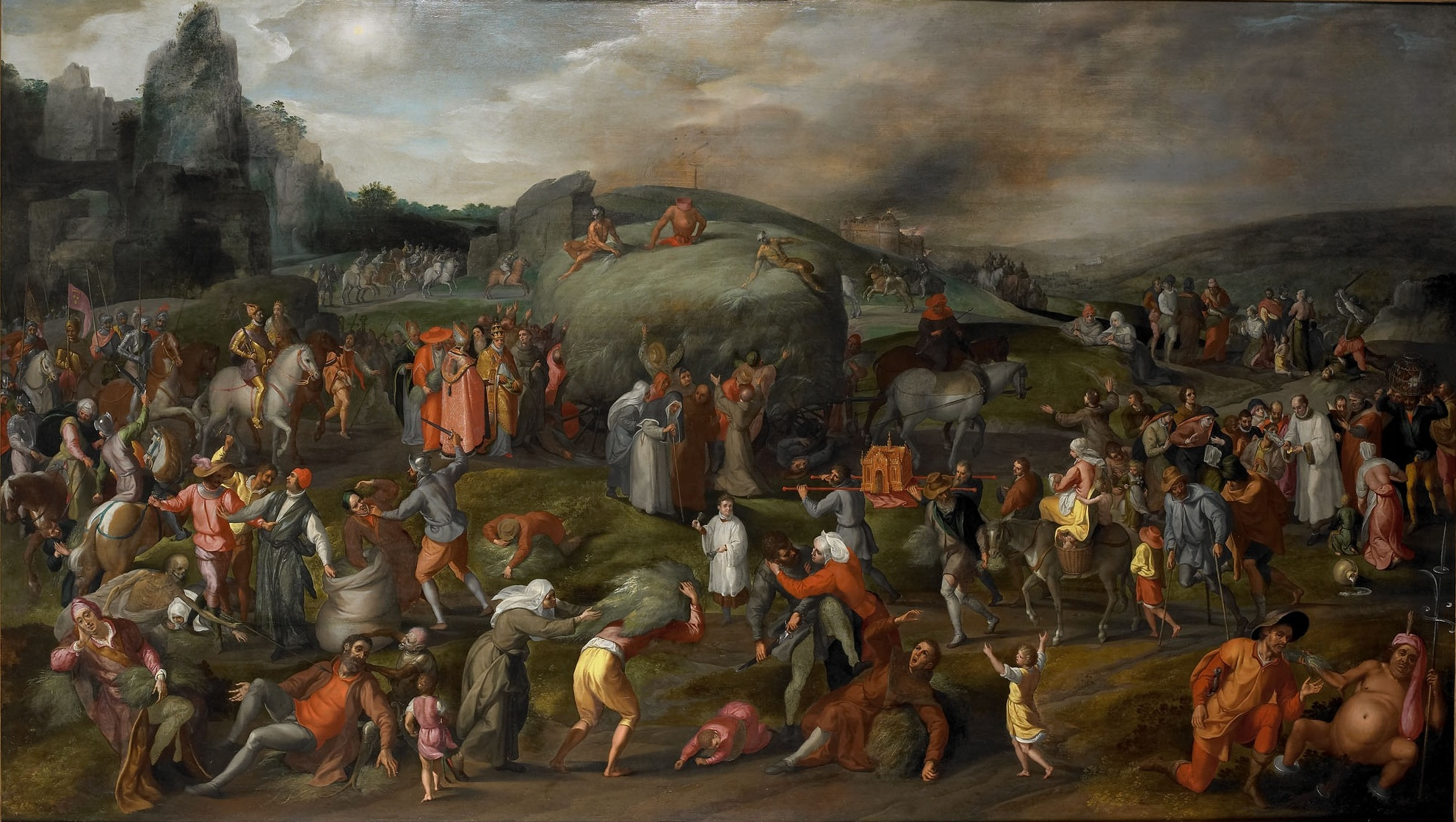
The haywain

Mostaert is believed to have played an important role in the development in Antwerp of genre and landscape art, through his scenes depicting the activities of contemporary people by means of the many small figures in his compositions. He is further credited with the introduction into genre art of the Mannerist style of representing the human figure that was typical for the Antwerp Mannerists of the Frans Floris School. Key characteristics of this emerging style are the natural depiction of nature and reflecting surfaces, the inclusion of various small figures to animate his canvases and the blending of landscape with history.

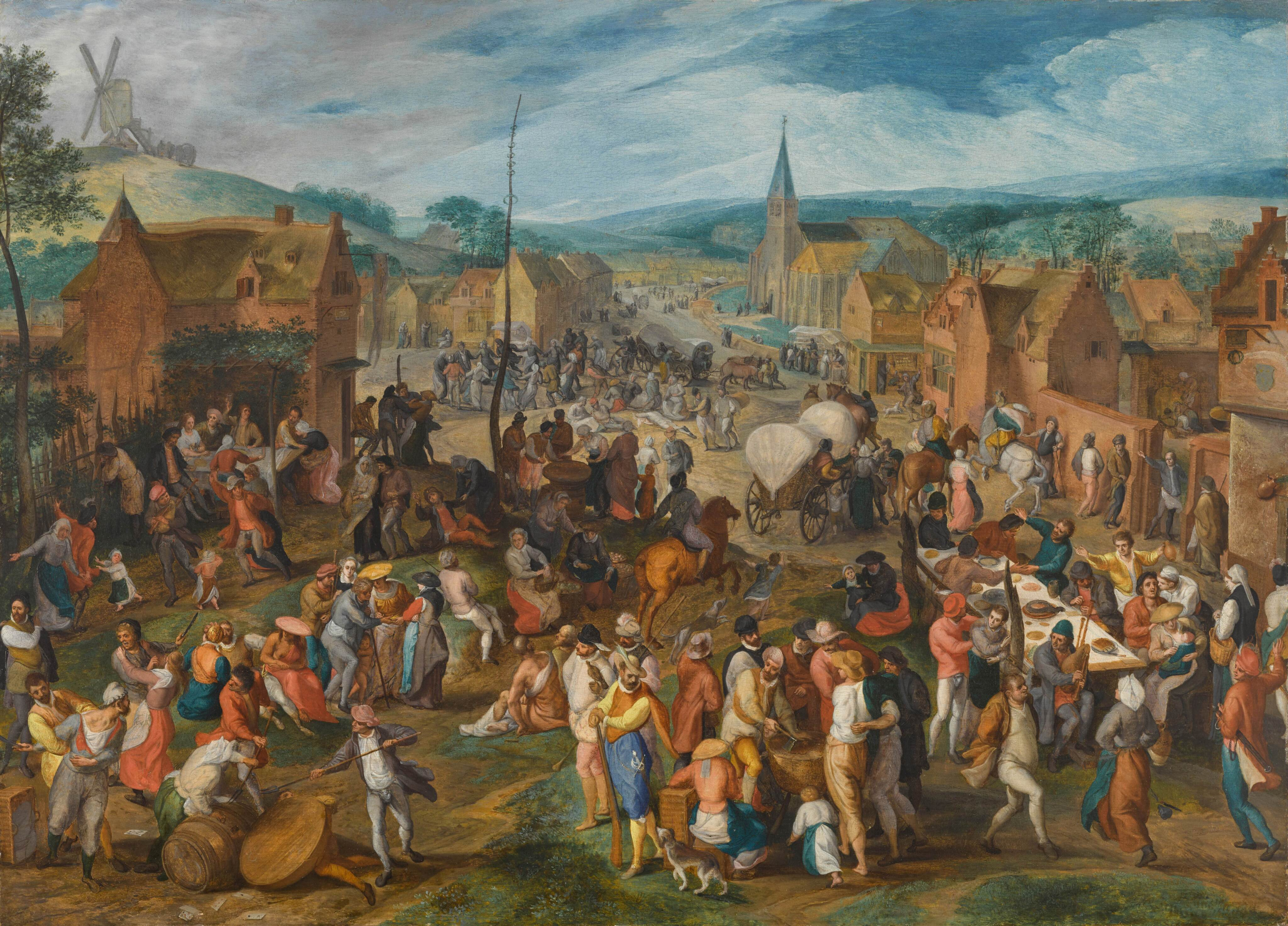
Village fair

He was in his time known for the wit displayed in his works. He reportedly painted a Resurrection of Lazarus, which included a self-portrait of himself amongst the crowd holding his nose so as not to smell Lazarus’ smell of decay. He was thus regarded as continuing a Flemish artistic tradition of which Hieronymus Bosch was the earliest representative and of which his contemporary Pieter Bruegel the Elder was another example. He was active as an imitator of Hieronymus Bosch. For his Bosch-inspired compositions he drew his main inspiration from one of the five tapestries after Bosch that were woven for Cardinal Granvelle in Brussels in 1566. A composition inspired by Bosch is the Haywain (also known as the Allegory on worldly and clerical abuses) of which he produced various versions (e.g. Rijksmuseum on loan to the Museum Catharijneconvent). The picture is an allegorical painting, which satirizes the Roman Catholic Church. The battle for the hay represents the greed that leads to strife, misery, death and destruction. The 16th-century meaning of the expression "It's all hay" was: it's all worthless, a deception. In the picture Mostaert has placed monks and church dignitaries closest to the haywain in criticism of the Catholic clergy. Throughout the composition the seven deadly sins are represented: gluttony, sloth, envy, avarice, pride, wrath and lust. For instance, a man on the far left has fallen asleep on a bag of hay and represents sloth.

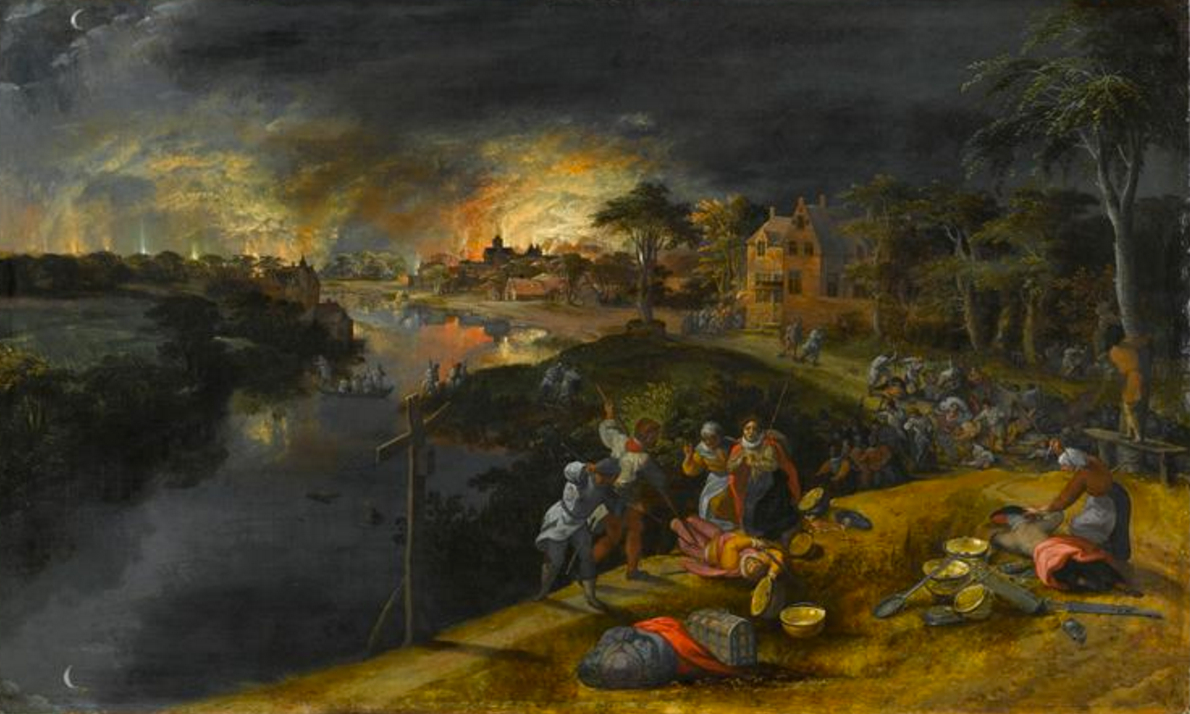
Landscape with marauding soldiers

Mostaert's 'fire paintings' were listed in the inventories of important collectors of the late 16th and early 17th centuries. Scenes depicting the destruction of Sodom and Gomorrah and the burning of villages at night gave the artist the opportunity to show off his skill in rendering the effects of light and fire. One of his masterpieces in this genre is the Landscape with marauding soldiers (1569, Louvre). This composition offers a nightly view over a landscape with a river an at least 8 sources of fire extending over the whole horizon. The fires were likely set by soldiers, some of whom are shown under attack by villagers in retribution. The villagers appear to have gained the upper hand on the soldiers some of whom together with their female companions are shown on the foreground lying on the ground under threat of being killed. The loot including some gleaming pots and pans and some bundles is likely to be recovered by the villagers.

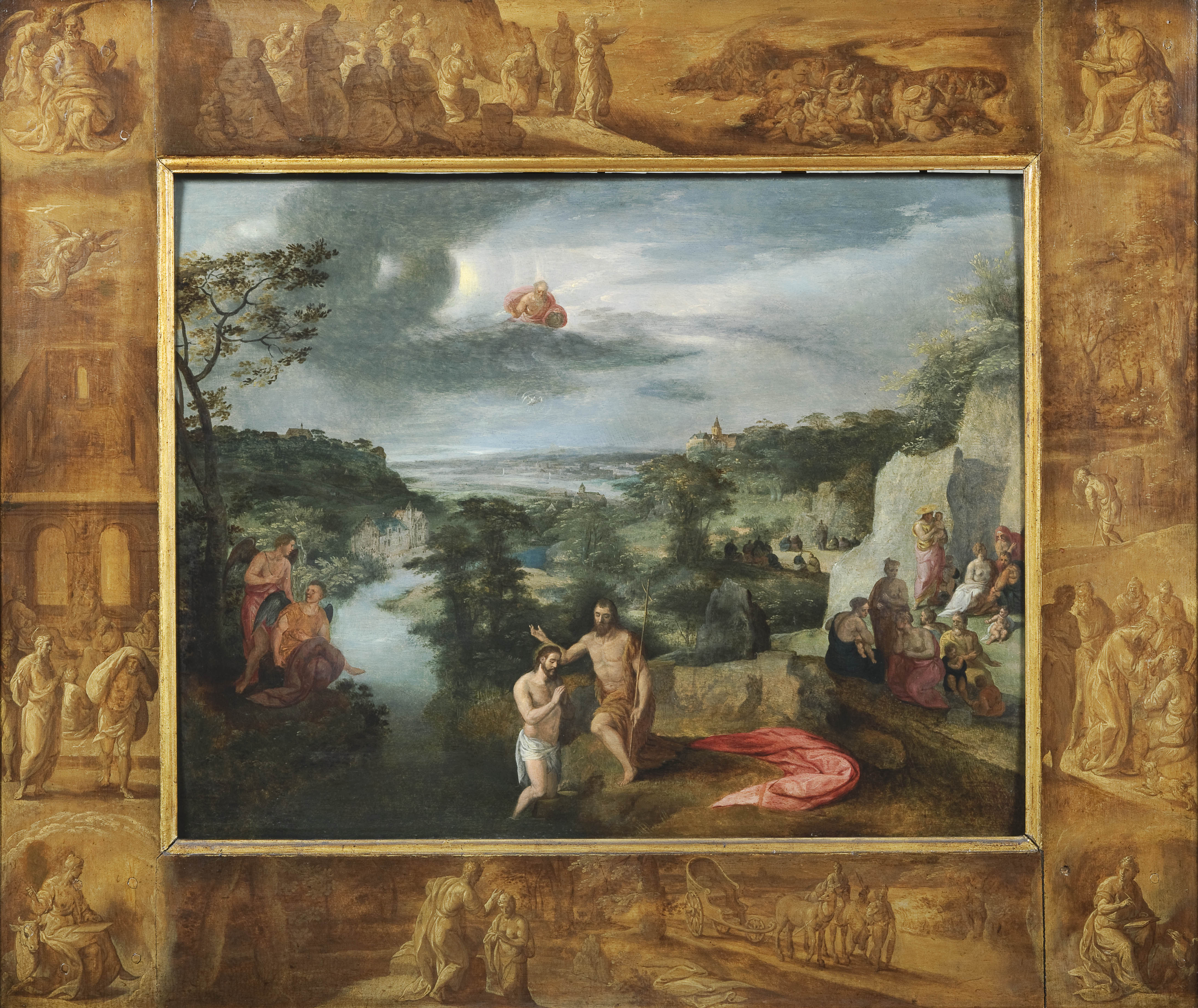
The baptism of Christ

Mostaert is credited with the invention of paintings of biblical scenes, which are framed on all sides by smaller scenes in grisaille painted on wood. An example is The Baptism of Christ (Fondation Custodia). Mostaert started creating these composite paintings from the 1570s onwards. Several of his paintings in this style were formerly incorrectly ascribed to Frans Francken the Younger who painted similar scenes into the 1620s.

He was sought after as a staffage painter and added the figures in landscapes of his Antwerp colleagues such as Cornelis van Dalem (to whom he introduced Bartholomäus Spranger as a pupil), Marten van Cleve, Cornelis Molenaer and Jacob Grimmer and in the architectural paintings and city views of Hendrik van Steenwijck I and Hans Vredeman de Vries.
