= Pieter Schoubroeck =

German artist

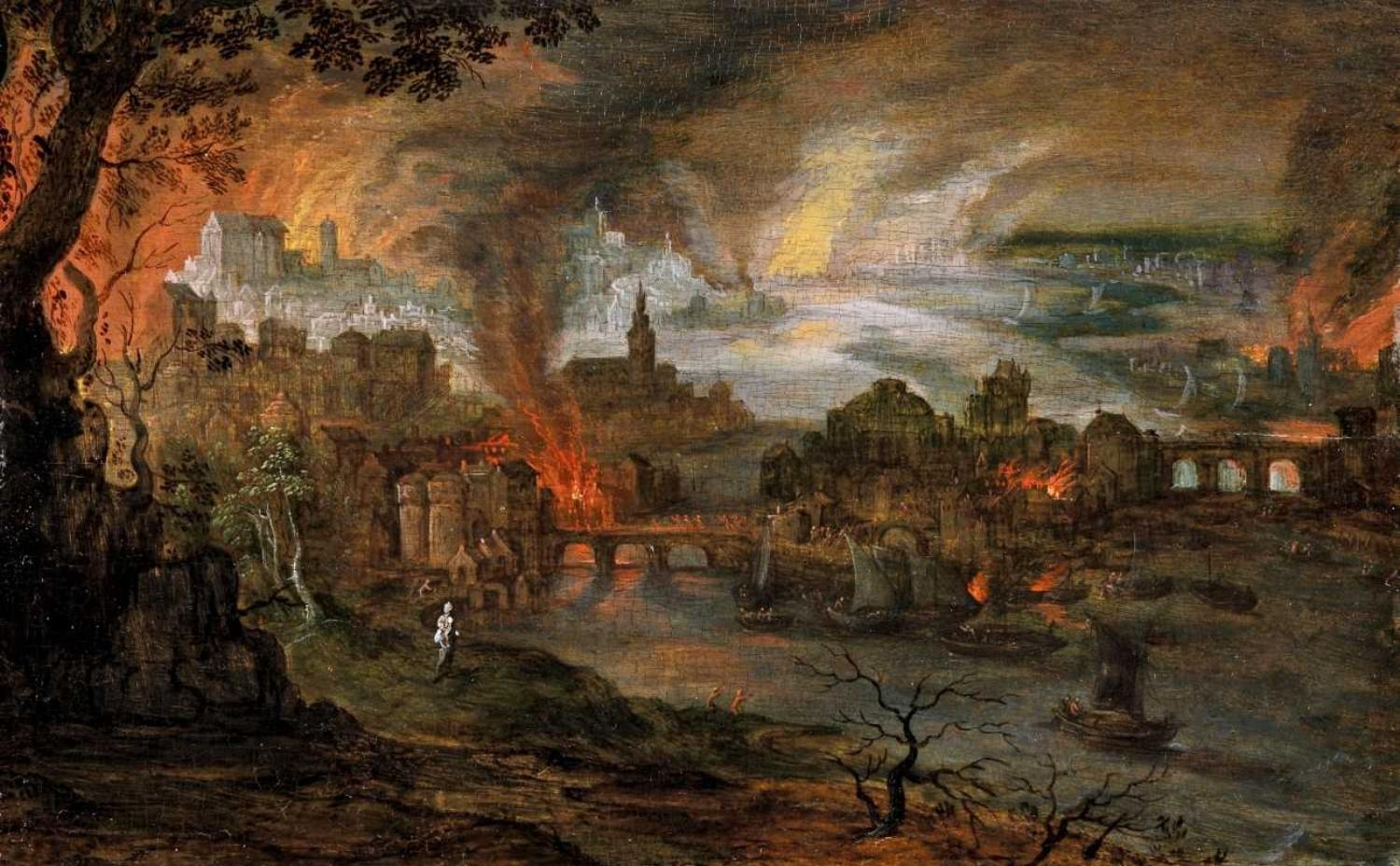
The Destruction of Sodom and Gomorrah, c. 1600

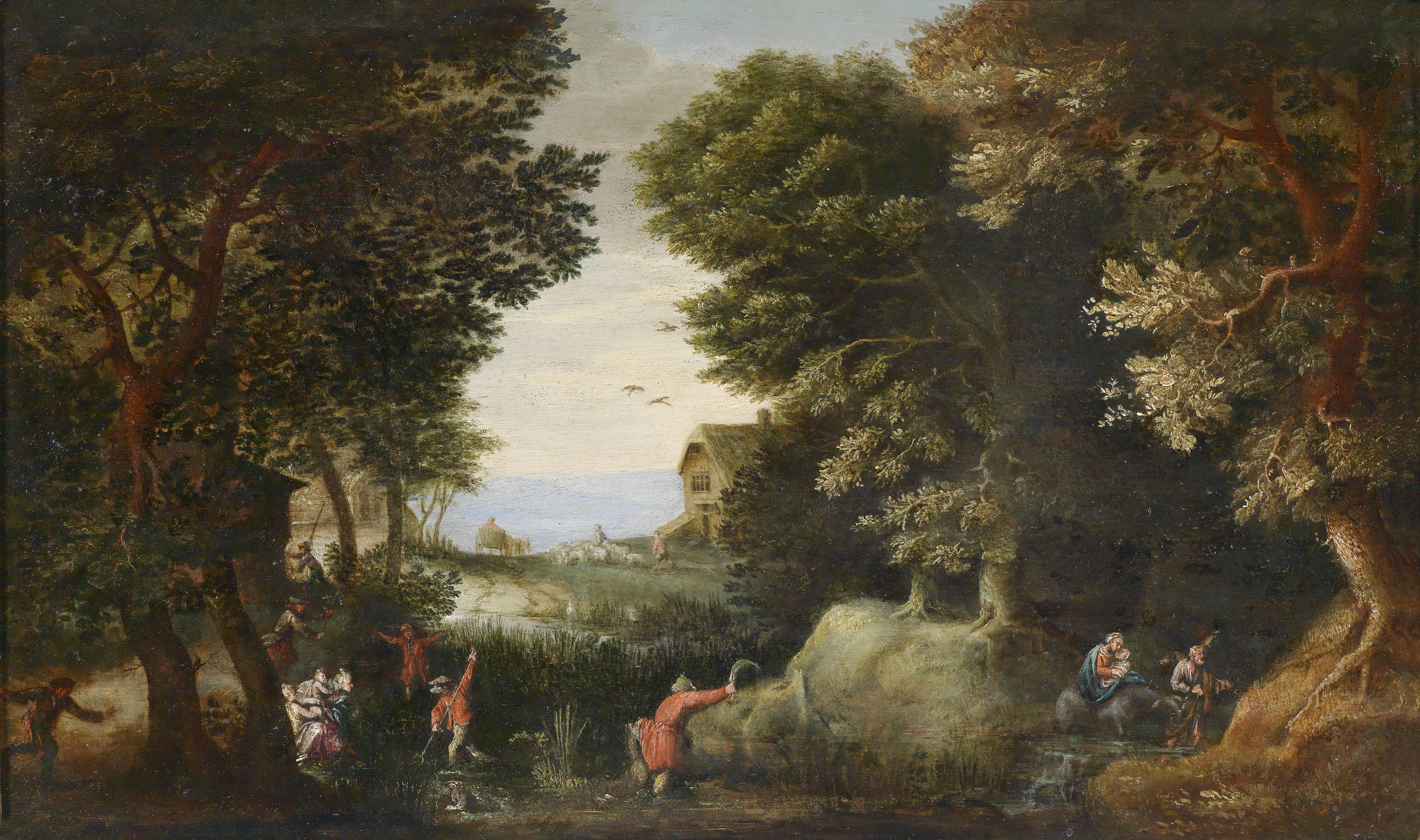
Leto transforms the Lycian Peasants into Frogs by Pieter Schoubroeck, 1607

Pieter Schoubroeck, or Schaubroeck (ca.1570 – May 10, 1607), was a German landscape painter of the Frankenthal school.

== Biography ==
Schoubroeck was born at Hessheim. His father was of Flemish origin and his mother Clarken de Wale was also from the Southern Netherlands. According to the RKD he was active in Italy in 1595, Neurenberg in 1597-1600, and moved to Frankenthal in 1601. He painted landscapes and is considered a member of the school of Frankenthal. The school of Frankenthal included the painters Gillis van Coninxloo, Anton Mirou, and Hendrik van der Borcht the elder & son. He died in Frankenthal.
