= Hendrik van der Borcht II =

German Baroque painter

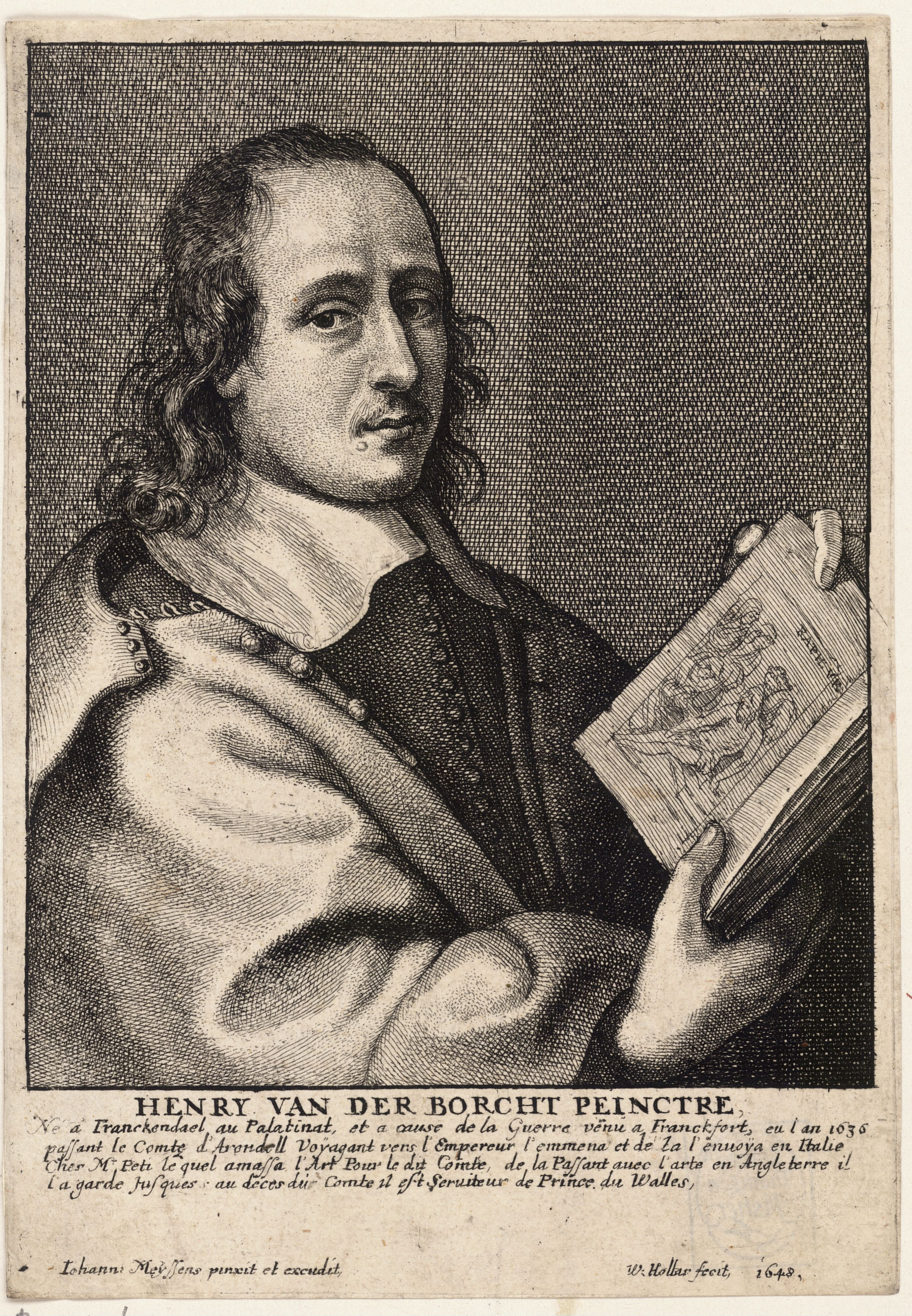
Etching by Wenceslaus Hollar in Het Gulden Cabinet, p 383

Hendrik van der Borcht II (8 March 1614, in Frankenthal – 29 June 1676) was a German Baroque painter.

== Biography ==
He learned to paint from his father, Hendrik van der Borcht the elder. Thomas Howard, 21st Earl of Arundel, passing through Frankfurt, became his patron in 1636 when he was only 22, taking him along on a Grand Tour of Italy. In 1637 he was appointed curator of the Earl's collection in London. This was the same period that the Earl was collecting art steadily, and by that time the collection already had works painted on location by Gerard van Honthorst and Joachim von Sandrart. It is unknown how long he held this position before returning to Germany, where he later died.

According to Houbraken, who confused him with his father, he was also an expert in old rareties and medals. He is possibly the brother of the painter Sebastian van der Borcht, active in Frankenthal.
