= Gillis van Coninxloo =

Flemish painter

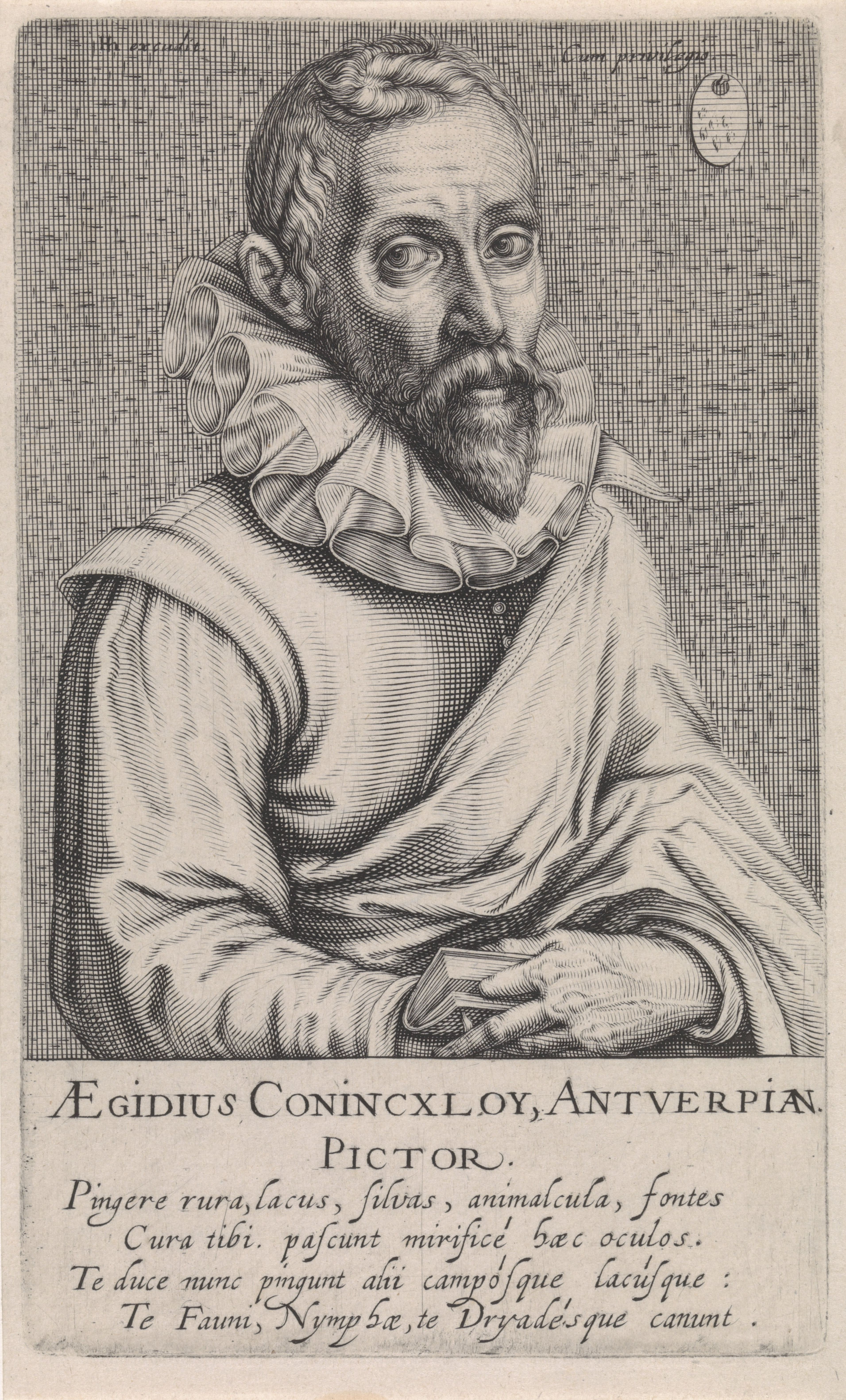
Portrait of Gillis van Coninxloo by Andries Jacobsz Stock, published by Hendrik Hondius I in 1610.

Gillis van Coninxloo (now also referred to as Gillis van Coninxloo II and previously referred to as Gillis van Coninxloo III) (24 January 1544 – January 1607) was a Flemish painter of landscapes. Commencing his career in Antwerp, he worked the last 20 years of his life abroad, first in Germany and later in the Dutch Republic. He played an important role in the development of Northern landscape art at the turn of the 17th century, in particular in his elaboration of the forest landscape.

== Life ==
He was born on 24 January 1544 in Antwerp as the son of Gillis and Adriana van Doornicke. His father, originally from Brussels, was a painter who had moved to Antwerp where he became a master in the Guild of Saint Luke in 1539 and married Adriana van Doornicke. Adriana van Doornicke was the daughter of the painter Jan van Dornicke and the widow of the painter Jan van Amstel. Her sister was married to the prominent artist Pieter Coecke van Aelst. Gillis' father died when he was only about 10 months old. His mother made a living by selling paintings in Antwerpen and cities in Brabant and Flanders. She remarried on 20 December 1545 to the painter Peeter van Else alias van den Winckele.

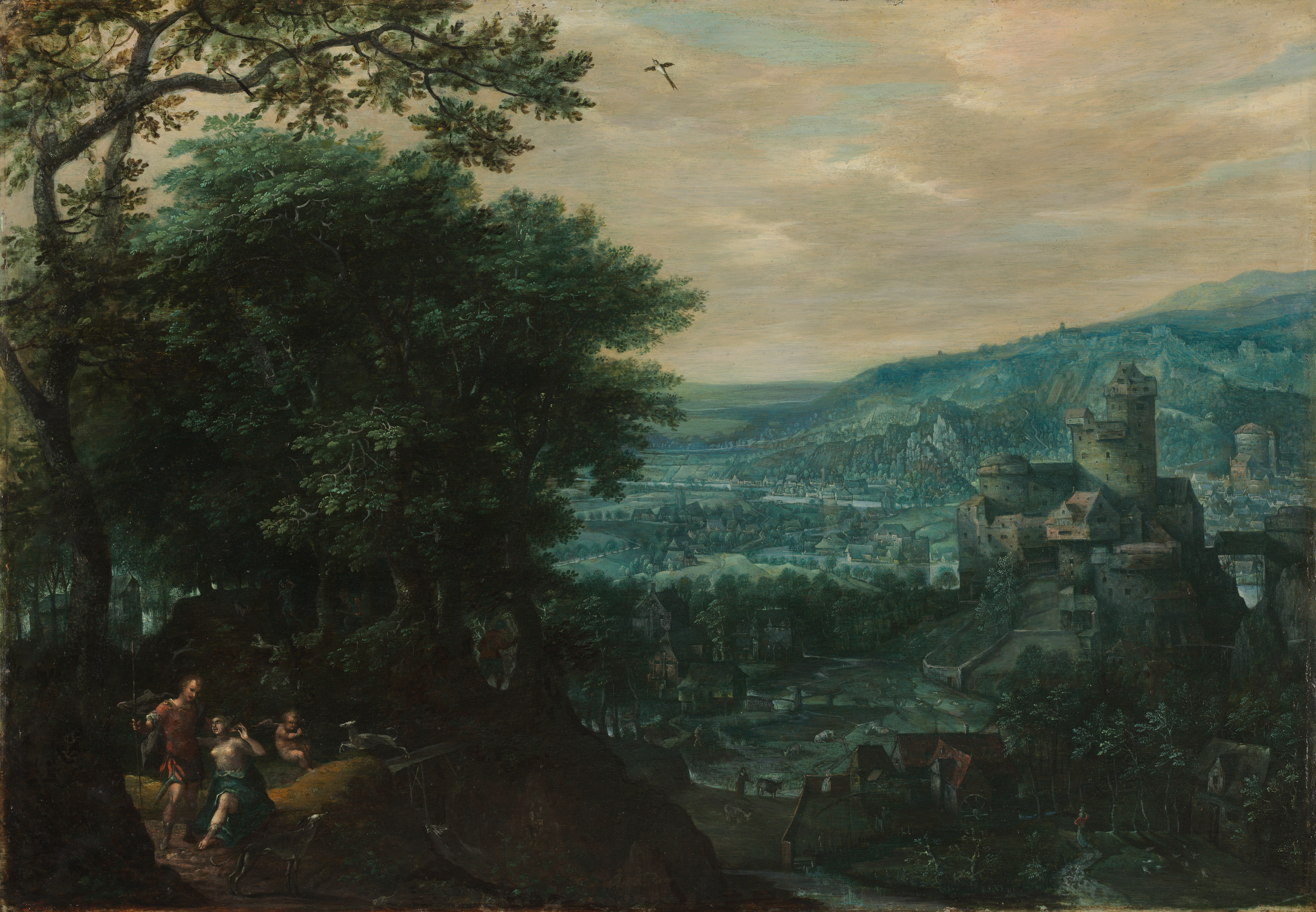
Landscape with Venus and Adonis

He studied initially under Pieter Coecke van Aelst the Younger, the son of his uncle Pieter Coecke van Aelst. After his master died in 1559 he continued his studies with Lenaert Kroes. After the death of his mother in 1562 he went to live with the painter Gillis Mostaert, in whose workshop he worked in return for food and lodging. He was also allowed to work for his own account. He subsequently traveled in France visiting, amongst other cities, Paris and Orléans. He had planned to travel from France onto Italy. However, upon learning that Pauwels Coecke van Aelst, his cousin and the bastard son of Pieter Coecke van Aelst, had died, he decided to return to Antwerp to marry his cousin's widow Maria Robroeck. They married in 1570 and would have at least two children: Catalijne (born c. 1579) and Gillis III (c. 1581-1619/20). Gillis III also became a painter and is known for still lifes. In 1570 he became a member of the Antwerp Guild of Saint Luke.

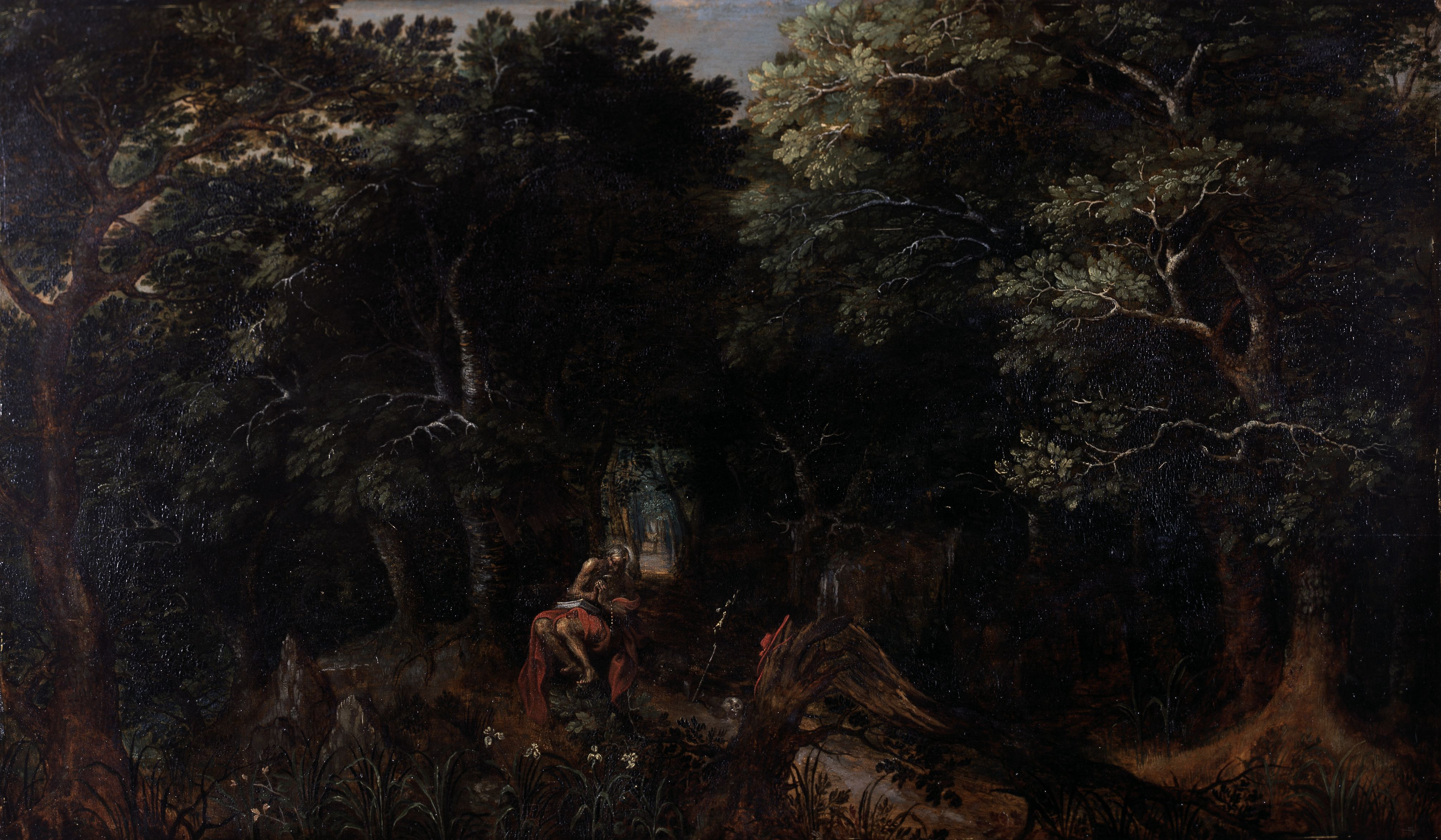
Woodland with Saint Jerome, Museum of Fine Arts, Ghent

Van Coninxloo had a very busy workshop which produced large landscape paintings which were sold internationally including to the king of Spain. After the outbreak of the Eighty Years' War in c. 1567, the Habsburg Netherlands went through a long period of turmoil and religious strife between Catholics and Protestants. Antwerp had chosen the side of the Protestant rebels who opposed their suppression by the Spanish rulers. Van Coninxloo took the side of the rebels and was active in the defence of Antwerp during the Siege of Antwerp (1584-1585). He received in January 1585 a large monetary reward from the outer mayor of Antwerp Philips of Marnix for his role in the defence. He left soon after receiving his reward as Antwerp fell the same year to the Spanish. He first resided in Middelburg, Zeeland and then in 1587 he moved to Frankenthal where he was active until 1595. He subsequently moved to Amsterdam. After the death of his first wife in 1603, he remarried in Amsterdam on 23 August 1603 to Geertgen van Eden (born 1675).

He had many pupils including Pieter Brueghel the Younger, Govert Govertsz van Arnhem, Willem van den Bundel, Gillis van Coninxloo III, Jonas van Merle, Hercules Seghers and Jacques van der Wijen.

He died in Amsterdam where he was buried in the Nieuwe Kerk on 4 January 1607.

== Work ==
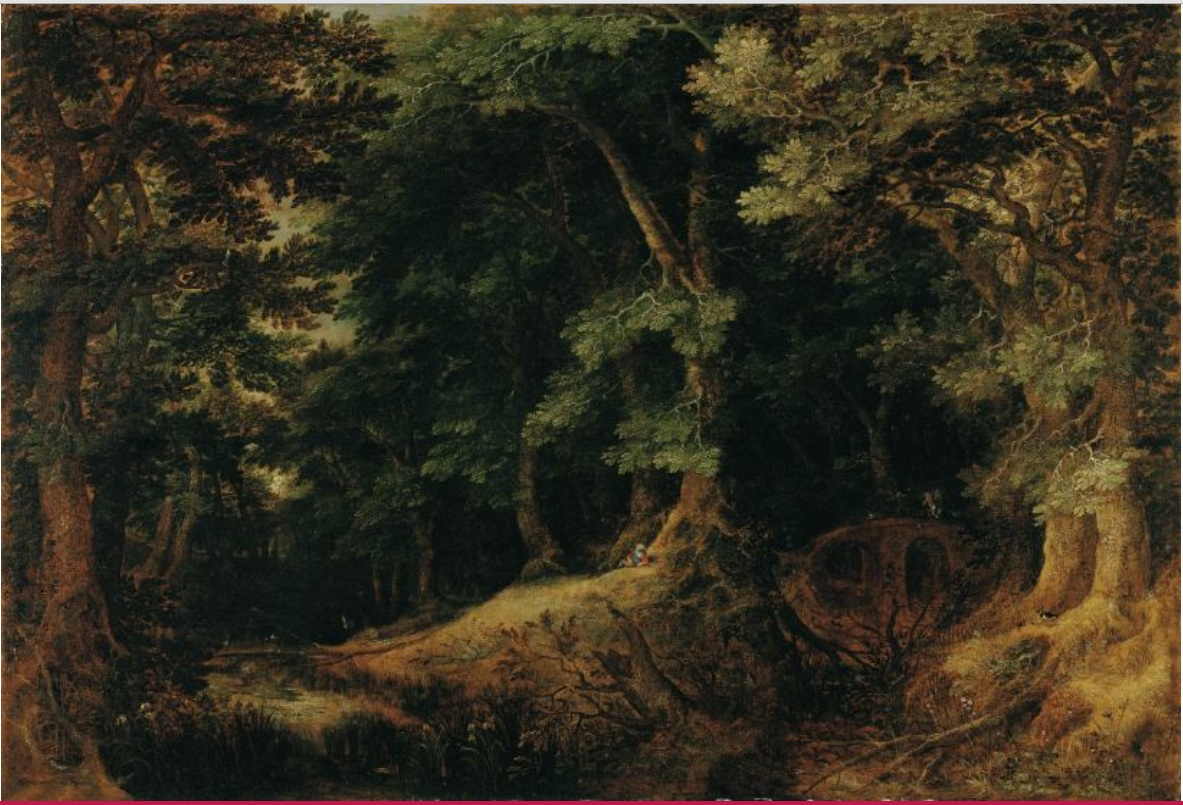
Forest Landscape, 1598, Liechtenstein Collection

Coninxloo ranks as one of the most important Flemish landscape painters of around the turn of the 17th century. He exercised a strong influence on Jan Brueghel the Elder, Pieter Schoubroeck, Roelandt Savery, and other Flemish and Dutch landscape painters of this period.

His early landscapes were often Northern Mannerist versions of the established world landscape type, though with close views of trees already narrowing the panoramic view. Beginning in the 1590s Coninxloo introduced a new approach into Flemish landscape painting, with close-up views of forests reminiscent of Albrecht Altdorfer and the Danube school nearly a century earlier and almost or entirely shutting out a distant view. While earlier forest landscapes had used forests as the backdrop for human activity, van Coninxloo turned them into the subject proper by submerging tiny human figures in elaborate compositions of trees on a hugely exaggerated scale. A Forest Landscape of 1598 in the Liechtenstein Collection is the first work to take this approach to its extreme: the sky is only visible in a few patches between branches and a single tiny human figure reclines under a tree. This painting achieves great intensity and atmospheric quality through its fine shades of brown and green and its accentuated handling of light.

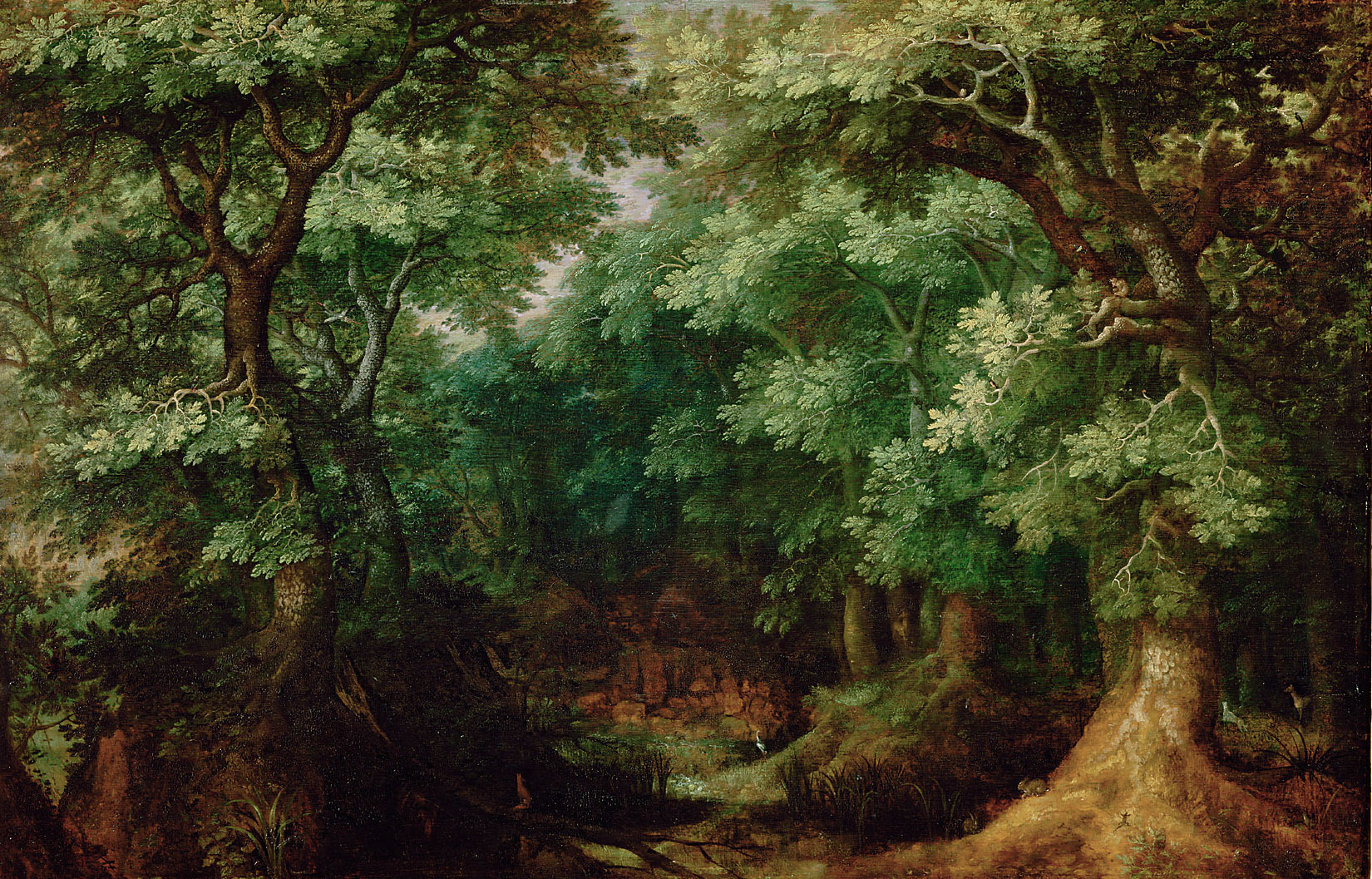
Forest landscape, c. 1600, Kunsthistorisches Museum

During his stay in Frankenthal from 1588 to 1595, he influenced several better known Flemish émigré landscape painters, who are now collectively referred to as the 'Frankenthal School'. The early 17th century art historian Karel van Mander wrote about Coninxloo in his Schilder-boeck. Van Mander stated that Coninxloo's teacher Pieter Coeke van Aelst was his cousin, and that I know at this time of no better landscape painter, and I notice that they are following his manner very much in Holland.

The influence of his work spread in Holland by means of his designs for large-scale prints, mainly engraved by Flemish émigré printmakers Nicolaes de Bruyn and Jan van Londerseel who published in the Dutch Republic.

== Selected works ==
His paintings include:

- The Judgment of Midas, Gemäldegalerie Alte Meister, Dresden
- Landscape with a Scene from the Myth of Latona and the Lycian Peasants, Hermitage Museum, Saint Petersburg
- Landscape with Venus and Adonis, Cleveland Museum of Art
- Landscape with Duck Hunters (Saarland Museum, Saarbrücken
- Forest landscape, c. 1600, Kunsthistorisches Museum, Vienna
