= Frans Badens =

Flemish-born painter

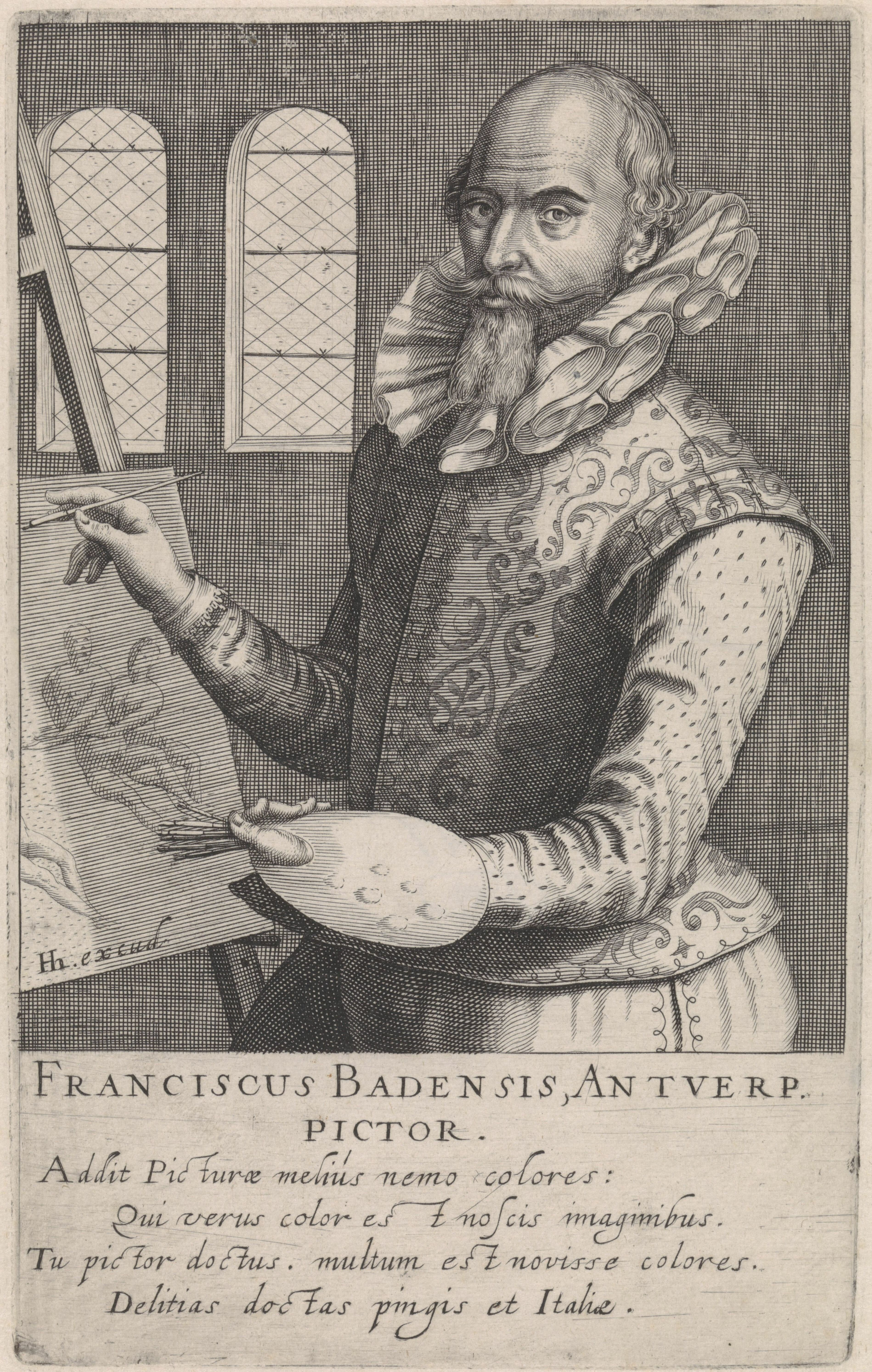
Portrait of Frans Badens

Frans Badens (Antwerp, 1571 – Amsterdam, before 17 November 1618) was a Flemish-born painter who was active in Amsterdam where he was known for his mythological and biblical scenes, genre scenes, portraits and still lifes. In his lifetime he was regarded as one of the most important painters who had moved to Amsterdam and was admired for his realistic treatment of the skin.

== Life ==
Frans Badens was born in Antwerp in 1571 as the son of an obscure artist. His brother was Jan Badens. The family left Antwerp and moved to Amsterdam shortly after 18 November 1576. It is not clear with whom he trained. The early 17th century art historian and biographer Karel van Mander reported that Badens trained with his father who died in 1604. It is believed that he studied in Italy between 1591 and 1597 where he had travelled with Jacob Matham.

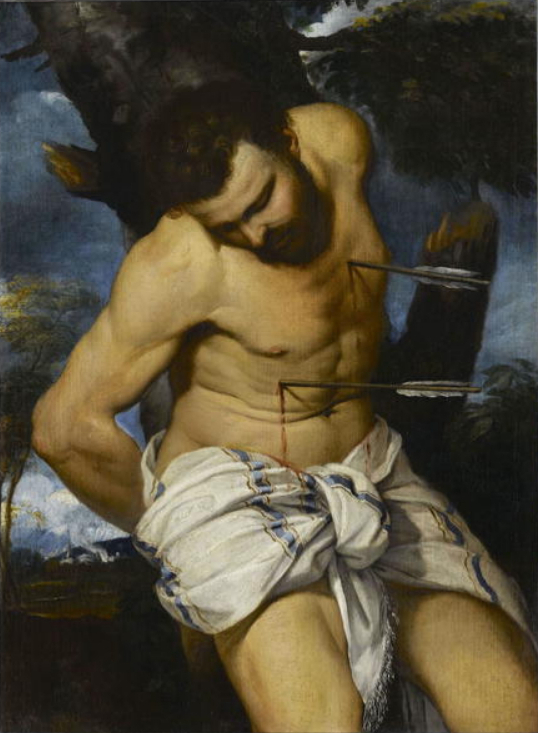
Saint Sebastian

Badens is recorded back in Amsterdam in 1598 when he bought a house in the Kalverstraat. Badens took over the studio previously owned by first Dirck Barendsz and later on by Pieter Isaacsz. It has been suggested that this studio located on the Oude Turfmarkt in Amsterdam was known as a place where local citizens could buy paintings in the Italian manner. By acquiring this studio Badens likely could rely on the status of that area of Amsterdam where paintings in a certain style and of a certain quality were sold.

His pupils included Gerbrand Bredero, Adriaen van Nieulandt and Jeremias van Winghe. When the prominent engraver Hendrick Hondius decided to try his hand at painting in 1600, Frans Badens was likely his first master.

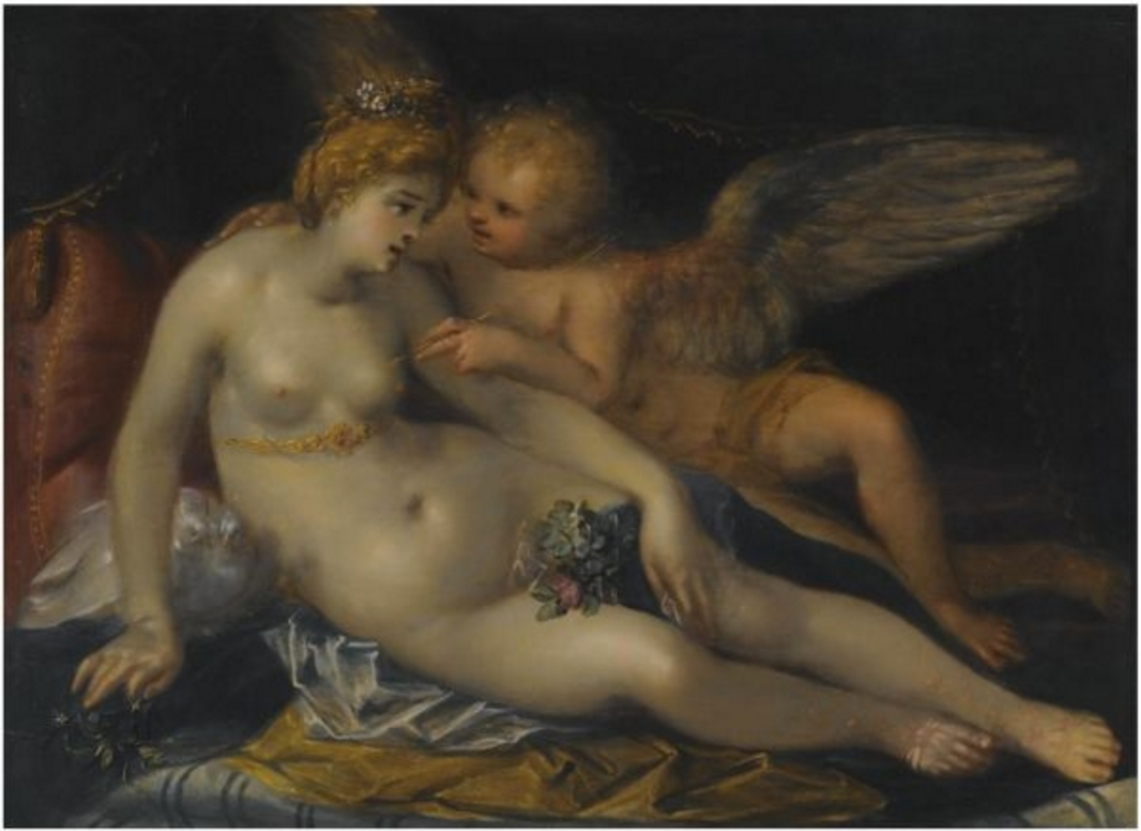
Venus and Cupid

The contemporary reputation of Badens is evidenced by the inclusion of an engraved portrait of the artist in Hendrick Hondius' Pictorum aliquot celebrium praecipue Germaniae inferioris Effigies (Effigies of some celebrated painters, chiefly of Lower Germany), which was a collection of 69 portraits of prominent, chiefly Netherlandish artists published in 1610. The accompanying Latin verse underneath the portrait begins with the line "addit picturae meliús nemo colores", which translates as "no one was better at adding colours to a painting."

The artist is believed to have died in Amsterdam before 17 November 1618.

== Work ==
Karel van Mander lauded Badens as an accomplished painter of history and portraits, and reported that he excelled in painting conversation pieces. He was also known for his tronies (portraits), paintings of horses and large history paintings. Van Mander reported that Badens painted in the Italian style. His body of work is not firmly established and some works attributed to Pieter Isaacsz have been tentatively reattributed to Badens. This includes a Venus and Cupid auctioned at Sotheby's on 29 October 2009, London, lot 14.

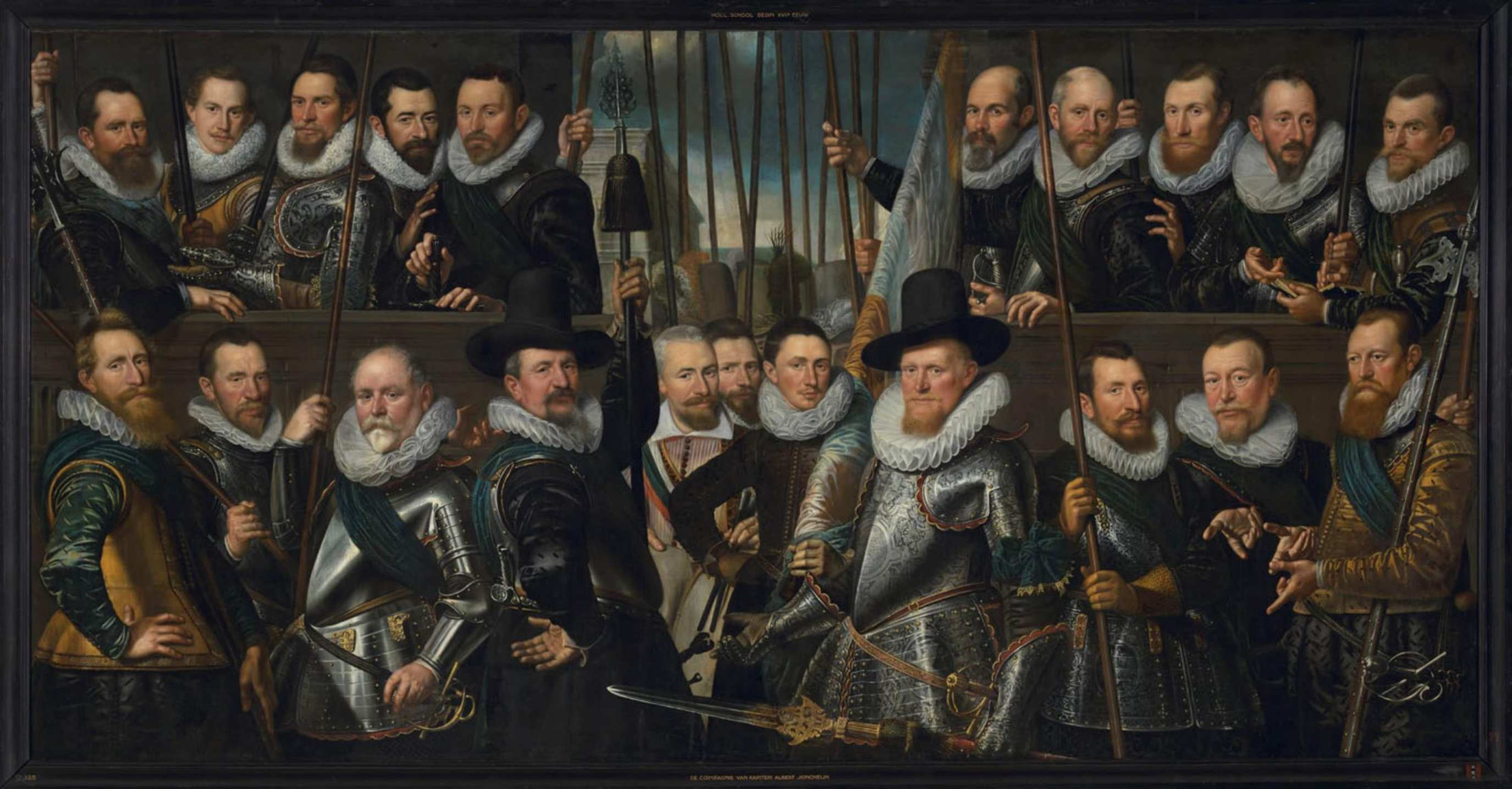
Civic Guardsmen from a company of the Crossbow Civic Guard

To Badens has been attributed a Civic Guardsmen from a company of the Crossbow Civic Guard (1603 - 1618, Amsterdam Museum). The painting falls in the genre of the schutterstukken and represents one of the schutterijen (civic guards) of Amsterdam. In this composition Badens created a sense of space by providing a through view. A striking figure is the drummer in the centre. Occupying a low rank, he would likely not have had enough money to pay for his portrait. Probably the drummer and the many lances and hats in the background were included to create the impression that the whole guard was present in the painting.

Frans Badens is known to have collaborated on a Ganymedes (now lost) with the landscape painter Govert Janszn called Mijnheer who enjoyed a considerable reputation at the time.
