= Huijgh Pietersz. Voskuijl =

Dutch painter

Huijgh Pietersz Voskuijl
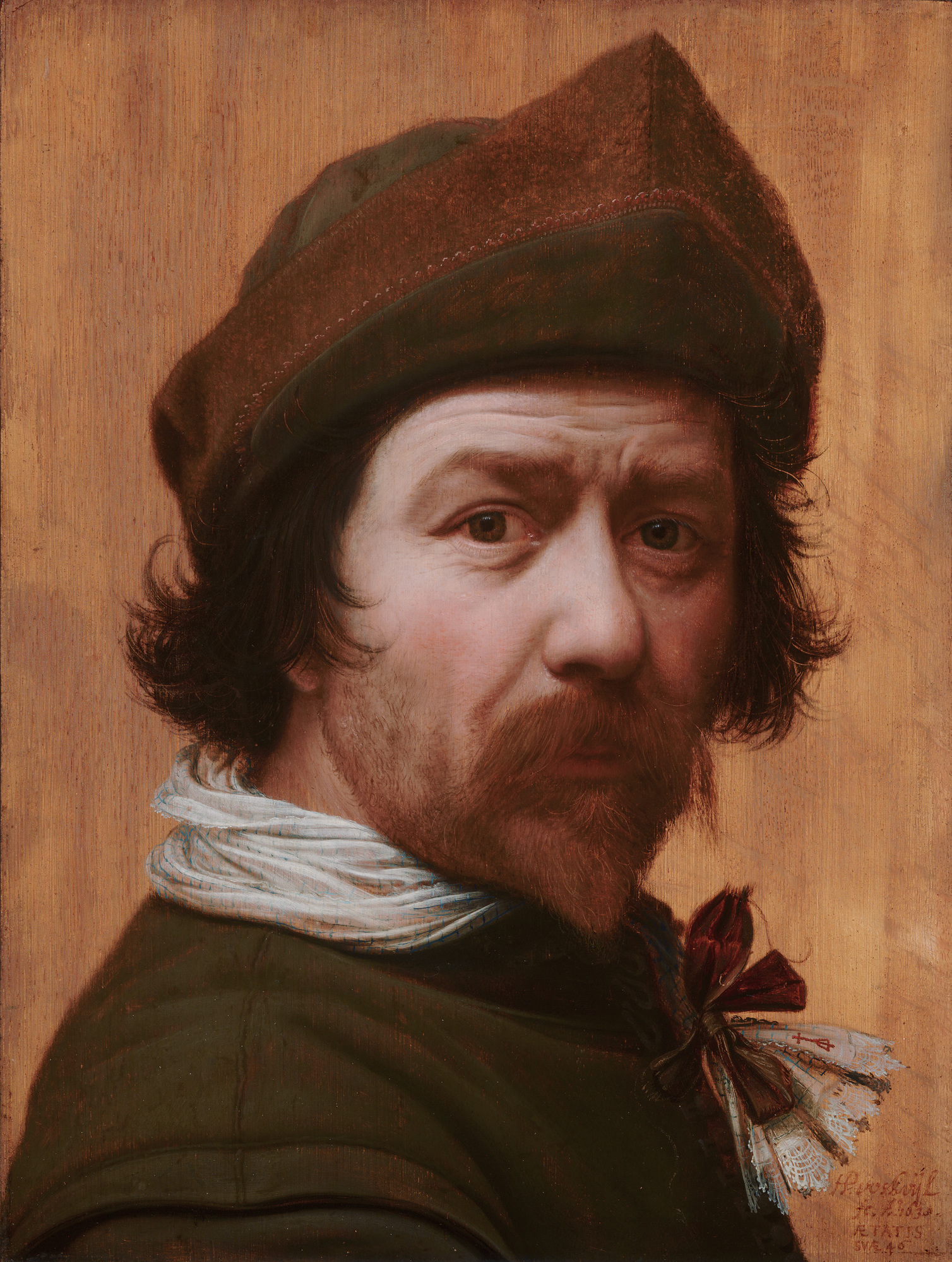
- Self-portrait, 1638
- Born: 1591; Amsterdam
- Died: 1665; Amsterdam

Huijgh Pietersz Voskuijl or Huygh Pietersz. Voskuyl (1591 – 1665) was a Dutch painter.

Voskuijl was born in Amsterdam and became a pupil of Pieter Isaacsz. His works have previously been attributed to Bartholomeus van der Helst, a younger painter who he may have influenced. Little is known of his life, other than archival records stating he married Grietje Fransdr from Gorinchem at the age of 47 in 1640, and eight children were baptized 1642–1660. He painted pendant portraits in 1640 of the Amsterdam brewer Philips Denijs and his wife Geertruyd Reael:

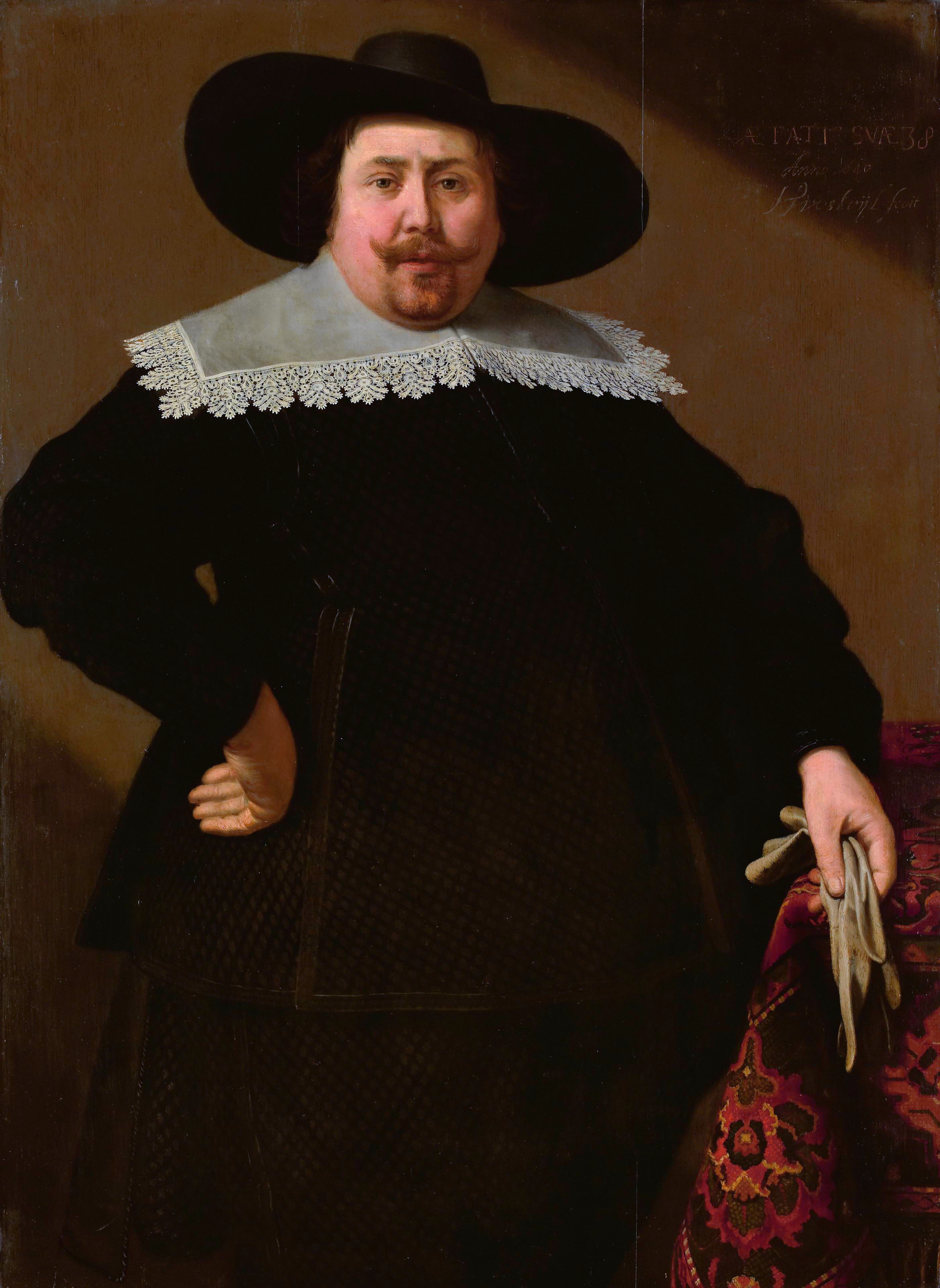
Philips Denijs

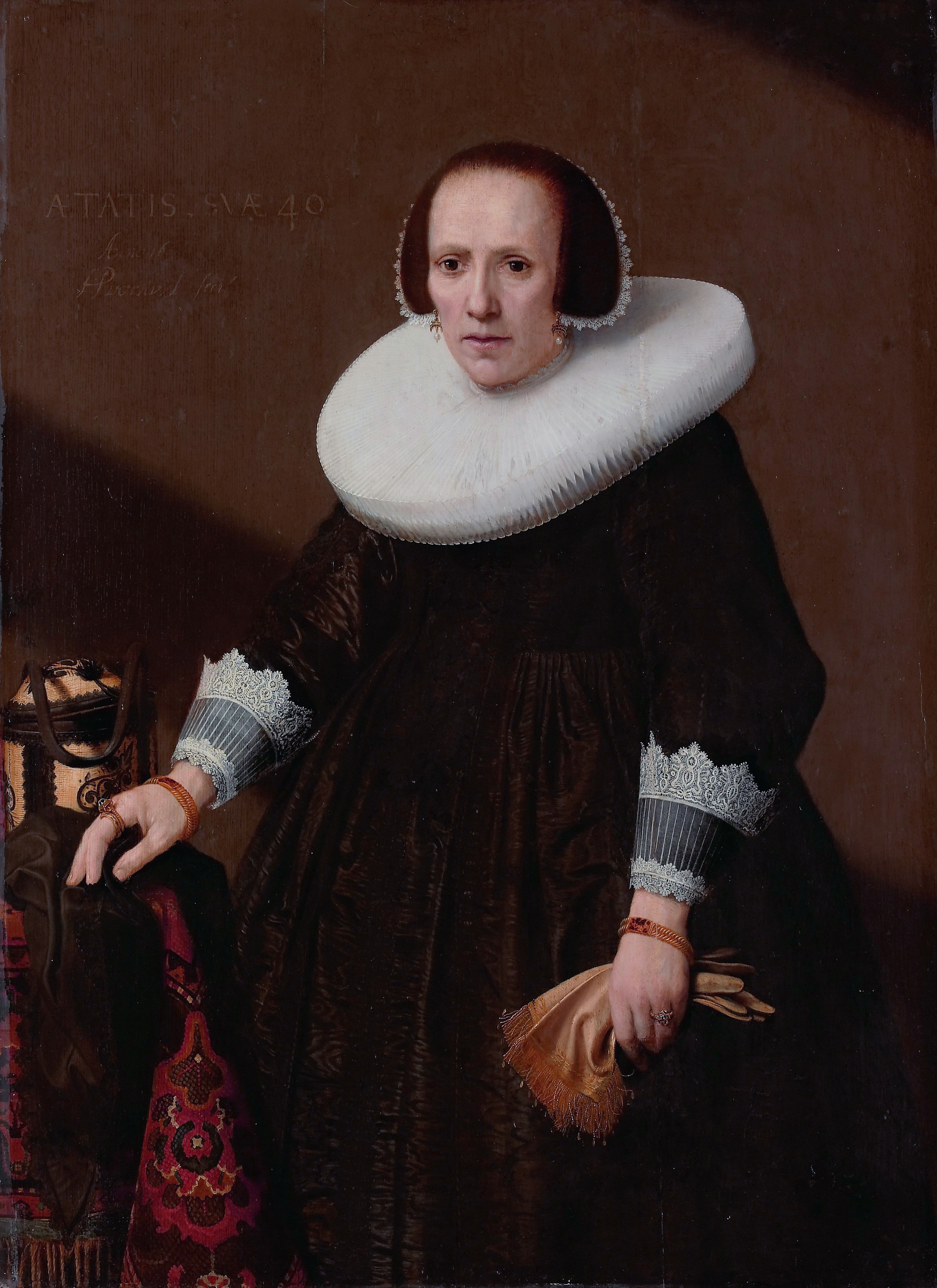
Geertruyd Reael, holding wedding gloves

He was probably the brother of the poet and playwright Meindert Pietersz. Voskuyl, who travelled to Paris and Norway. In 1616 Meindert wrote a poem in the album of the painter Wybrand de Geest in Paris and in 1624 he was in Rostock and Bergen in Norway on business for Johan Holthuysen. In the years 1635-1644 Meindert was a lieutenant and captain of a small warship on the Rhine. Possibly both Voskuijls travelled together, and possibly also with Pieter Isaacz in their early years, but both died in Amsterdam.
