= Joos van Winghe =

Flemish painter (1544–1603)

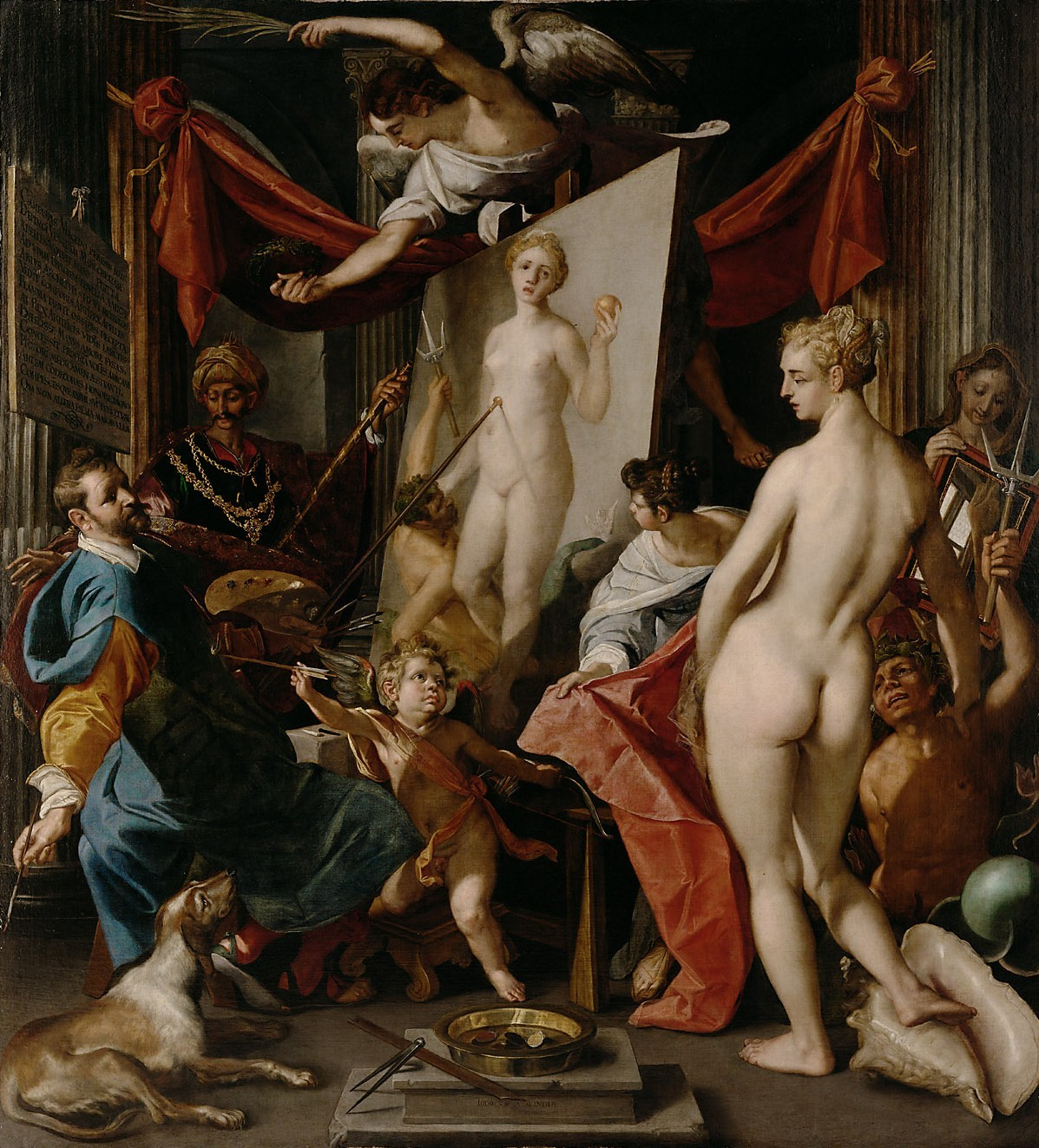
Apelles paints Campaspe before Alexander, featuring a self-portrait as Apelles

Joos van Winghe, Jodocus a Winghe or Jodocus van Winghen (1544–1603) was a Flemish painter and print designer. He is known for his history paintings, portraits, allegories and genre scenes, including merry companies. He worked in Brussels as court painter and left Flanders after the Fall of Antwerp in 1584. He then worked in Frankfurt for the remainder of his career. In Germany he enjoyed the patronage of Holy Roman emperor Rudolf II and adopted a more clearly Mannerist style.

== Life ==
The principal source on the life of Joos van Winghe is the Flemish contemporary art historian and artist Karel van Mander. Modern art historians treat van Mander's biographies of artists with circumspection. Van Mander recounts that van Winghe was born in Brussels in 1544. There is no independent information which can confirm this birth date.

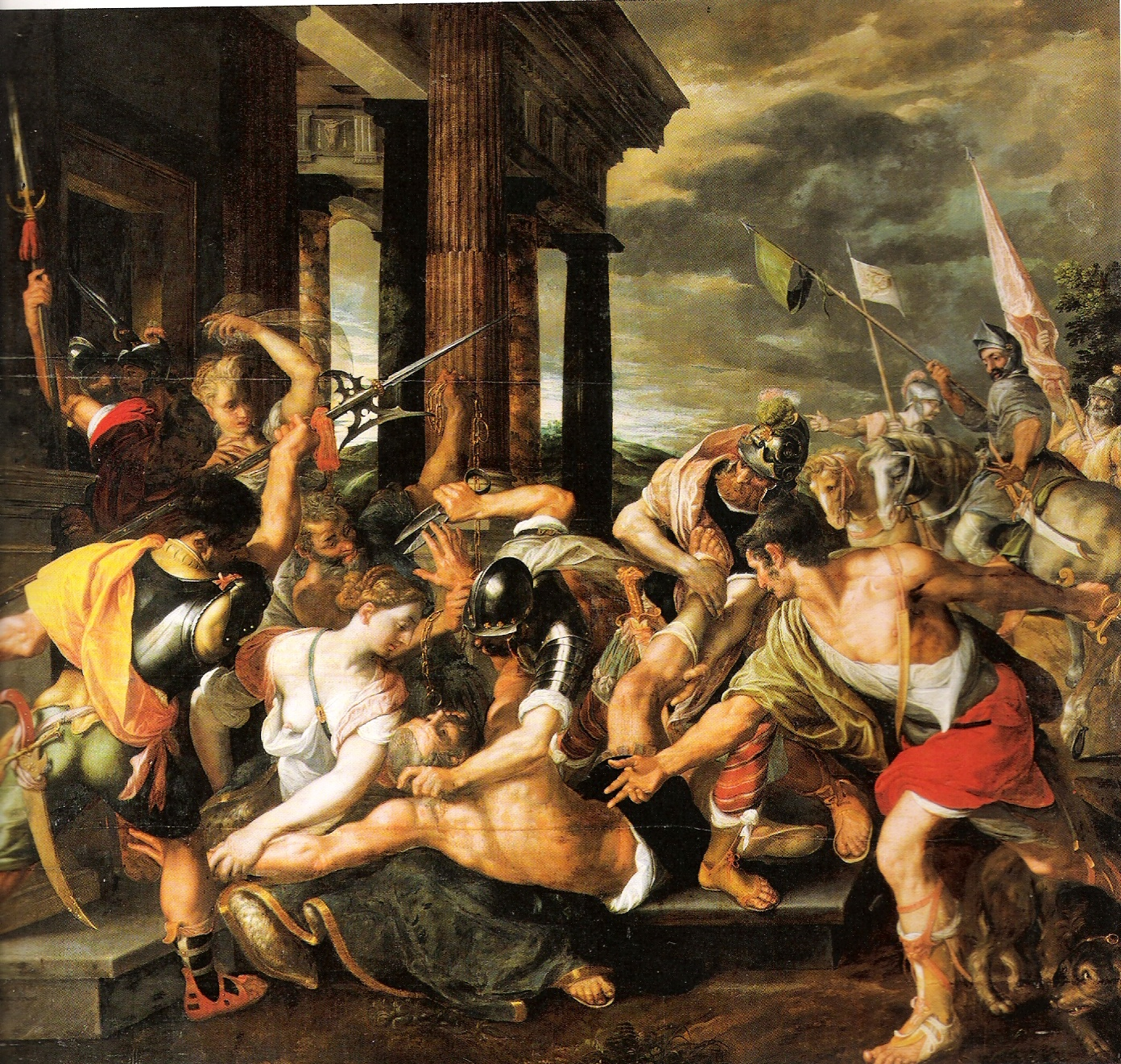
Delilas delivers Samson to the Philistines

Van Mander states that van Winghe traveled to Italy to further his studies. In Rome he lived with a cardinal for four years. Van Winghe spent time in Parma where he reportedly painted a fresco of the Last Supper in the refectory of the monastery of the Servites. He worked in the workshop of the Italian Mannerist painter Jacopo Bertoja who also employed the Flemish painter Bartholomaeus Spranger. Bertoja took van Winghe and Spranger to paint in the rooms of the Villa Farnese that he had been commissioned to finish. He also worked in Rome and Parma for Bertoja. A close friendship between Spranger and van Winghe must have developed during their time in Italy. A drawing by Spranger after a painting van Winghe, which has disappeared today, proves that the two artists remained in contact decades later, when Spranger had been court painter to Rudolph II in Prague for many years and van Winghe had settled in Frankfurt.

On his return trip he passed by Paris. He spent time at Fontainebleau where he was exposed to the Mannerist style of the School of Fontainebleau. His period of travel is situated between 1564 and 1568. Flemish painter Hendrick de Clerck may have been van Winghe's pupil during his stay in Italy.

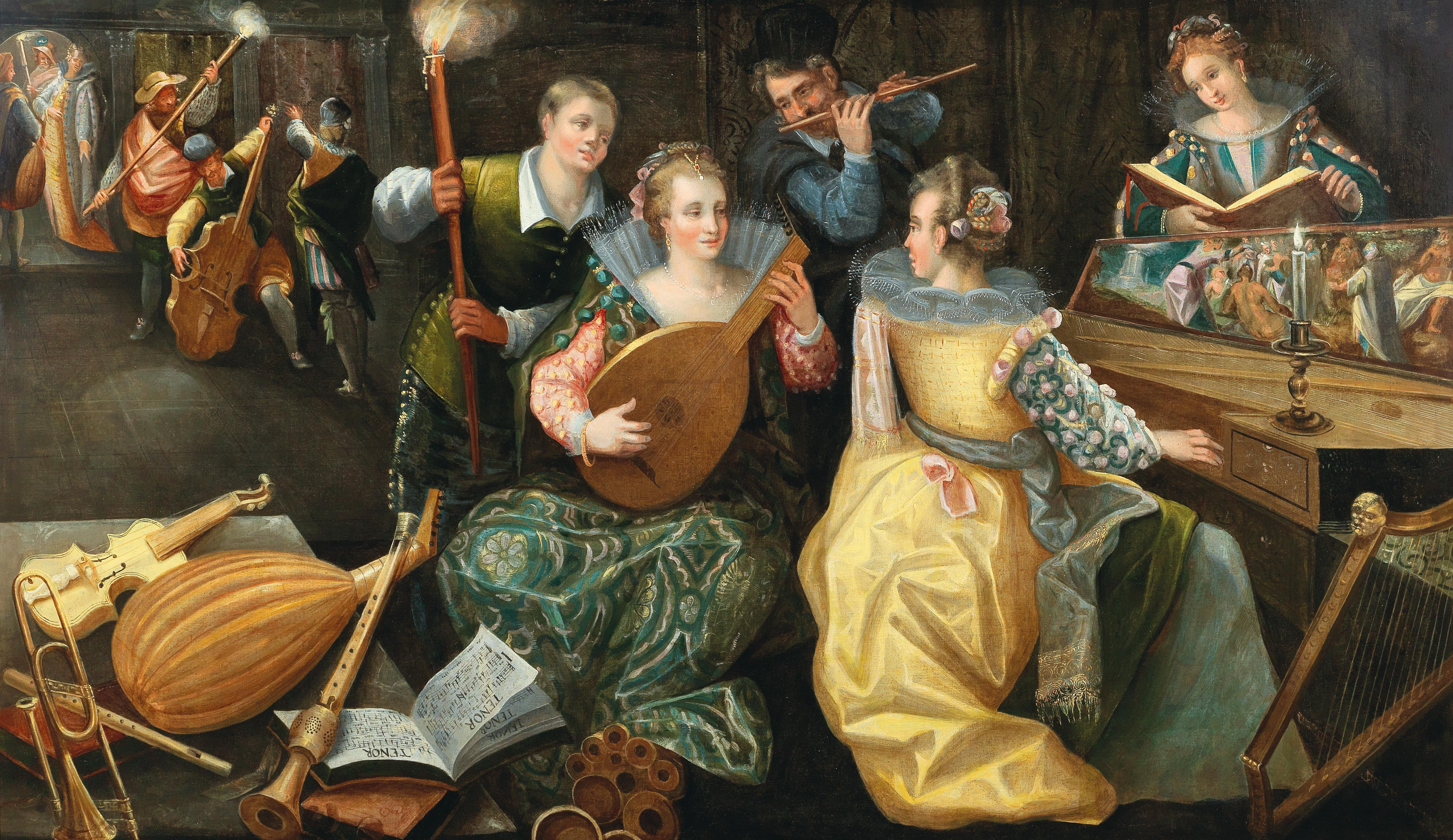
Elegant company, playing with torchlight

After his return to Brussels in 1568 he became court painter to Alexander Farnese, Duke of Parma, then the governor-general of the Spanish Netherlands. He created a number of religious compositions during his stay in Brussels. He married with Catharina van der Borcht, who was a member of the van der Borcht family of painters. Their son Jeremias van Winghe later became a painter. He left his home country with his family in 1584 after the Fall of Antwerp and his position as court painter was taken up by Otto van Veen. The fact that he left Flanders after the recapturing of Antwerp indicates that he was a Protestant. A painted allegory described by van Mander depicting a chained personification of Belgica, i.e. the Netherlands, supports the view that his emigration was politically motivated.

He settled in Frankfurt, where he became a citizen (burgher) in 1588. In Frankfurt he was part of the large contingent of Flemish artists who had left their home country for religious reasons, such as Hans Vredeman de Vries, Marten van Valckenborch and his sons Frederik van Valckenborch and Lucas van Valckenborch, Joris Hoefnagel and Jacob Hoefnagel. There were also a great number of Flemish printmakers in Frankfurt. Many of the artists were tied together through a network of family relationships established through intermarriage. The exiled artists regularly worked together on projects where each artist would contribute to a painting the portion in which they were specialised. For instance, a figure painter and still life painter would contribute respectively the figures and still life elements in a painting. The artists would also provide designs for the publications engraved by the Flemish printmakers established in Frankfurt. Van Winghe further maintained close relations with the group of Flemish artists in Frankenthal through Hendrik Gijsmans, with whom he was related by marriage, through his younger brother Maximilian van Winghe, who lived in Frankenthal and through his marriage to Catharina van der Borcht, which connected him with the painter family of van der Borcht. Van Winghe likely enjoyed the patronage of Holy Roman emperor Rudolf II thanks to his friend Spranger who was court painter. Spranger may have been instrumental in the purchase of van Winghe's painting Apelles paints Campaspe before Alexander for the imperial collection and a series of twelve apostles designed by him, which was dedicated to Archbishop Berka in Prague.

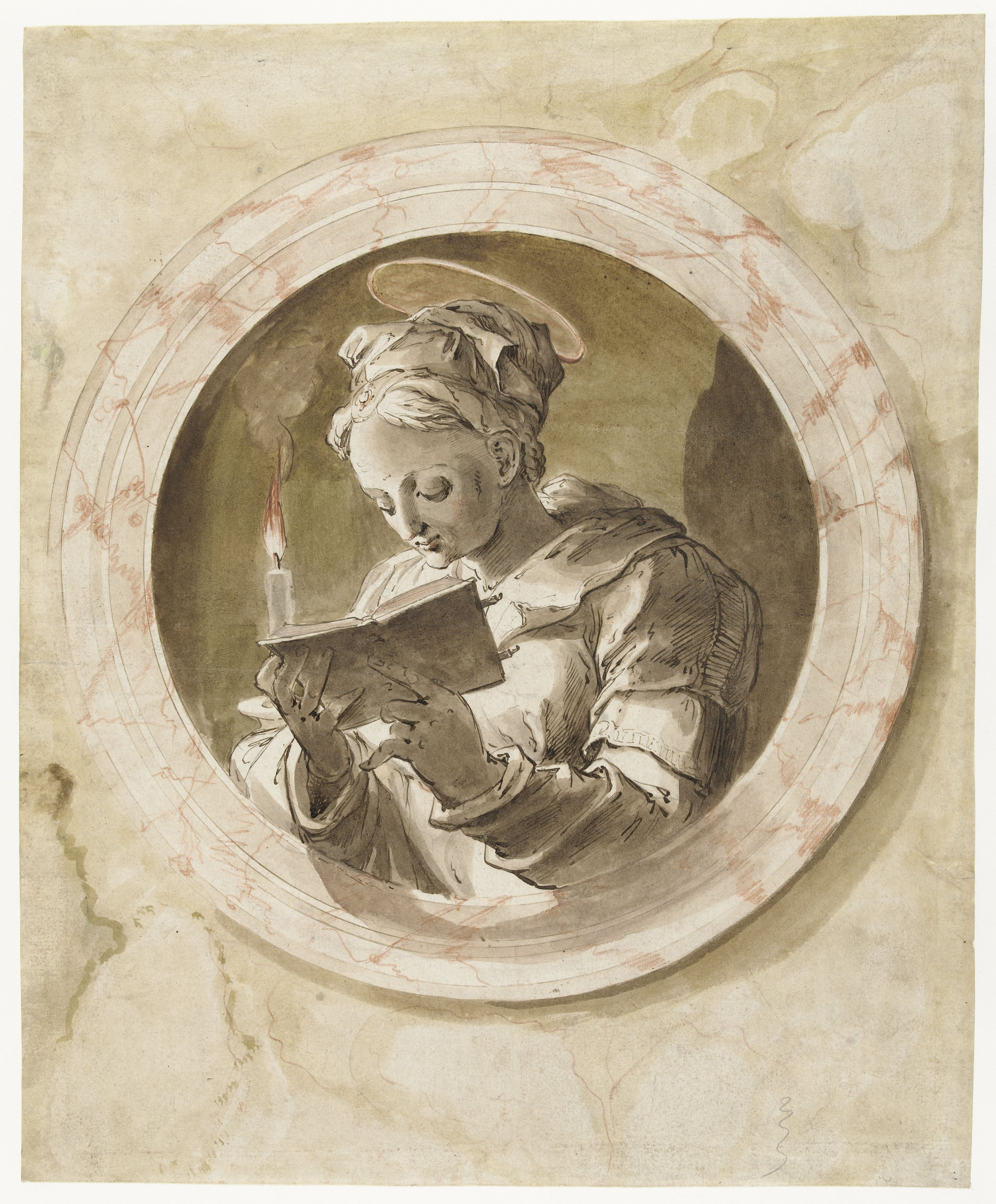
Mary Magdalene or Saint Agatha

He was the father of the painter Jeremias van Winghe who remained active in Frankfurt.

He died in Frankfurt in 1603.

== Work ==
=== General ===
He is known for religious works, allegories, portraits and genre works, as well as the designs of prints. Van Mander mentions several pieces by his hand in Brussels, Frankfurt and Amsterdam. It is on the basis of these paintings described by van Mander and works signed by the artist and a monogrammed drawing in Brussels, that a small body of paintings and drawings has been attributed to Joos van Winghe. Van Winghe was strongly influenced by Mannerism from central Italy and Venetian painting. His work was also influenced by the School of Fontainebleau, works of which he is believed to have studied on his return from Italy. In the 1590s, van Winghe worked in Frankfurt within the sphere of influence of the artists working at the court of emperor Rudolph II, including the Flemish painter Bartholomeus Spranger, court painter of Emperor Rudolf II in Prague, with whom he had collaborated during his period of residence in Rome.

=== Merry companies ===
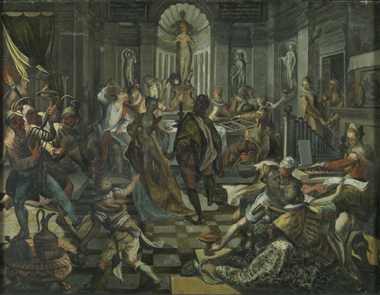
Nocturnal party and masquerade

Van Winghe painted a number of merry company scenes showing carnivals and nocturnal merry-makings. Examples are the Elegant company, playing with torchlight and the Tavern scene in the night recently on the art market that are attributed to him. They show interiors at night lit by torches. Musicians are performing music in both paintings. In the second painting men and women are engaged in card playing, drinking, smoking and kissing. That the venue is a brothel is clear from the surreptitious exchange of a purse of money between one of the men and an old woman. A painting hanging on the back wall shows the scene of the prodigal son eating pig swill. This shows that the painting is likely depicting a scene from the biblical story of the prodigal son during his time of high living. This was a common merry company subject in Netherlandish painting of which Jan Sanders van Hemessen painted one of the first expressions in 1536.

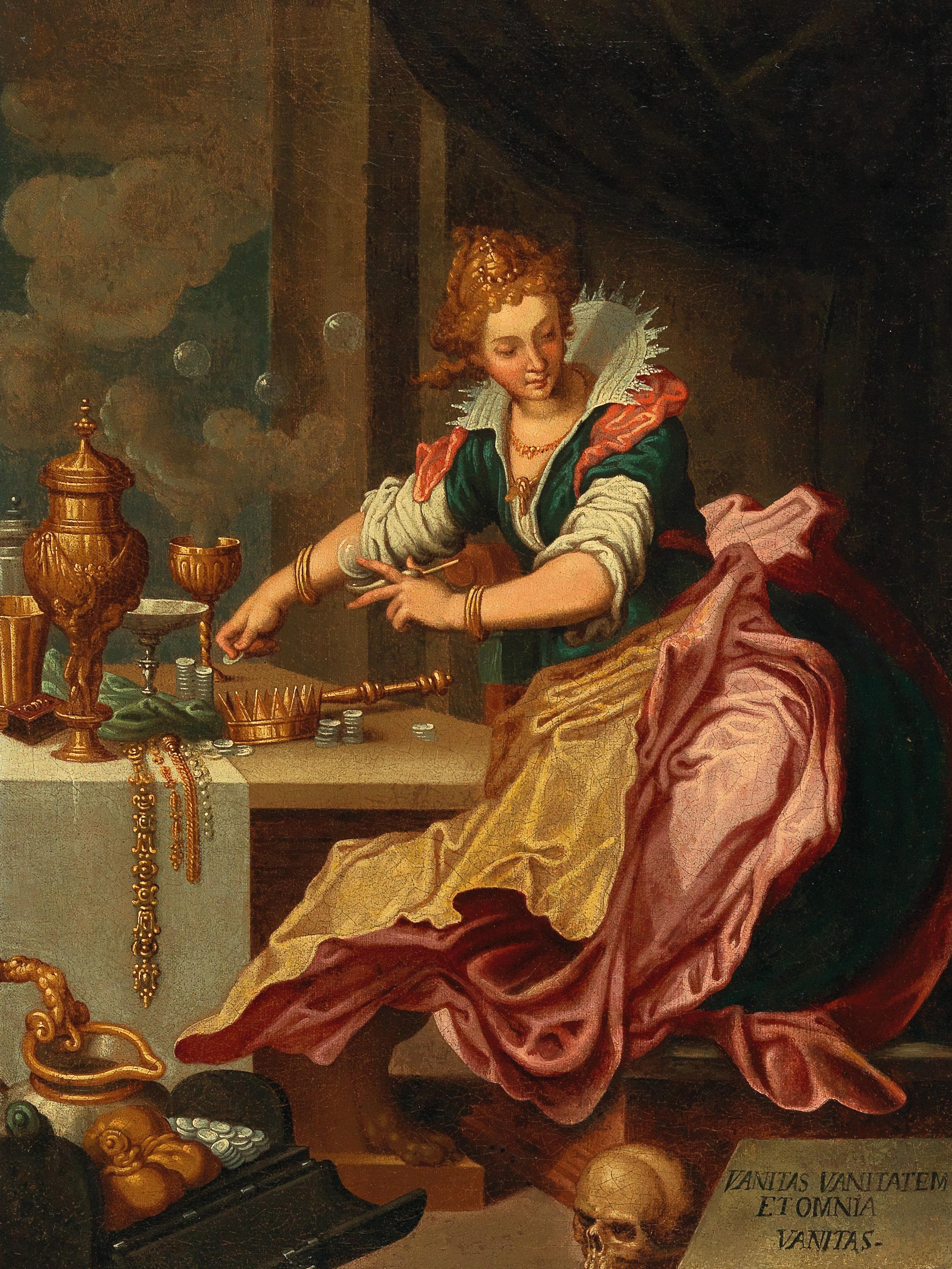
An Allegory of Vanity

Van Winghe created a few versions on the theme of a Nocturnal feast and masquerade, also referred to as The house of ill repute. The original version is likely the painting in the Royal Museums of Fine Arts of Belgium in Brussels. There is a drawing by van Winghe in the Kupferstich-Kabinett, Dresden. Jan Sadeler made an engraving after the work which is very close to the Brussels painting. Finally there is an anonymous painting in the Rijksmuseum in Amsterdam which differs from the drawing and engraving but is clearly inspired by van Winghe's creation. The Brussels painting shows an elegantly dressed party of people in a magnificent room. At the back of the room are statues in niches. The central niche is larger and contains a large statue of a female nude. In front are men and women engaged in drinking, games and courtship. On the right at the back of the room an old woman holding a purse is leading a young woman by the hand. In the foreground a woman plays an organ and men wearing masks play on lutes and sing. On both sides of the larger niche are two plates with Latin texts from the second Book of Wisdom, which point to the need to enjoy life. The Sadeler engraving carries at the bottom a text from the book of Sirach which warns from the danger of wine, women and prostitutes. The scene depicted in the painting and engraving illustrate the vices that are condemned by Sirach.

=== Allegories ===
The Mannerist painters had a preference for works with an allegorical meaning. Van Winghe was no exception to this and designed various allegorical works such as the Allegory of Vanity (Dorotheum, Vienna, 17 October 2017, lot 240) and the Fame hovering over the globe (Collection Lingenauber Monaco), which deal with fairly common allegorical themes. Other allegorical works have a political meaning such as the allegory described by van Mander depicting a chained personification of Belgica, i.e. the Netherlands.

He painted a few versions of the Apelles paints Campaspe before Alexander (two versions in the Kunsthistorisches Museum) of which one was painted on commission for emperor Rudolph II. The inspiration of the paintings was the story of Alexander who asks Apelles to paint his mistress Campaspe. When Alexander notes that Apelles has fallen in love with his model, Alexander decides to leave his mistress to the painter. This theme was regarded as an allegory of the relationship between ruler and artists at Rudolph's court where the ruler sacrificed his own passions in favour of art. Van Winghe used the erotic language typical for the art produced for the Rudolphine court. Van Winghe painted a self-portrait of himself as the painter whose arm is pierced by the arrow of Cupid. The Flemish painter Jacob Hoefnagel who worked at the Rudolphine court painted a miniature version of the story of Apelles and Campaspe, which was inspired by van Winghe's treatment of the subject.

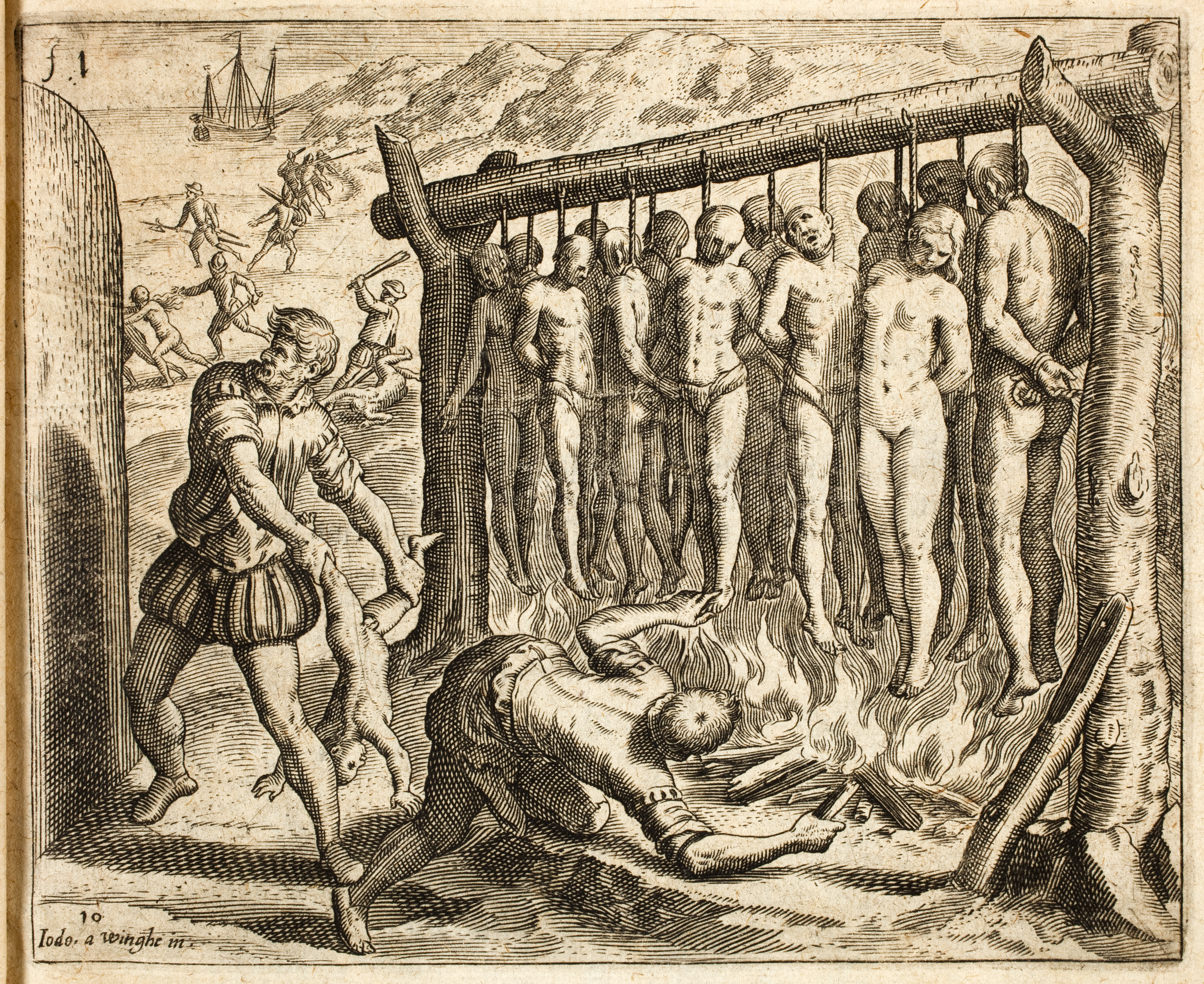
Hanging, burning and clubbing of Indians by Spanish soldiers from the Narratio regionum ...

=== Printed work ===
In Frankfurt van Winghe seems to have been mainly active as a draughtsman and designer of prints. He worked with the large community of engravers from his home country who had settled there such as Jan and Raphael Sadeler, Crispijn de Passe and Theodor de Bry. Van Winghe designed the illustrations for the first Latin translation (made after the French edition of 1579) of Bartolomé de las Casas' Brevísima relación de la destrucción de las Indias which described the cruel treatment of the indigenous population in America. The book was published in 1598 in Frankfurt by Theodor de Bry (who also engraved the prints) and Johann Saur under the title Narratio regionum Indicarum per Hispanos quosdam deuastatarum verissima.

He designed a series of 12 apostles and Christ for Archbishop Berka in Prague, which were engraved by the Flemish engraver Johan Bara.
