= Adriaen van Nieulandt =

Dutch painter, draughtsman and engraver (1587–1658)

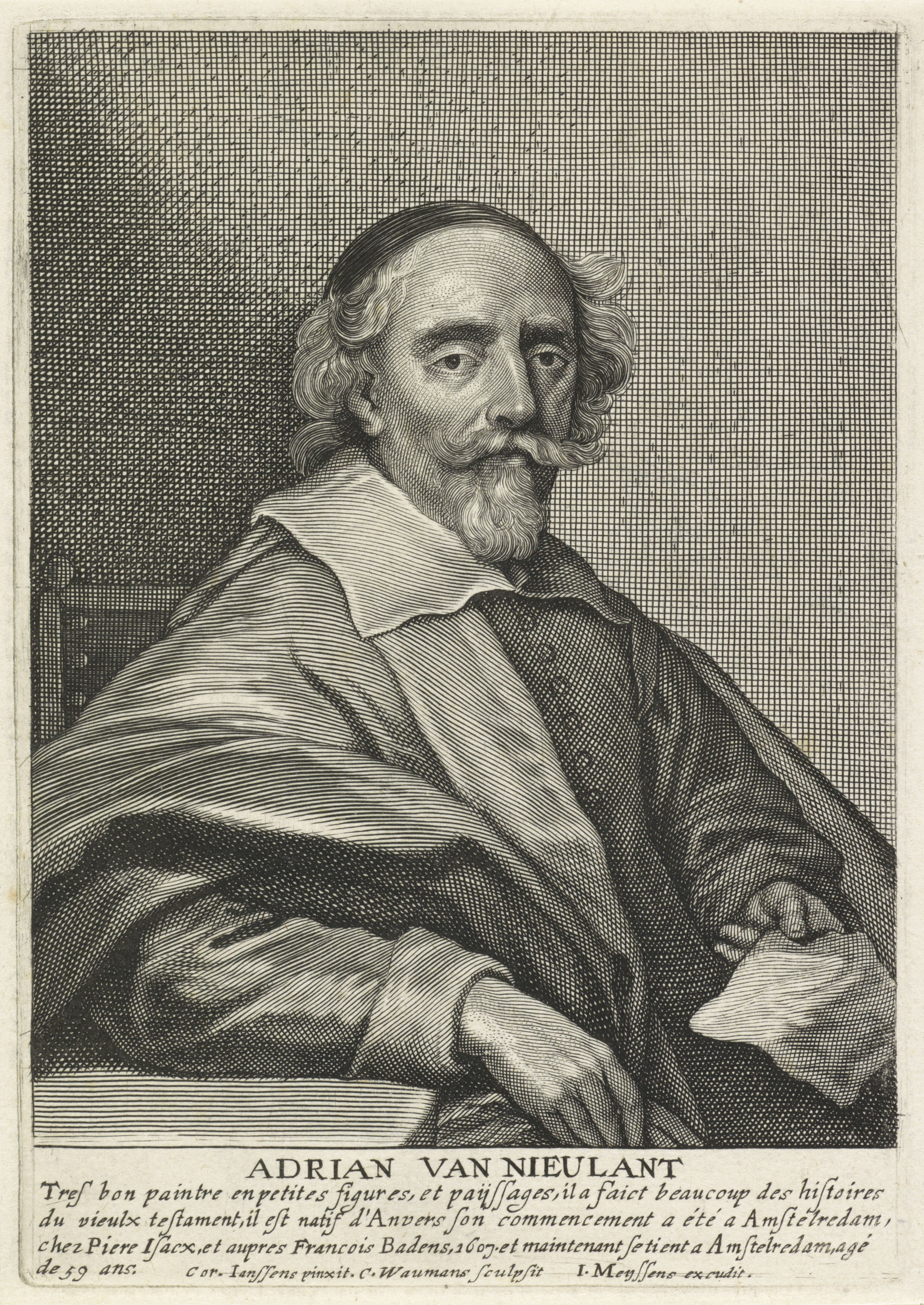
Adriaen van Nieuwlandt after a portrait by Cornelius Johnson in Het Gulden Cabinet.

Adriaen van Nieulandt (1586 or 1587, Antwerp - buried 7 July 1658, Amsterdam) was a Dutch painter, draughtsman and engraver of Flemish descent. He is known for his history paintings with biblical and mythological subjects, often incorporating elegant nudes, portraits including schutterstukken, genre paintings and still lifes.

== Life ==
He was born in Antwerp in 1586 or 1587 as the son of Adriaen van Nieulandt the elder (died 1603) and Geertruyd Loyson (died ca. 1627). His father was a merchant dealing in quills as was his grandfather who was also admitted as a master of the Guild of Saint Luke of Antwerp in 1573. His family included a number of artists including his uncle Guilliam or Willem van Nieulandt (I) who was a painter and draftsperson. His older brother Willem van Nieulandt II (born in 1582 or 1584 in Antwerp) became a painter, engraver, poet and playwright and was active in both Antwerp and Amsterdam.

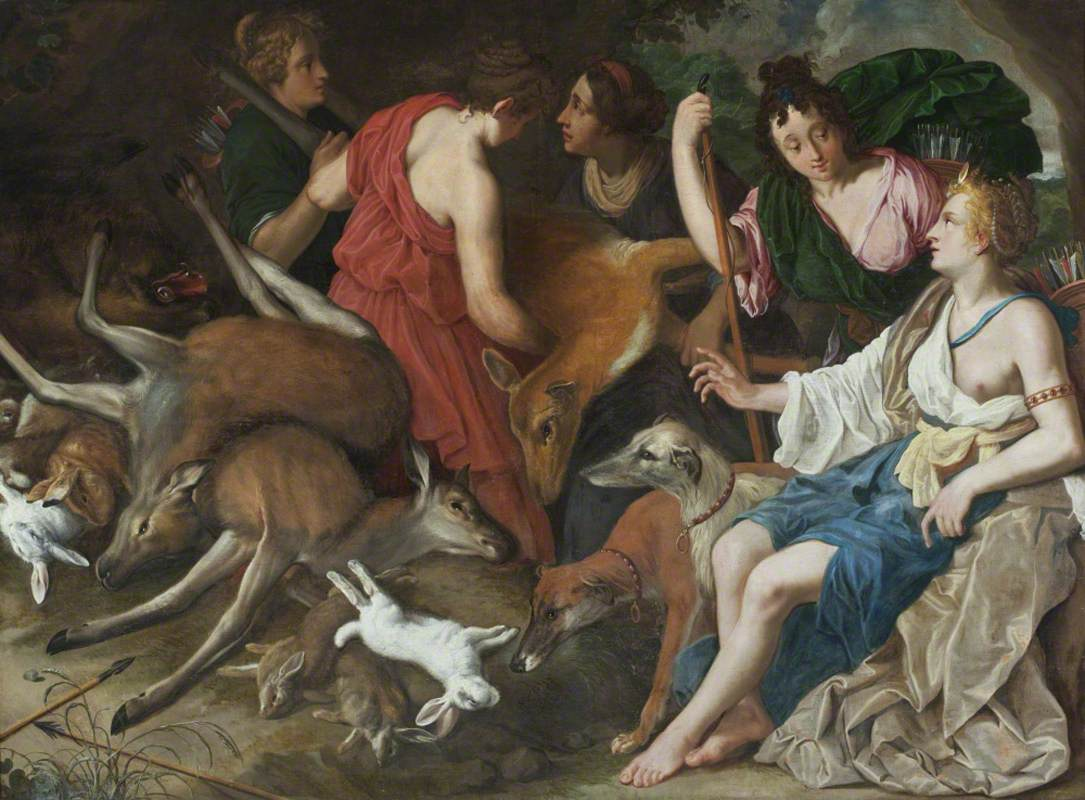
Diana with her Nymphs

The van Nielandt family moved to Amsterdam in 1589, after the Fall of Antwerp, possibly because they were Protestants or simply for economic reasons, as the art market in the Northern Netherlands was doing very well at the time. Another brother called Jacob van Nieulandt was born in 1593/94 in Amsterdam where he became an art dealer, painter, innkeeper and draftsperson. Father van Nieulandt became a poorter of Amsterdam in 1594, which shows that he was of good means.

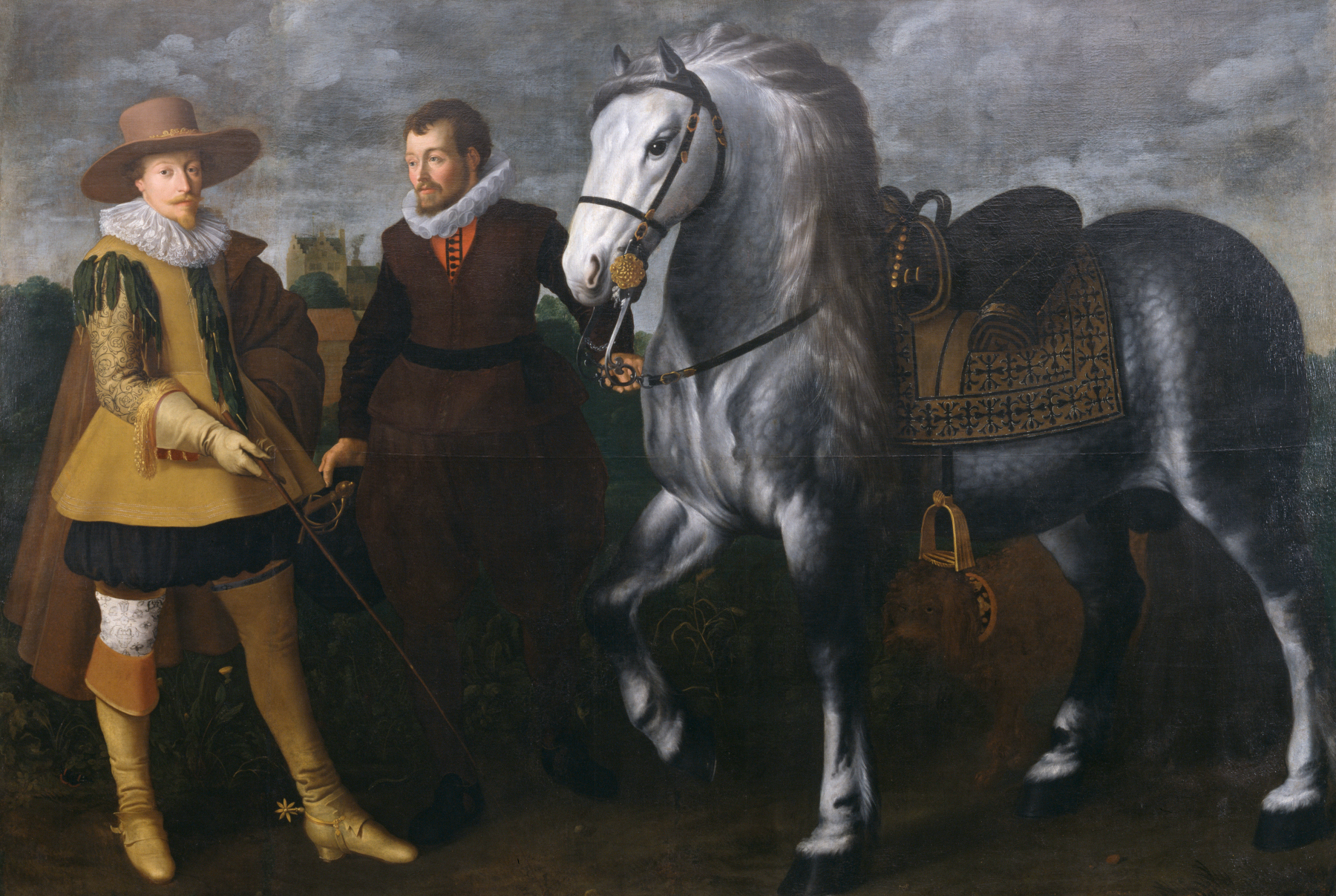
Portrait of Maurice, Prince of Orange The Walters Art Museum.

Adriaen Jr. was in Amsterdam first a pupil of Pieter Isaacsz (1569–1625), an artist born in Denmark from Dutch parents but married to a woman born in Antwerp, and subsequently of Frans Badens (1571–1618), originally from Antwerp. These two masters had studied in Italy and were able to pass on to him their knowledge of new trends in European painting. He attained quite a reputation early in his career and was given a commission by Danish king Christian IV for 23 paintings on copper plates with New Testament subjects.

According to Houbraken, he specialized in painting statuary and landscapes. According to Cornelis de Bie's Het Gulden Cabinet, he also made many scenes from the Old Testament.

== Public collections ==
- Rijksmuseum, Amsterdam
- Amsterdam Museum, Amsterdam
- Frans Hals Museum, Haarlem
- Museum de Fundatie, Zwolle
- Hessisches Landesmuseum Darmstadt, Darmstadt
- Herzog Anton Ulrich Museum, Braunschweig
