= Jeremias van Winghe =

Flemish painter

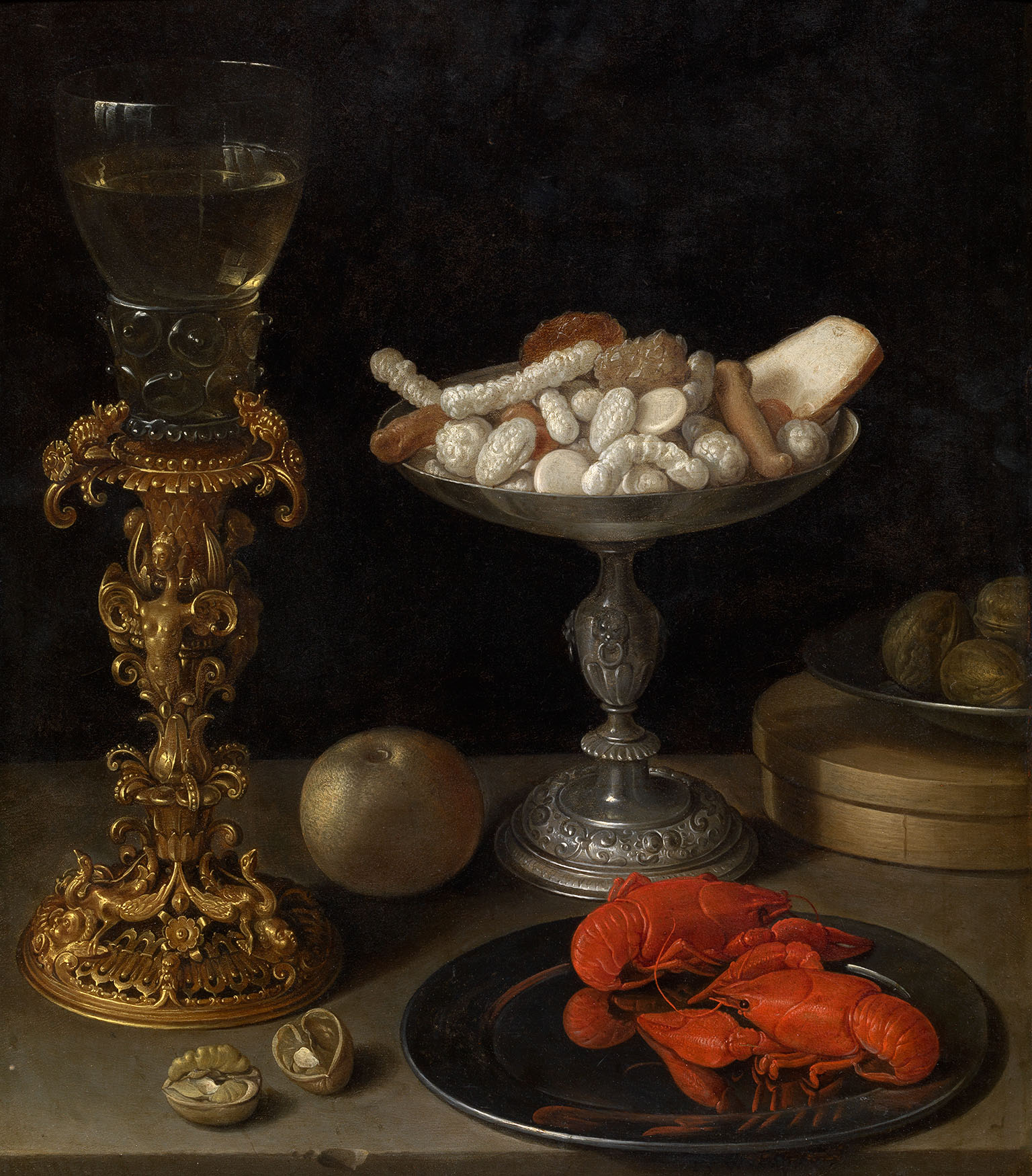
Still life

Jeremias van Winghe (1578, Brussels – 1645, Frankfurt am Main) was a Flemish painter known for his portraits, genre scenes, kitchen scenes and still life paintings. After training in Brussels and Amsterdam, he was mainly active in Frankfurt am Main.

== Life ==
Jeremias van Winghe was born in Brussels in 1578 as the son of Joos van Winghe. His father was a painter who had studied in Italy and had become court painter to Alexander Farnese, Duke of Parma in Brussels. The family van Winghe left the Southern Netherlands in 1584, possibly because of the Spanish repression at that time. They established themselves in Frankfurt am Main. Jeremias van Winghe likely started his training with his father.

Van Winghe initially trained as a portrait painter. When his father died in 1603, he went to study with the Flemish painter Frans Badens who resided in Amsterdam.

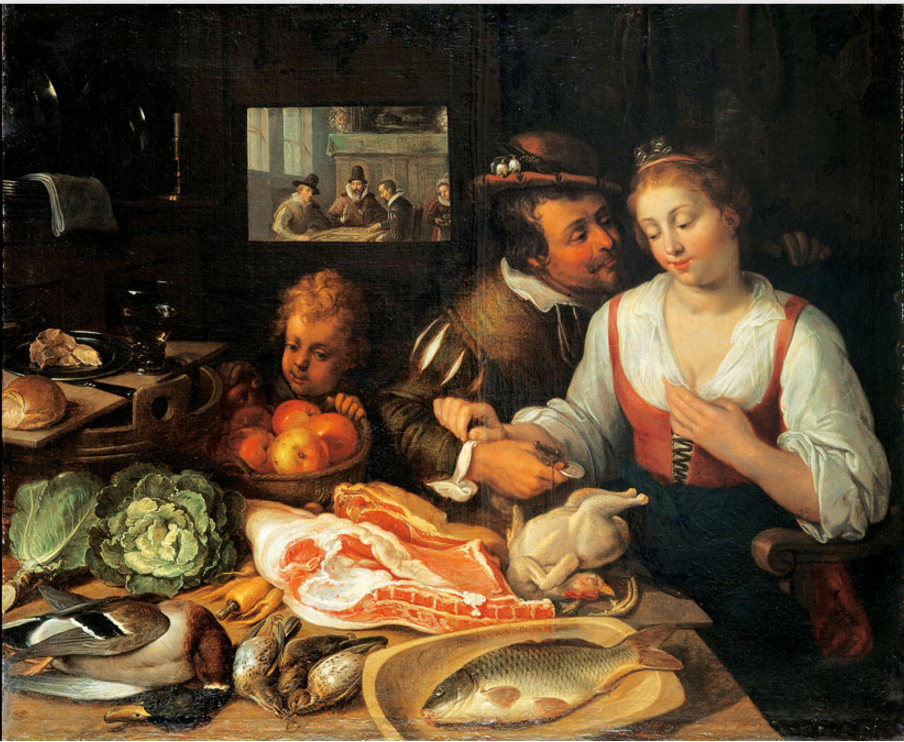
Kitchen Scene

After spending time in Italy, Jeremias van Winghe established himself in Frankfurt am Main. In addition to portraits he also painted highly finished and beautifully executed still lifes, at a time when this subject matter was still fairly unexplored. He must have been among the first artists to introduce this type of painting to Frankfurt. On marrying Anne Maria Mertens, the daughter of a jeweller, in 1616, he largely abandoned painting in favour of working in his father-in-law's business. He returned to painting later around 1640, and the break in his artistic activity partially explains the scarcity of his known oeuvre.

== Work ==
Jeremias van Winghe's work is not very well known. He started his career as a draughtsman of pen drawings but then developed into a figural and portrait painter. He was also an accomplished still life painter and painter of kitchen scenes.

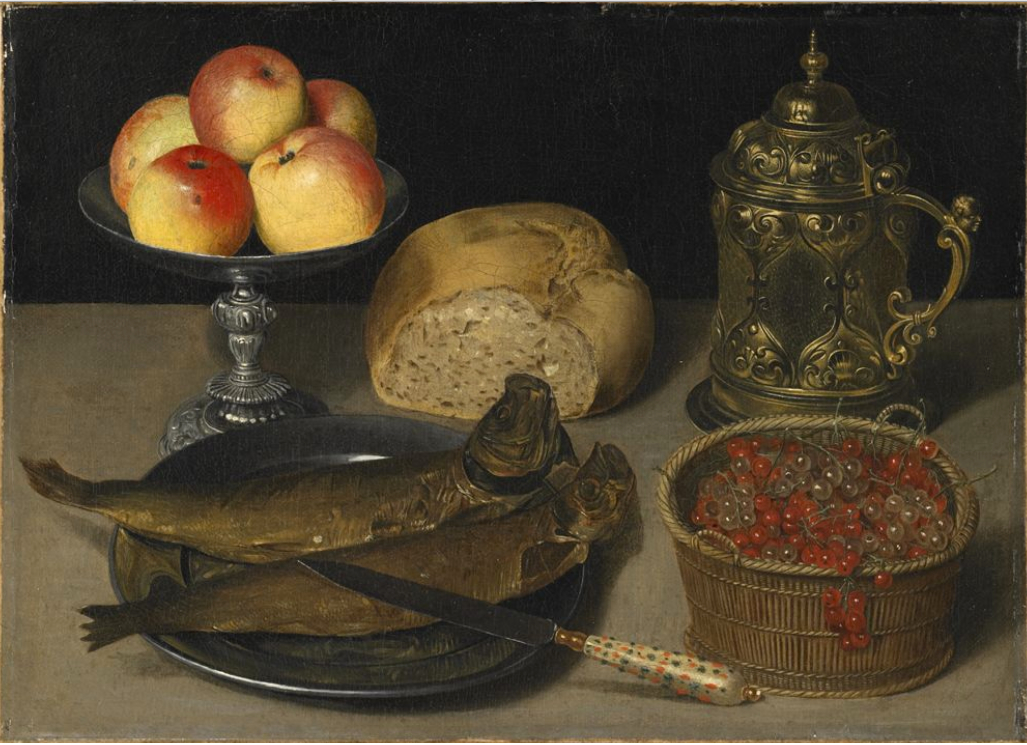
Still life

A Kitchen still life in the Historical Museum, Frankfurt, which is signed and dated 'IERAMIA. VAN.WINGE. FECIT.1613', is a key work in establishing a number of attributions to the artist, including A kitchen interior with a maid preparing meat and gentlemen drinking at a table beyond (Christie's, 8 December 2004, lot 30). Both works depict a table laden with food. In the latter painting a maid is busy in a kitchen while in the background a large room is visible with two men and women sitting at a table apparently drinking wine. In the Frankfurt painting a maid is shown pushing away an eager suitor who offers her a silver coin. Through a hatch in the back wall three men can be seen sitting at a table playing backgammon. These kitchen scenes of van Winghe stand in the tradition of the kitchen and market still-life scenes developed by Pieter Aertsen and Joachim Beuckelaer in Antwerp in the 16th century. As in these earlier works, van Winghe juxtaposes a sumptuous display of foodstuffs with a narrative scene in the background. Through the monumental forms of the maid and the dynamic still-life elements his kitchen scenes show van Winghe's familiarity with similarly themed works by the 17th century Baroque still life painter Frans Snyders.

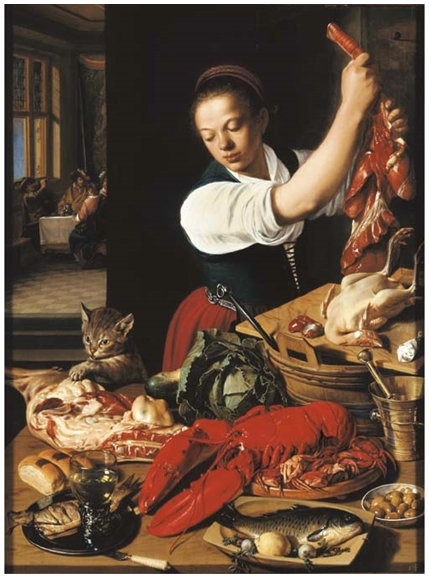
Kitchen interior with a maid

Another specialty of van Winghe were banquet type still lifes. An example is the composition A roemer on a silver-gilt bekerschroef, sweetmeats in a silver tazza, langoustines on a plate (dated 1607, at Christie's on 5–6 July 2007, London, lot 9). This work, which is signed with the initials 'IVW', had previously been attributed to Jacob van Walscapelle. This composition depicts diverse objects, that have been carefully placed on a tabletop and are brightly lit against a dark background. In this work van Winghe demonstrates his technical mastery in the rendering of diverse objects such as a silver tazza with sweetmeats, a silver-gilt German bekerschroef with designs of chameleons, swans and cherubs, surmounted by a half-filled roemer, two langoustines on a silver plate, walnuts, an apple and a wooden box, all placed on a marble-topped table. Van Winghe shows off his magnificent skills of observation in the small details, such as the reflection of the langoustines in the plate, the chameleons which grasp the foot of the roemer and the small chip on the edge of the tabletop. Van Winghe was able to merge these disparate elements into a harmonious composition. This type of still life had no obvious parallel at the time and appears to prefigure the work of artists such as Osias Beert, Georg Flegel and Peter Binoit.

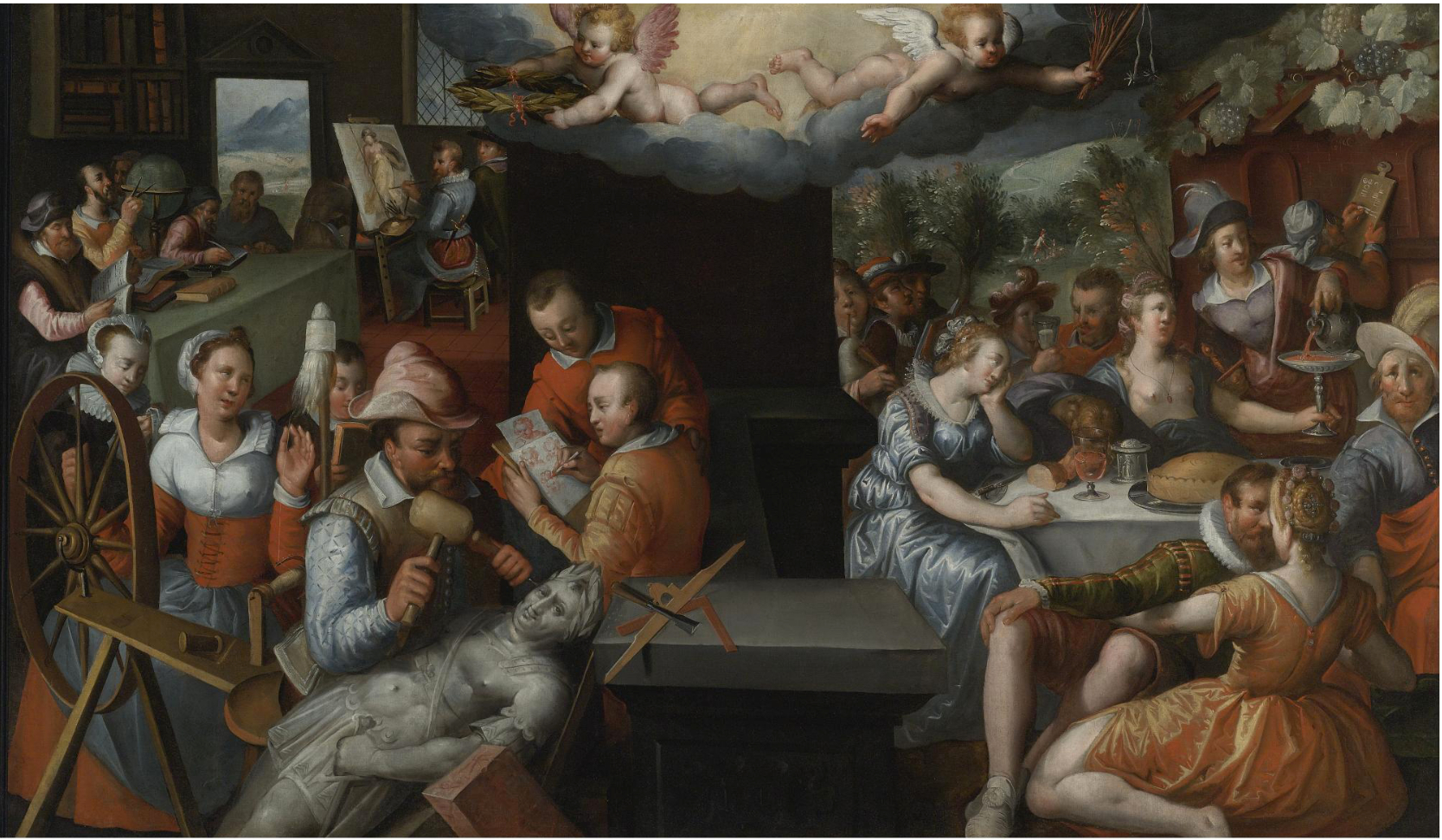
The glorification of art and diligence

To van Winghe has also been attributed an allegorical scene, depicting virtue and vice referred to as The glorification of art and diligence and the punishment of gluttony and earthly pleasure (At Sotheby's on 29–30 January 2009, New York City, lot 111). In this composition Virtue is represented on the left by various people engaged in productive and scholarly activities. The Arts are shown in the centre through artists at work such as a sculptor carving a statue, two men sketching and a painter at the easel in the background. Vice is depicted on the right by a multitude of greedy individuals drinking alcohol, a half-naked woman, music playing and large amounts of food. A tazza placed in the middle of the Vice scene in allows van Winghe to show off his skills as a still-life painter. The tazza is very close to the still life composition A roemer on a silver-gilt bekerschroef, sweetmeats in a silver tazza, langoustines on a plate discussed above. Two angels flying overhead embody the rewards and punishments to be meted out to those who are virtuous or given over to vicious pursuits.

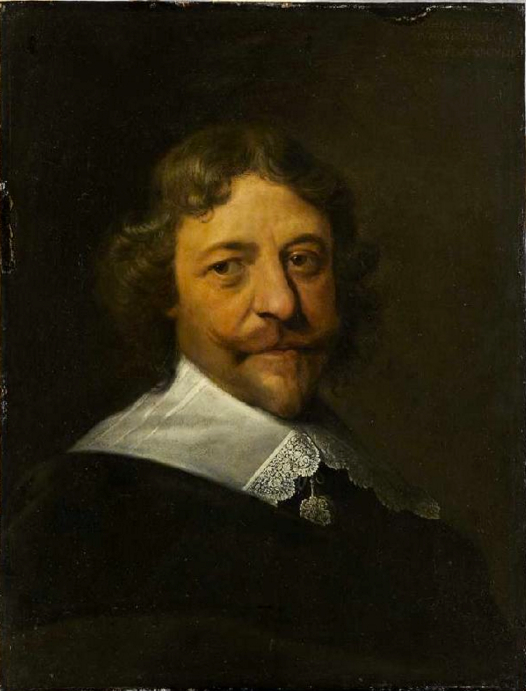
Portrait of Johann Maximilian zum Jungen

The portrait work of van Winghe is less well known. Five portraits by his hand are known. Two of these representing portraits of a couple are recorded but their current location is not known. A religious painting of the Crucifixion has also been attributed to Jeremias van Winghe (At Roberts Simon).
