= Johan Bara =

Dutch painter, designer and engraver

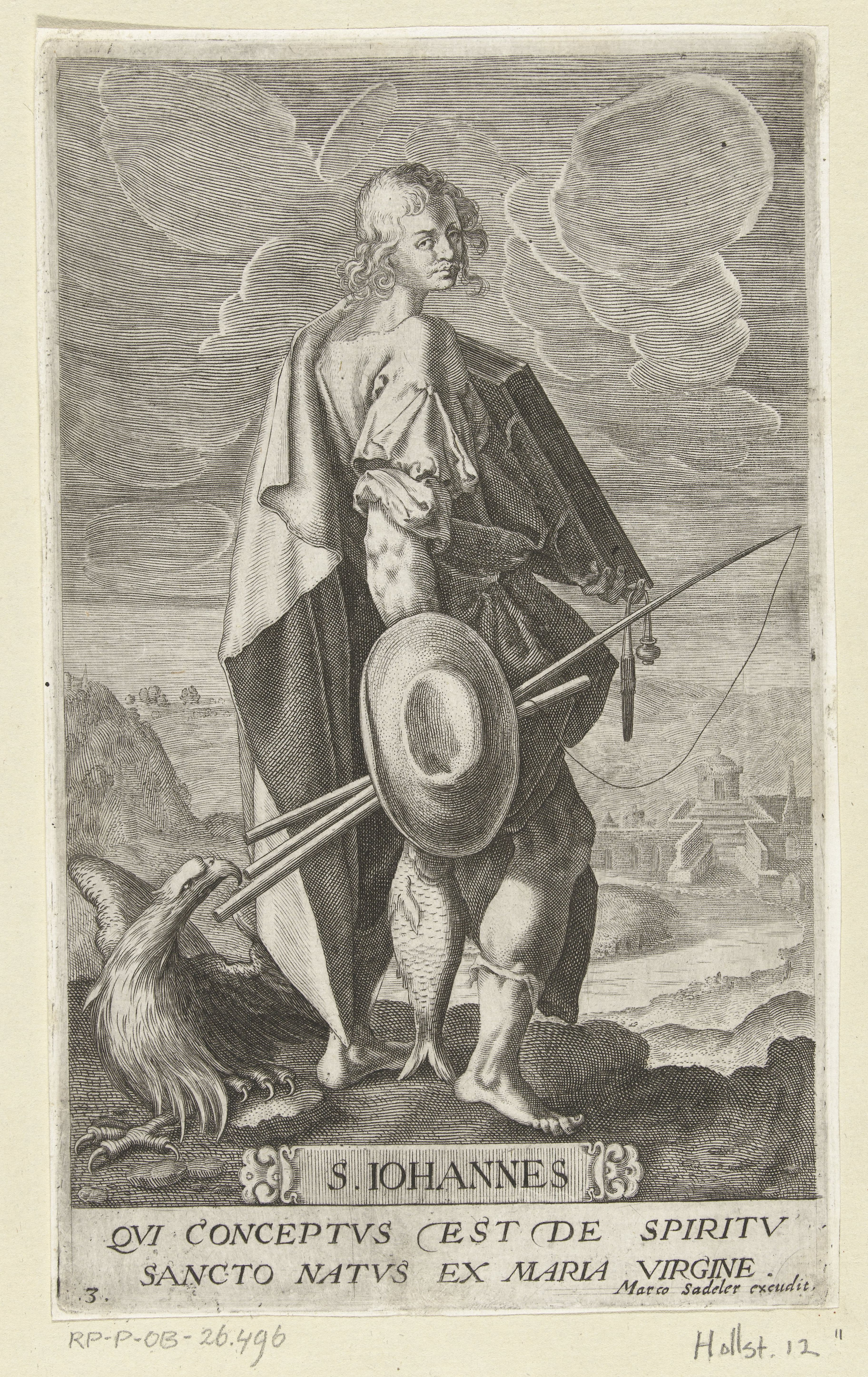
Apostle and evangelist John with fishing rod and eagle engraved by Johan Barra, after Joos van Winghe

Johan Bara or Johannes Barra (1581–1634) was a Dutch painter, designer and engraver.

== Life ==
Barra was probably born in 's-Hertogenbosch or Middelburg. He was active in Augsburg and Neurenberg in 1599, in Middelburg in 1604, in London between 1624 and 1627, in Amsterdam in 1631, and back in London in 1634, where he died.

He called himself, sometimes, "sculptor et vitrearum imaginum pictor", and published, from 1598 to 1632, several engravings which resemble, without equalling, those of Aegidius Sadeler. His first plate, "Susanna in the Bath", signed Barra (1598), is very rare. His plates are numerous.
