= Pieter Isaacsz =

Danish-born Dutch painter

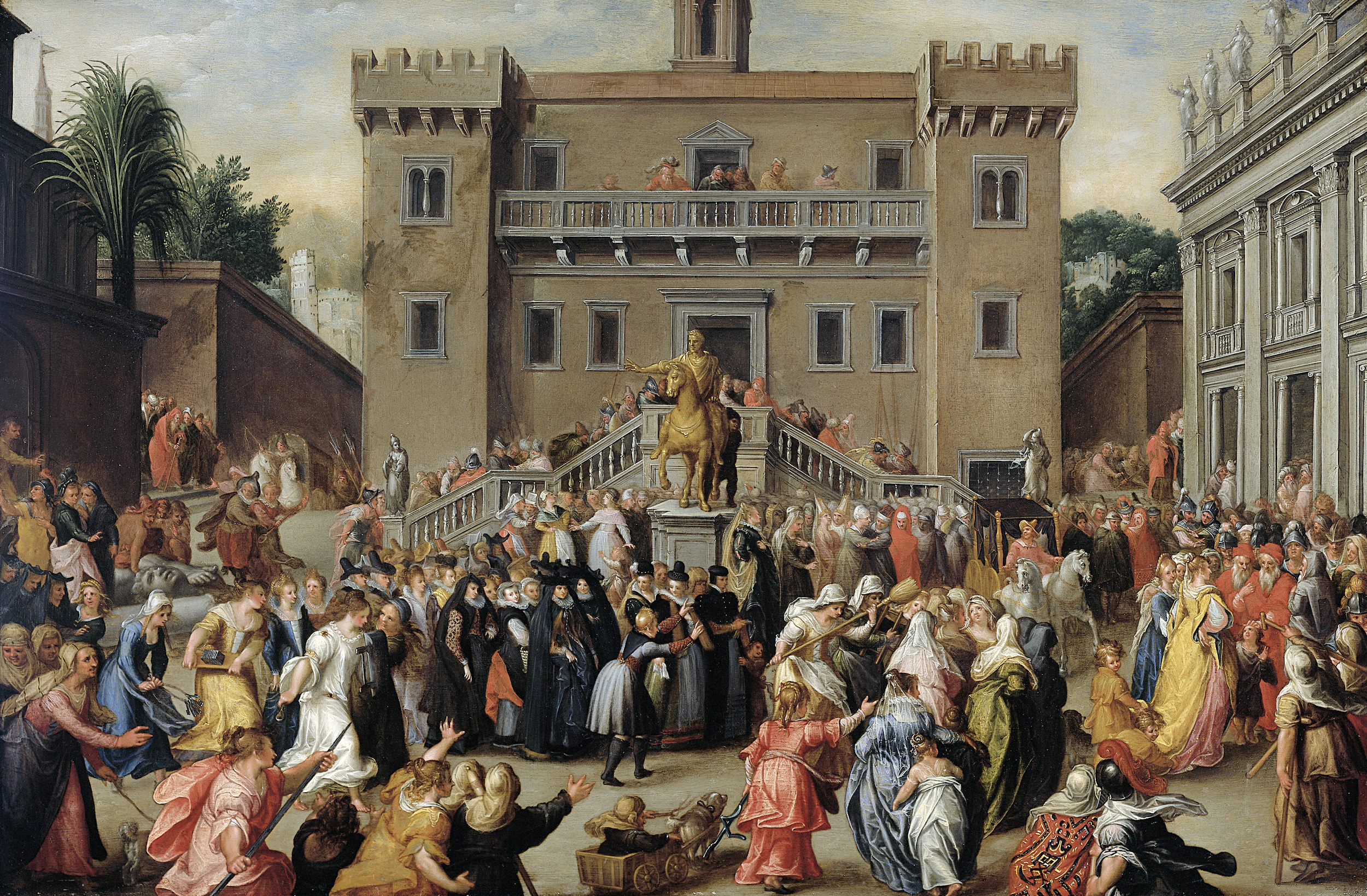
Procession of angry women in Rome after being told by the young Papirus (visible on the right between his mother in yellow and the senators in red) the rumour that the Senate decided each man could marry twice (1604).

Pieter Isaacsz (ca 1569, Helsingør – 14 September 1625) was a Danish court and portrait painter from Dutch origin who worked in a mannerist style on historical, biblical and mythological subjects. He was also a tapestry designer and art-dealer who spied for both the Netherlands, Denmark, and, eventually, for Sweden.

== Biography ==
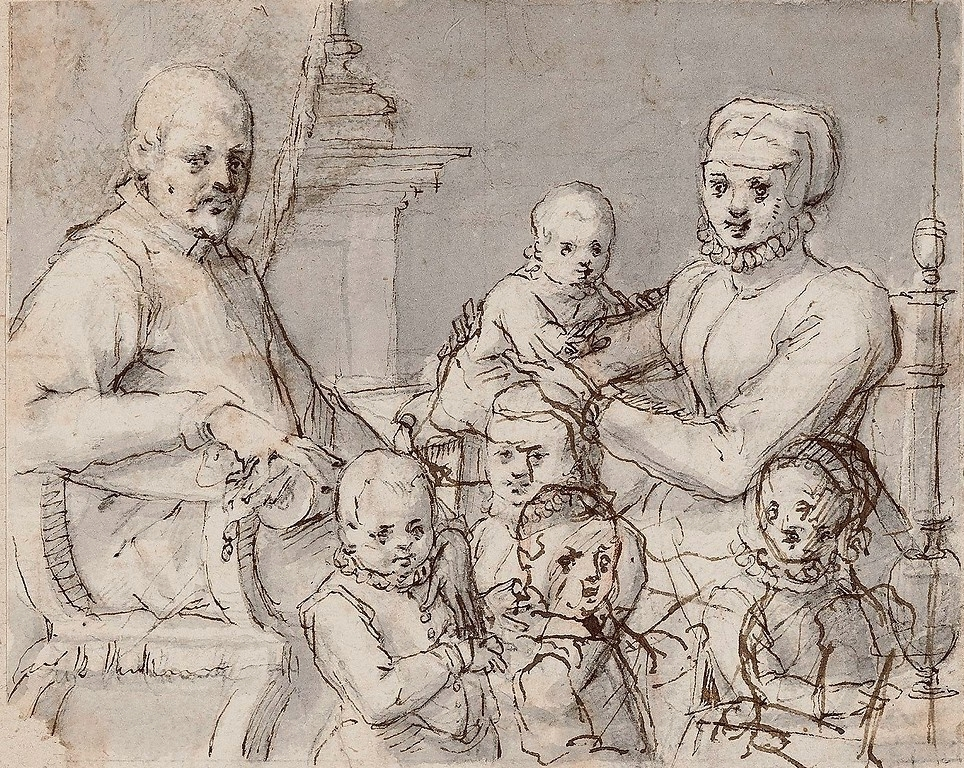
Family portrait by Isaacsz of his brother?

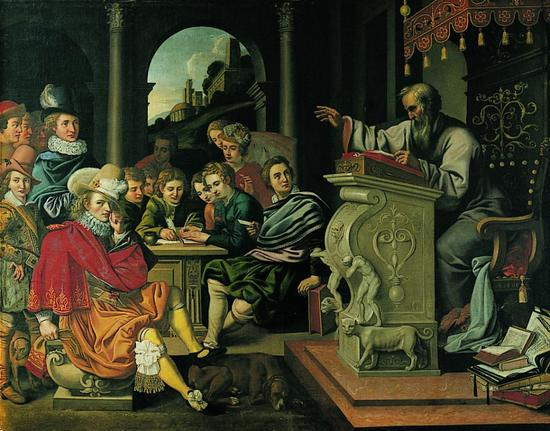
A lecture in an Equestrian Academy, painted by Reinhold Timm, who taught at Sorø from 1623, or Pieter Isaacsz for Rosenborg Castle; part of a series of seven paintings depicting the seven Liberal arts, here rhetoric.

Pieter was born in c. 1569 in Helsingør, the son of Helena Backer (also known as Heyltje Roelofs) and Isaac Pietersz, a merchant from Haarlem who first supplied the Danish court and was then appointed commissioner for the States General of the Netherlands at the Sound toll. He was stationed in[Helsingør and assisted Dutch and Danish merchants in legal cases. Around 1578/1580 the family came back to Amsterdam; his father remarried in 1581. According to Flemish art historian Karel van Mander, Pieter Isaacsz spent a year and a half learning to paint under the instruction of Cornelis Ketel. Isaacz then traveled to Italy where he became the pupil of Hans von Aachen whom he followed on his travels in Italy and Germany. Pieter and Hans visited Venice and Florence between 1585 and 1587 and Rome in 1590. He then turned back the Netherlands; his companion stayed in Prague in the service of the King of Bohemia.

In 1593, he married Susanna Crayborn from Antwerp; the couple had several daughters and one son Isaack, whose baptism was witnessed by Joris Hoefnagel. Pieter Isaacsz cooperated with Paul Vredeman de Vries a connoisseur of perspective, and Hendrick de Keyser. He became the teacher of Pieter Lastman, and Adriaen van Nieulandt, according to Arnold Houbraken. After the Kalmar War he was given his father's position (-1615) as an inspector general for the Sound toll in 1617-1625. In 1619, however, he was criticized for not sending reports for two years. In 1620 he was appointed in Swedish service of Gustav II Adolph or Axel Oxenstierna. Isaacsz was very well rewarded for his intelligence work. The payments were hidden away among the fees for the paintings he sent to Sweden. For five years he maintained this double life. Isaacsz wrote a total of 58 reports on everything from military building plans to visits by foreign diplomats, the Sont toll and much court gossip.

From 1604 Pieter lived at Sint Antoniesbreestraat, opposite Zuiderkerk in a house called "Kronenborg". His adventurous son, a painter and art dealer was mentioned in the will in June 1625. Three months later he died during the Great Northern War plague outbreak. He was buried in St. Olaf's Church, Helsingør.

== Works ==
Pieter owned a copy of a tronie of Titian by Dirck Barendsz, painted several schuttersstukken with many locals from Dutch Golden Age. Twice he visited Denmark as Christian IV's court painter. The first time 1607-10 he worked on the great hall of Rosenborg Castle, a demonstration of Amsterdam history painting at that moment in time. Isaacsz made good use of his position as a royal art buyer and furnished the castles with many of his own old works, which were bought at a hefty price. In pursuit of this task he was repeatedly in the Dutch Republic, usually in the company of a few Danish pupils for whose artistic training he was responsible. The second time he lived in Copenhagen and worked at Frederiksborg Castle. In 1616 he went back to Amsterdam, and bought dozens of paintings for the Danish king. In 1618 his brother Johan Pontanus, a professor in Harderwijk, was appointed as royal historian, with the task to write a history of Denmark in Latin.

== Legacy ==
He is remembered as one of the first artists who placed the model freely in a landscape. His pupils was Hendrick Avercamp and Huijgh Pietersz. Voskuijl. His most popular piece was an oil on copper painting with a procession of angry women in Rome in front of Marcus Aurelius on hearing that the Roman Senate had decided in favor of polygamy for men. The story came from Macrobius. Van Mander went on to describe several portraits by him which he particularly admired, including a half-length portrait of Sara Schuyrmans playing a cittern.

Pieter Isaacsz was the subject of an exhibition at Frederiksborg Palace in 2007 as the man behind the collection's most famous portraits. He represents one of the more colourful figures of early modern art history.

== Public collections ==
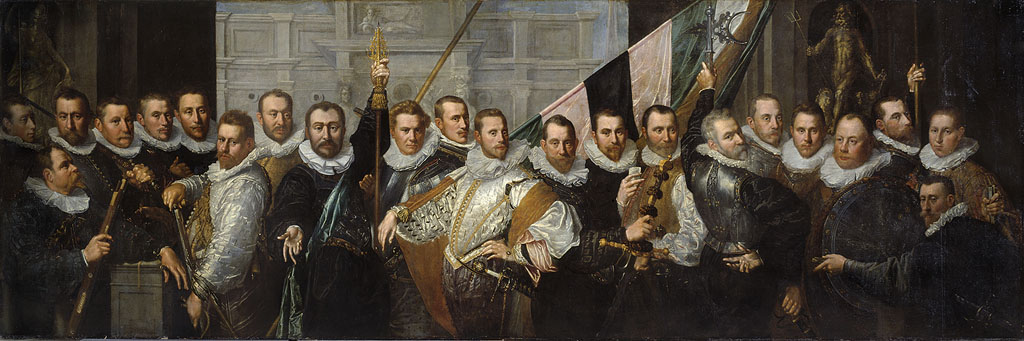
Pieter Isaacsz (1596), Civic Guardsmen from the Company of Captain Jacob Gerritsz. Hoing and Lieutenant Wybrand Appelman (Rijksmuseum)

- Rijksmuseum, Amsterdam
- Kunstmuseum Basel, Basel
- Statens Museum for Kunst, Copenhagen
- Lower Saxony State Museum, Hanover
- Frederiksborg Palace, Hillerød
- Museum of Fine Arts, Houston, Texas
