= Barend Dircksz =

Dutch Renaissance painter

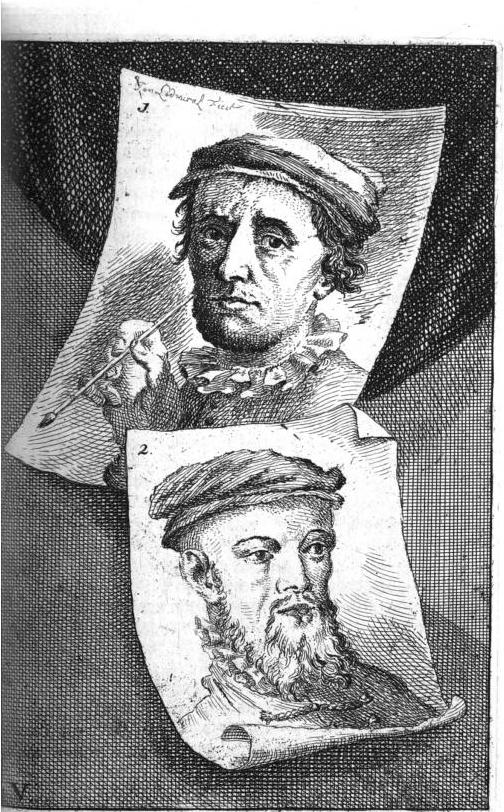
- Portrait of Doove Barend in an 18th-century illustrated version of Karel van Mander's schilder-boeck. He is shown below Allaert Claesz.
- Born: 1500
- Died: 1577 (aged 76–77)
- Children: Dirck Barendsz

Barend Dircksz or Deaf Barend (1500 – 1577) was a Dutch Renaissance painter from Amsterdam.

What little we know of him was written in passing by Karel van Mander, who included a biography of his son, Dirck Barendsz. According to Van Mander who was writing in 1604, Dirck Barendsz's father was known as dooven or deaf Barent and he painted a piece dated 1535 which was then still hanging in the Amsterdam City Hall and which depicted a mob of members of a strange sect who wished to take over the city. Van Mander wrote that this painting was somewhat unsettling to see but not badly done for his day.

== Anabaptist riot ==
The painting Van Mander referred to was a depiction of what is known today as the Anabaptist riot and was later destroyed in the fire which burned the city hall down in 1652. The Anabaptist riot of Amsterdam or Wederdopersoproer generally refers to an event on 10 May 1535 in which 40 Anabaptists occupied the city hall. The city guardsmen stormed the city hall and in the battle that ensued, the mayor Peter Colijn, 20 militiamen and 28 Anabaptists were killed. The surviving Anabaptists were executed in a particularly gruesome manner: their hearts were cut out of their breasts while still alive, their bodies were drawn and quartered, and their heads were stuck on pikes and posted at the city gates. The painting in storyboard form was probably commissioned by the Amsterdam council to both depict the dead militiamen in scenes of heroic bravery, while serving as a warning to any future insurgents.

For years the attribution of a portrait of the Amsterdam militiamen (Militiamens' meal with 8 men) was also given to Barend Dircksz.

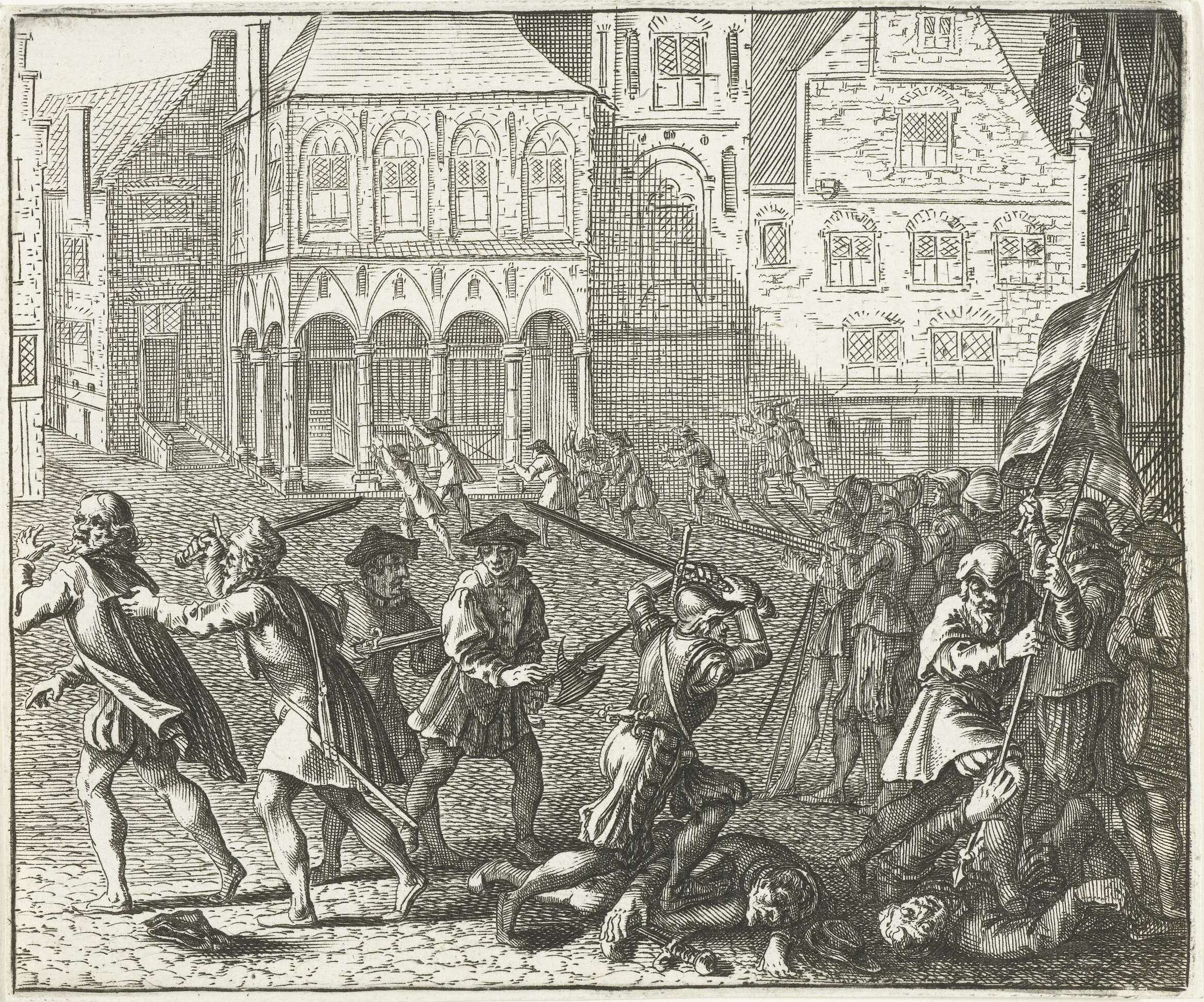
One of the many prints after the lost painting, showing events from 10 May 1535 in Amsterdam - in lower right the mayor Peter Colijn is being killed

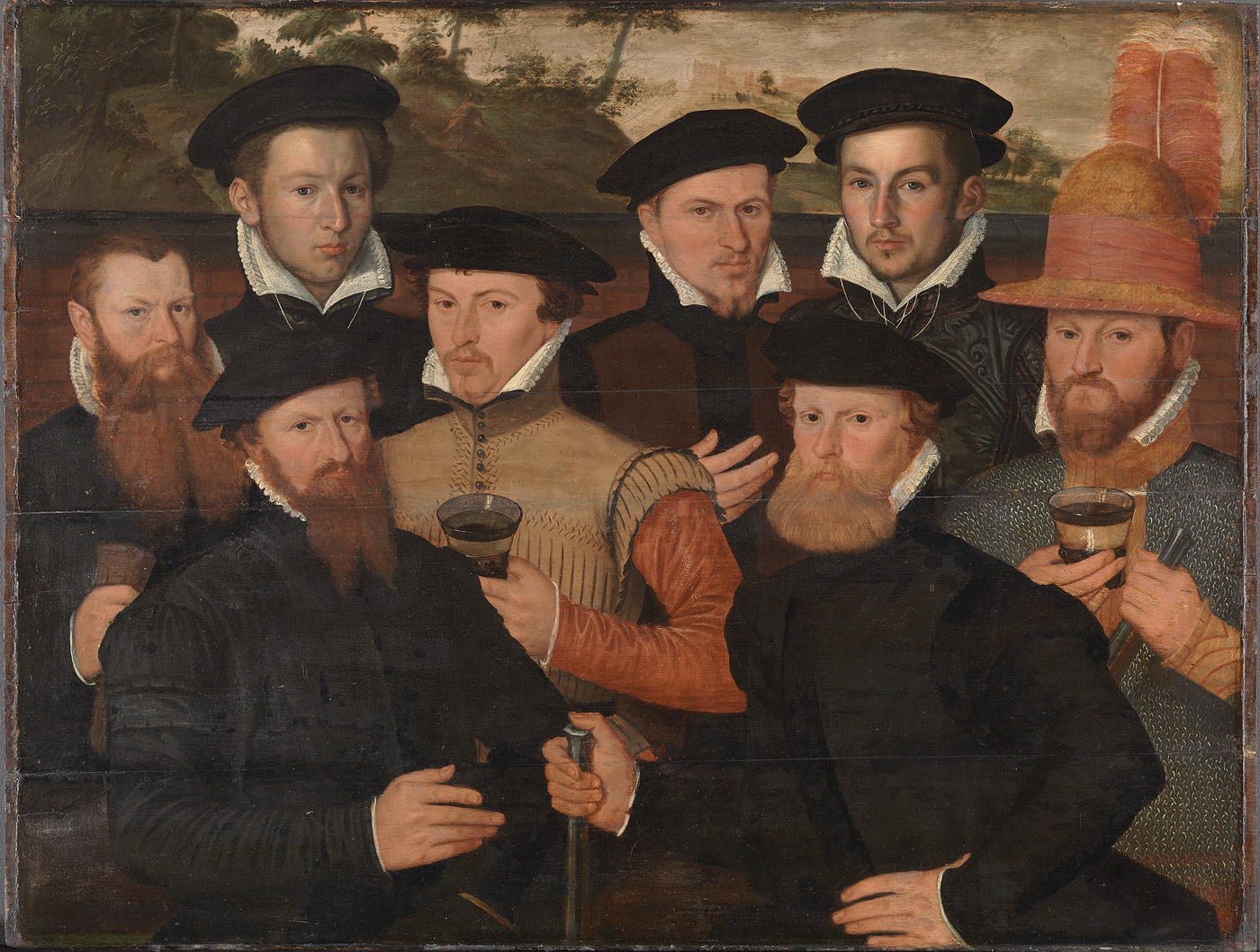
Militia piece, c. 1550
