= Anabaptist riot =

1535 riot in Amsterdam, Netherlands

Anabaptist Riot of 1535
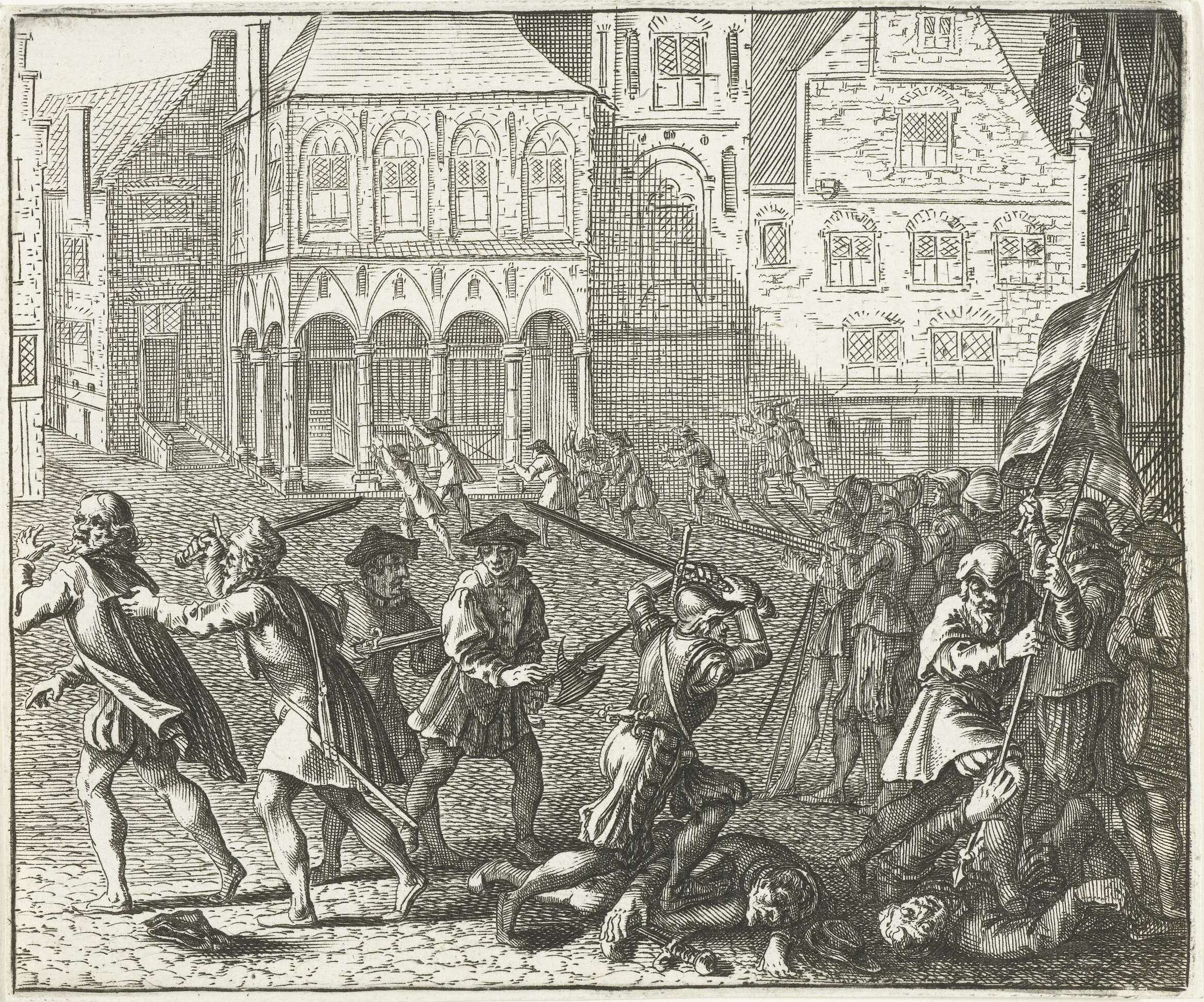
- One of the many prints after a lost painting by Barend Dircksz, showing events from 10 May 1535 in Amsterdam. In the lower right the mayor Peter Colijn is being killed.
Date	May 10, 1535
Location	Amsterdam, Habsburg Netherlands
Result	Riot suppressed

Belligerents
Amsterdam	Anabaptists

Commanders and leaders
Peter Colijn †	Unknown

Strength
Unknown	40

Casualties and losses
21 killed	28 killed Remaining executed

The Anabaptist riot of Amsterdam or Wederdopersoproer generally refers to an event on 10 May 1535 in which 40 Anabaptists occupied the city hall. The city guardsmen stormed the city hall and in the battle that ensued, the mayor Peter Colijn, 20 militiamen and 28 Anabaptists were killed. The surviving Anabaptists were executed in a particularly gruesome manner: their hearts were cut out of their chests while still alive, their bodies were drawn and quartered, and their heads were stuck on pikes and posted at the city gates. The event was commemorated in a painting by Barend Dircksz.

== Bibliography ==
- Mellink, Albert Fredrik (1978). Amsterdam en de wederdopers in de zestiende eeuw [Amsterdam and the Anabaptists in the Sixteenth Century] (in Dutch). Nijmegen: Socialistiese Uitgeverij Nijmegen. ISBN 9061681200. OCLC 643668924 – via Internet Archive.
