= Gouda triptych of the Life of Mary =

Painting by Dirck Barendsz

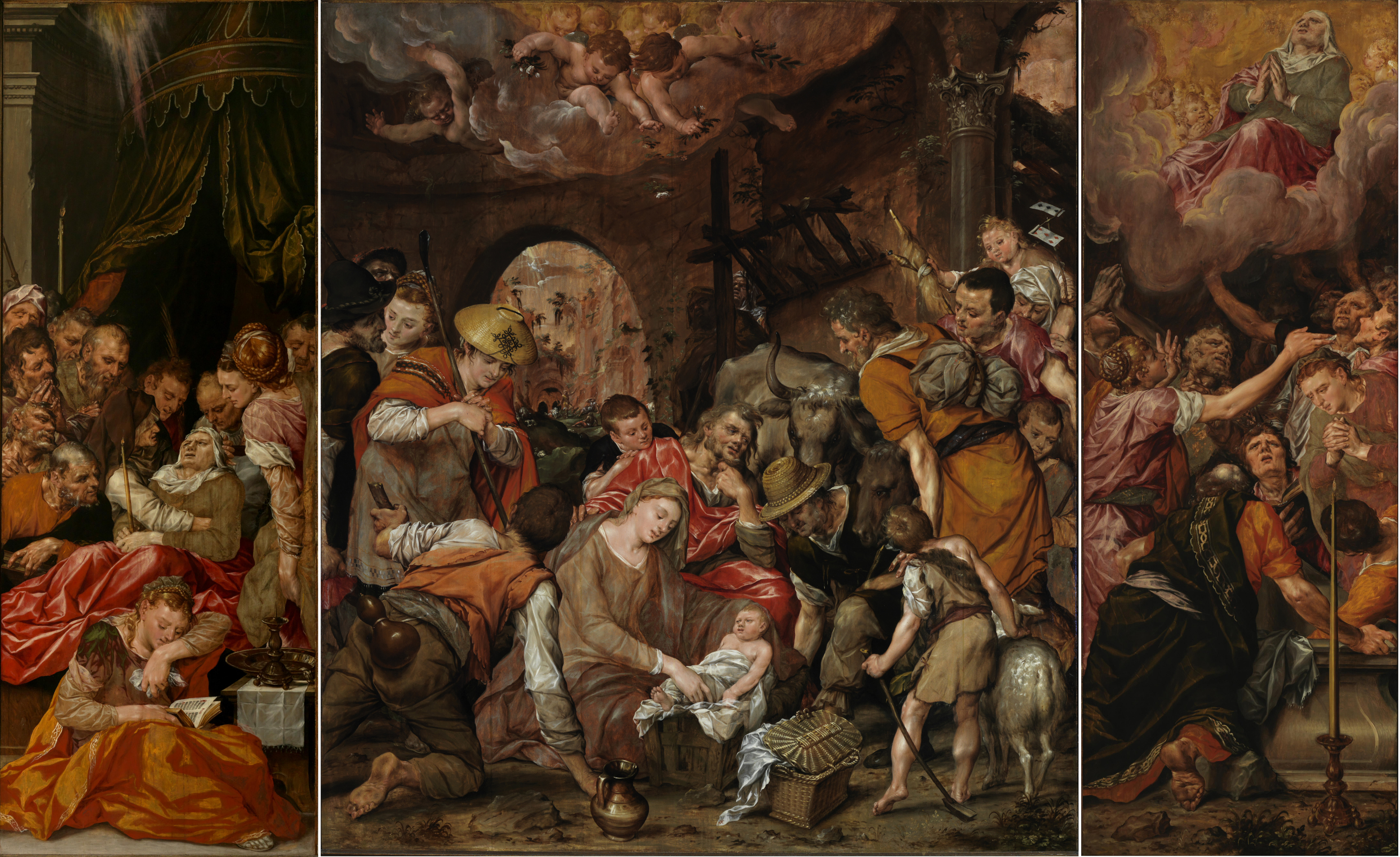
- Artist: Dirck Barendsz
- Year: circa 1565
- Medium: Oil on panel
- Dimensions: 277 cm × 370 cm (109 in × 150 in)
- Location: Museum Gouda, Gouda

Triptych with Scenes of the Life of the Virgin is an oil on panel triptych by the painter Dirck Barendsz dated to around 1565 in the collection of the Museum Gouda. It is an unusual survivor of the 16th-century iconoclast fury known as the Beeldenstorm which remained in Gouda. The painting has been well documented over the centuries. It is executed in the freer Venetian style of Italian painting rather than the Mannerism more common among Barendsz' contemporaries.

== Description ==
The central panel depicts the Adoration of the shepherds. Mary kneels before the Child Jesus, who lies in a crib supported by her left hand in her cloak. With her right hand she reaches for the child's left foot. In front of the crib is a basket of linen. Behind her is Joseph with the ox and donkey, and he is looking at the shepherds who have come to view the baby. A group of angels hover above the scene and appear to be wrestling with clouds to lean forward towards the holy infant.

The triptych is flanked on the left by a panel with a scene of the Dormition of the Mother of God and on the right by a panel of the Assumption of Mary. The closed shutters show the Annunciation.

== History ==
The painting was mentioned by Karel van Mander in his Schilder-boeck as one of the artist's best works. By that time in 1604 the turmoil of the Reformation had passed and this triptych was once again on view, but no longer in the Sint Janskerk for which it had been commissioned, as that church became Protestant after 1566. It was on show at that time in the "Fraters huys", or Fraterhouse of the Brethren of the Common Life. According to the art historian J.R. Judson, it is unclear who commissioned the work and it was possibly commissioned by the Fraterhouse for the Sint Janskerk, as their own chapel was too small for the size of this altar. Whoever commissioned it, they must have been a promoter of literacy (though Barendsz was known as an erudite letter writer and musician himself) as it features not one, but two women reading:

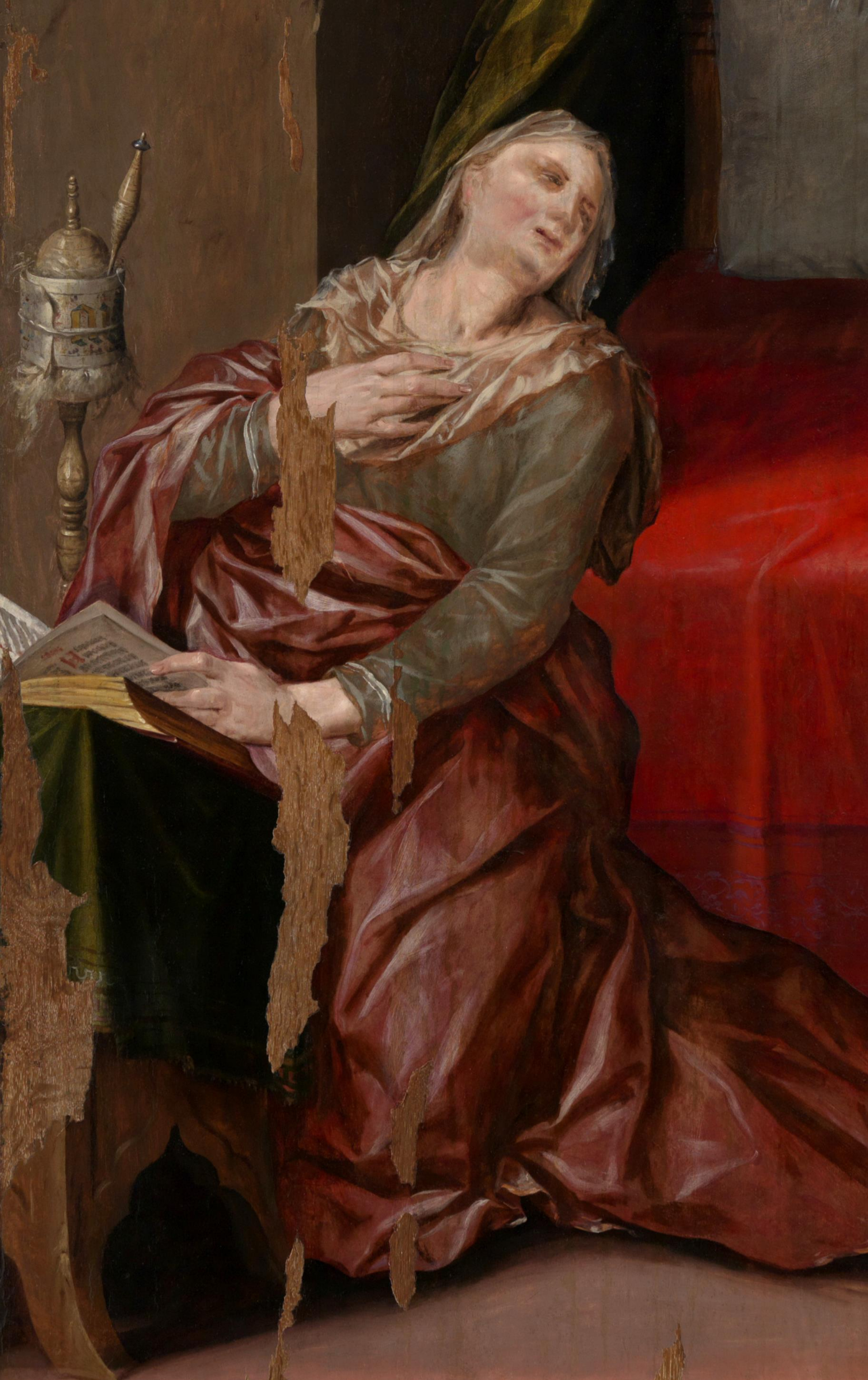
outer door

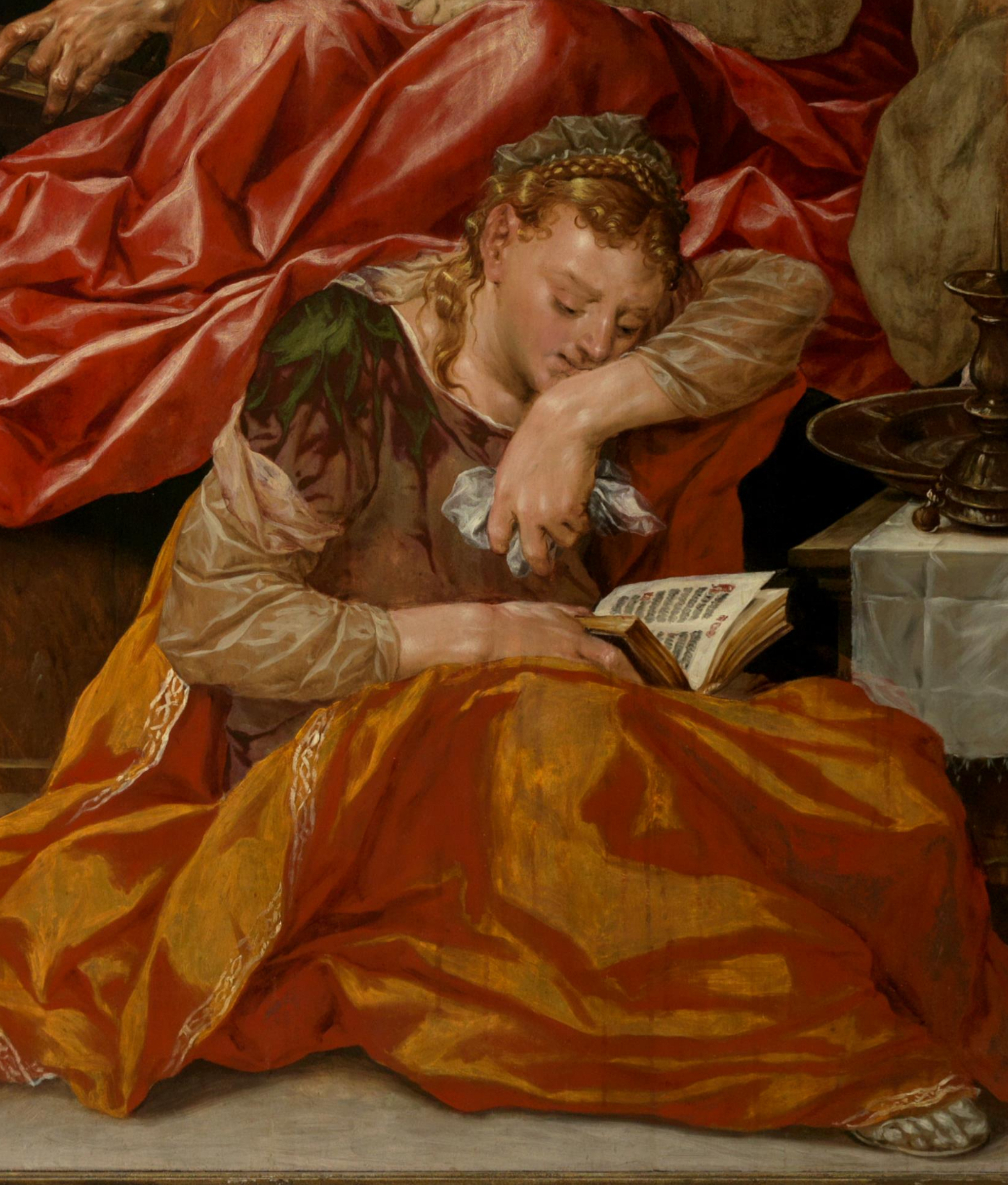
inner door

Unlike other cities in the Netherlands, the religious works considered too Catholic during the iconoclasm had been kept back by the city of Gouda and not sold off, and thus this one could be saved as part of Gouda's cultural heritage. In his work on the Schilderboeck, the art historian Hessel Miedema noticed that some cities seemed to fare better than others, and remarked that perhaps less was destroyed than had been sold. Alert city custodians were able to retrieve some works or find them in sales catalogs because they had had engravings made, drawings made, or visitors had described them minutely in other works beforehand. The Sint Janskerk had had an extra and somewhat dubious advantage in that the great church had been closed for renovations during the 1550s and 1560s due to a disastrous fire that occurred on January 12, 1552. So though commissioned for the great church, it is possible that it had not been seen there publicly before the troubles began the year after it was completed.

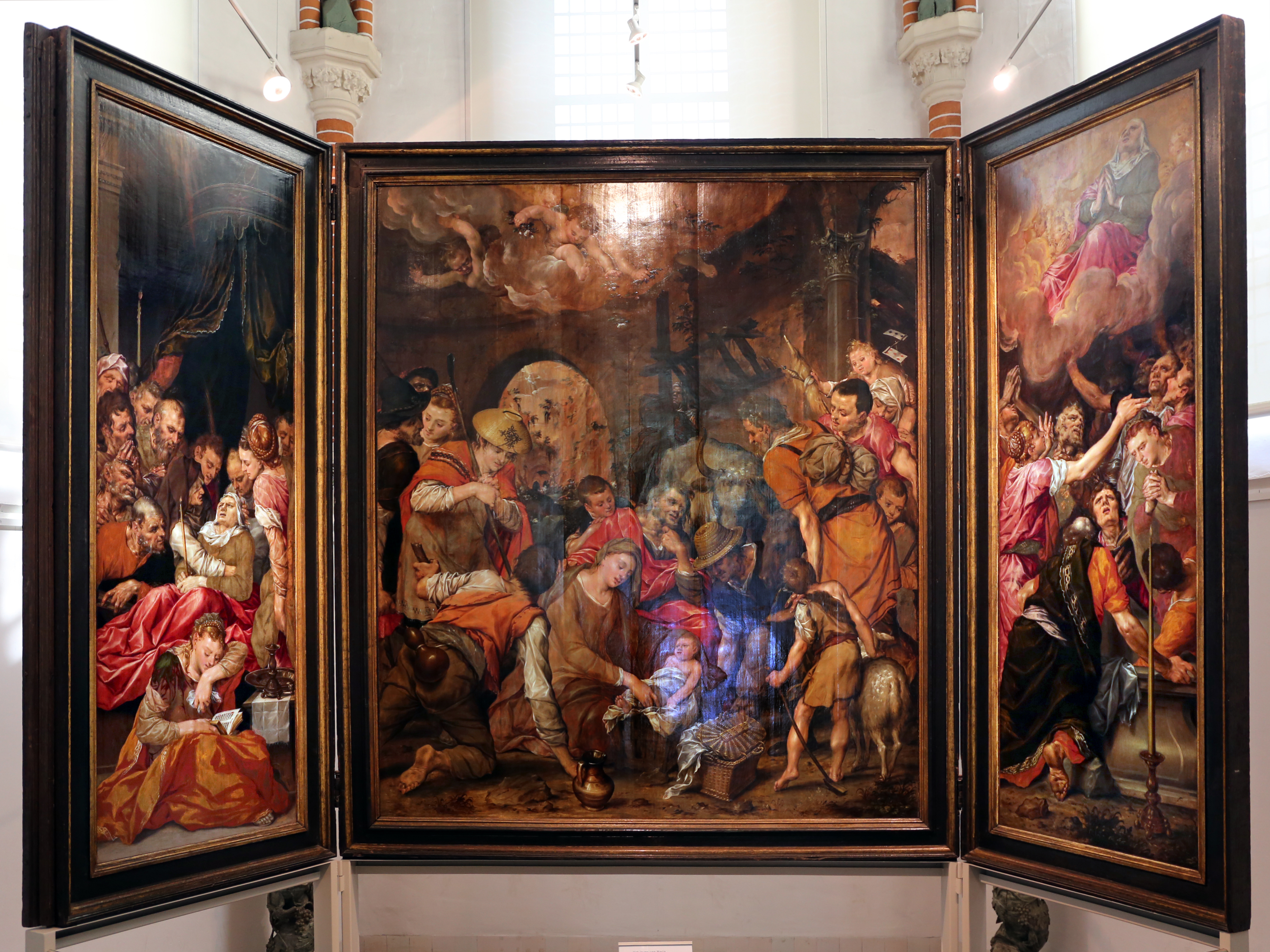
The triptych in the museum today

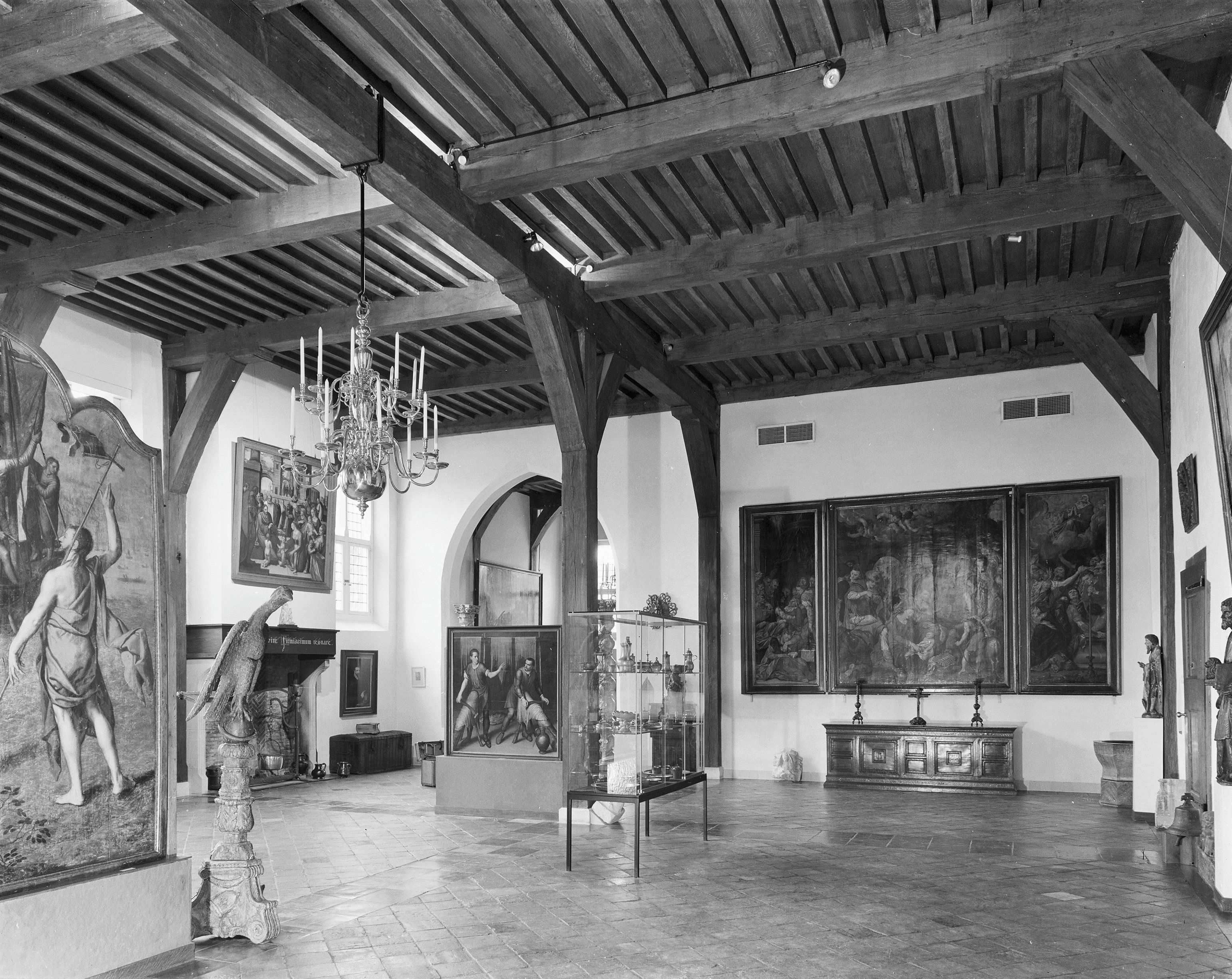
The triptych as it was shown in 1970

The side panels:

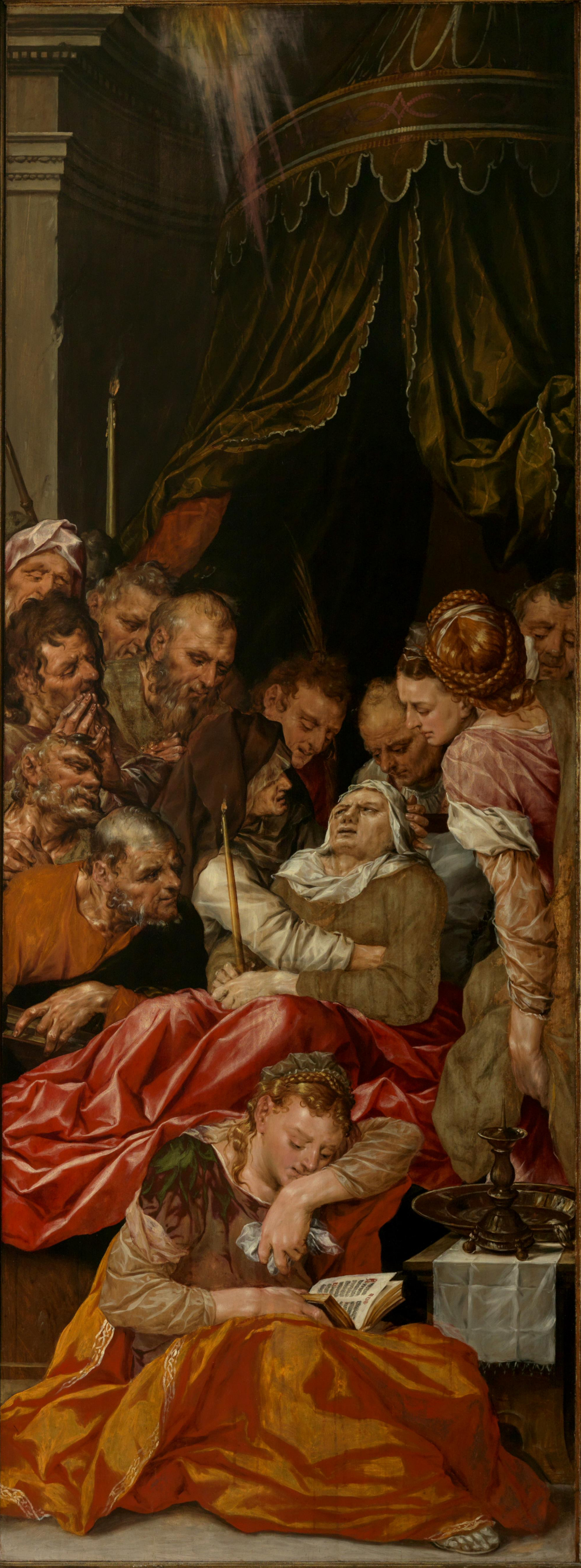
The Dormition

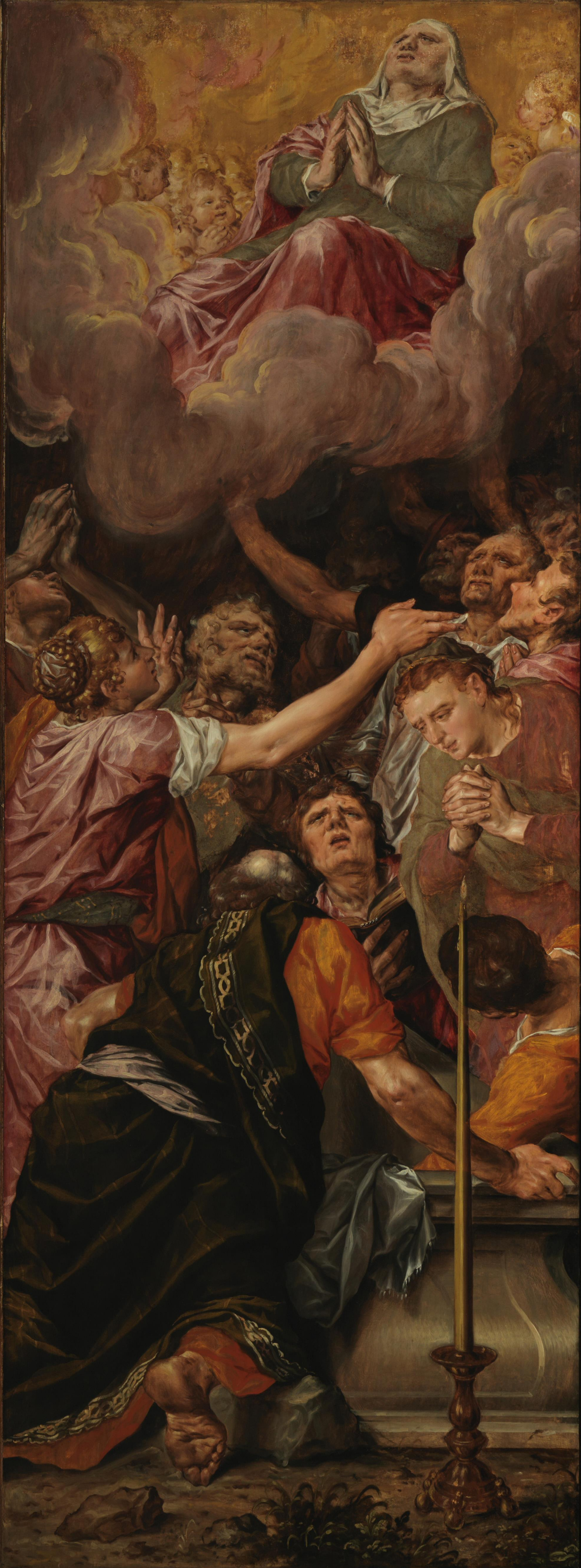
The Assumption

The scene of the Annunciation when the shutters are closed:

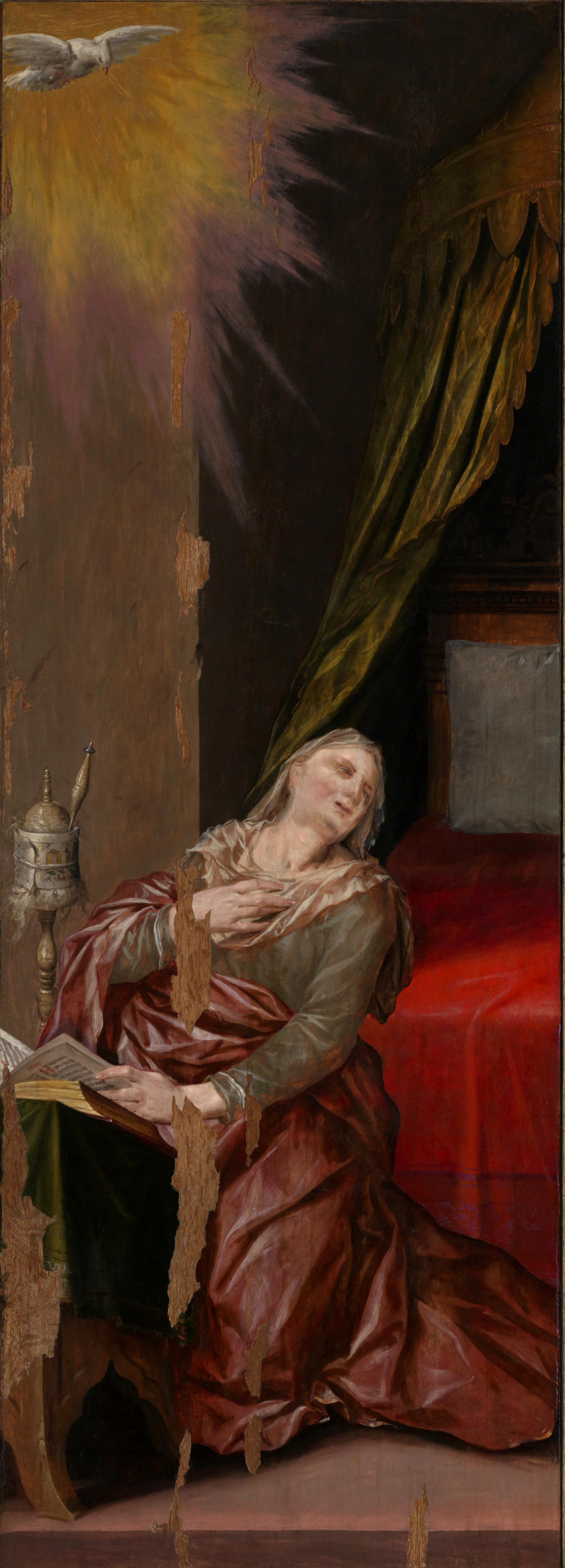
left shutter

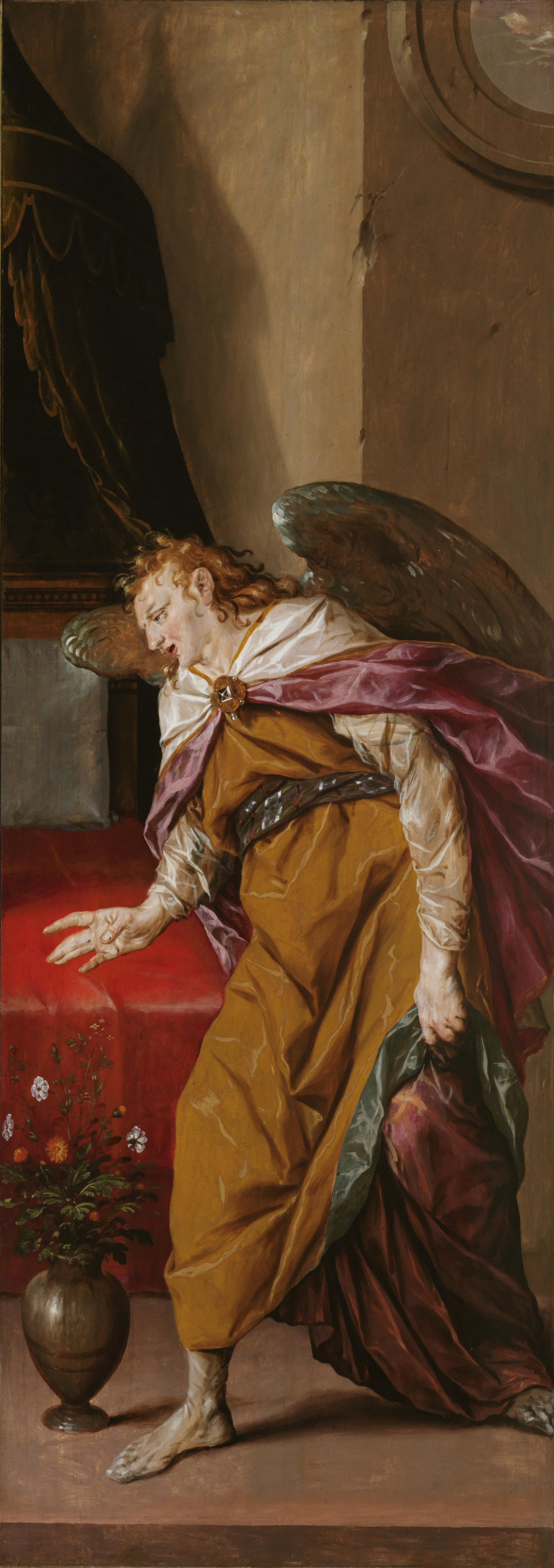
right shutter
