= Peter Colijn =

Dutch statesman

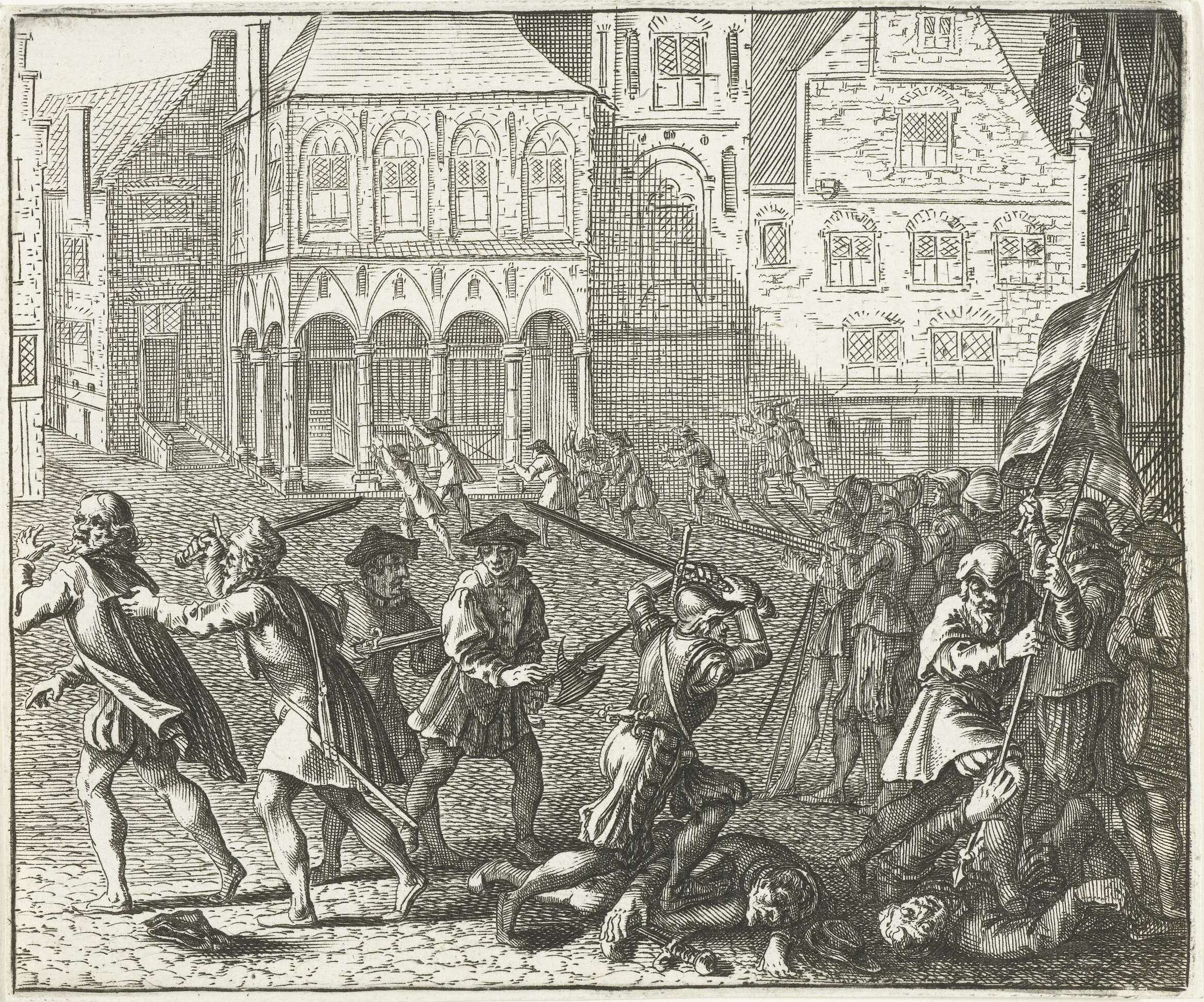
One of the many prints after a lost painting by Barend Dircksz, showing events from 10 May 1535 in Amsterdam. In the lower right the mayor Peter Colijn is being killed

Peter Colijn (d. 10 May 1535 in Amsterdam) [alt. sp. Pieter Colÿn] was a Dutch statesman, and the burgomeister (mayor) of Amsterdam from 1532 until his death. Colijn was murdered during the Anabaptist riot of Amsterdam known as the Wederdopersoproer (similar to the Münster Rebellion). Colijn’s death occurred when radical members within the religious group known as Anabaptists attempted to seize control of the government of Amsterdam. He was said to have sympathized with them.
