= Dirck Barendsz =

Painter from the Northern Netherlands

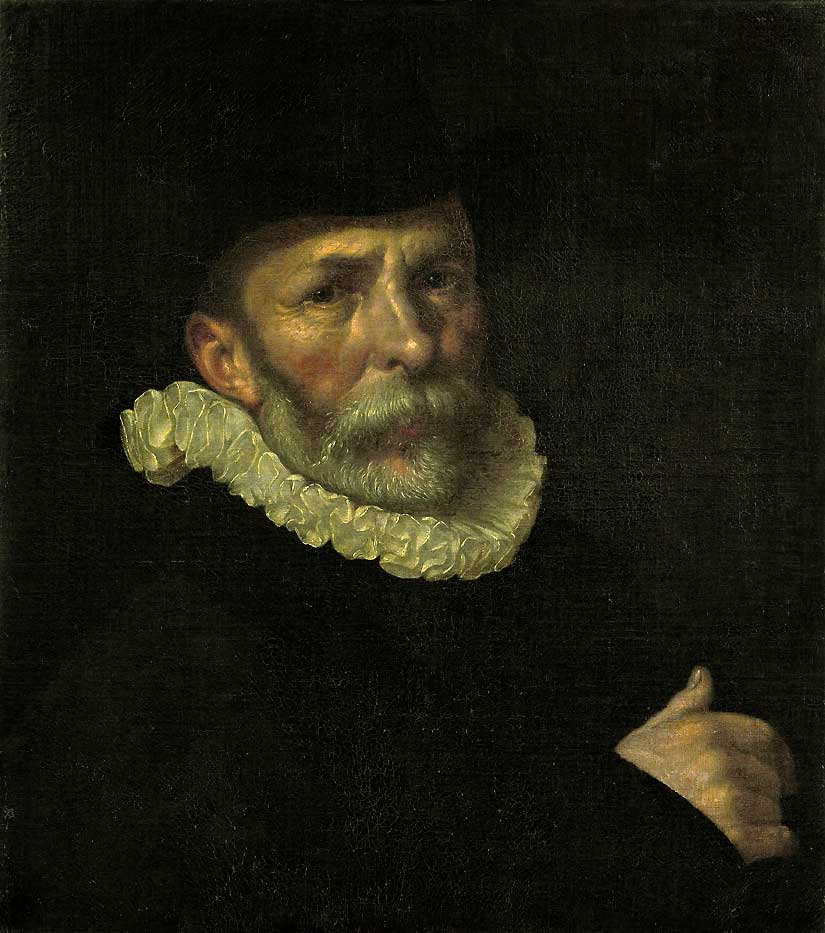
- Portrait of Dirck Barendsz by Cornelis Ketel
- Born: 1534; Amsterdam, Holland, Spain
- Died: 1592 (aged 57–58); Amsterdam, Holland, The Netherlands
- Parent: Barend Dircksz

Dirck Barendsz or Theodor Barendszoon (1534–1592) was a Dutch Renaissance painter from Amsterdam who traveled to Italy in his youth to learn from the Italian masters, most notably Titian.

== Biography ==
He was trained by his father, a painter known as Barend Dircksz, or deaf Barent, and in 1555, at the age of twenty-one, Barendsz travelled to Italy. During his seven-year stay there, Karel van Mander tells us that he was "nursed at the great Titian's bosem."

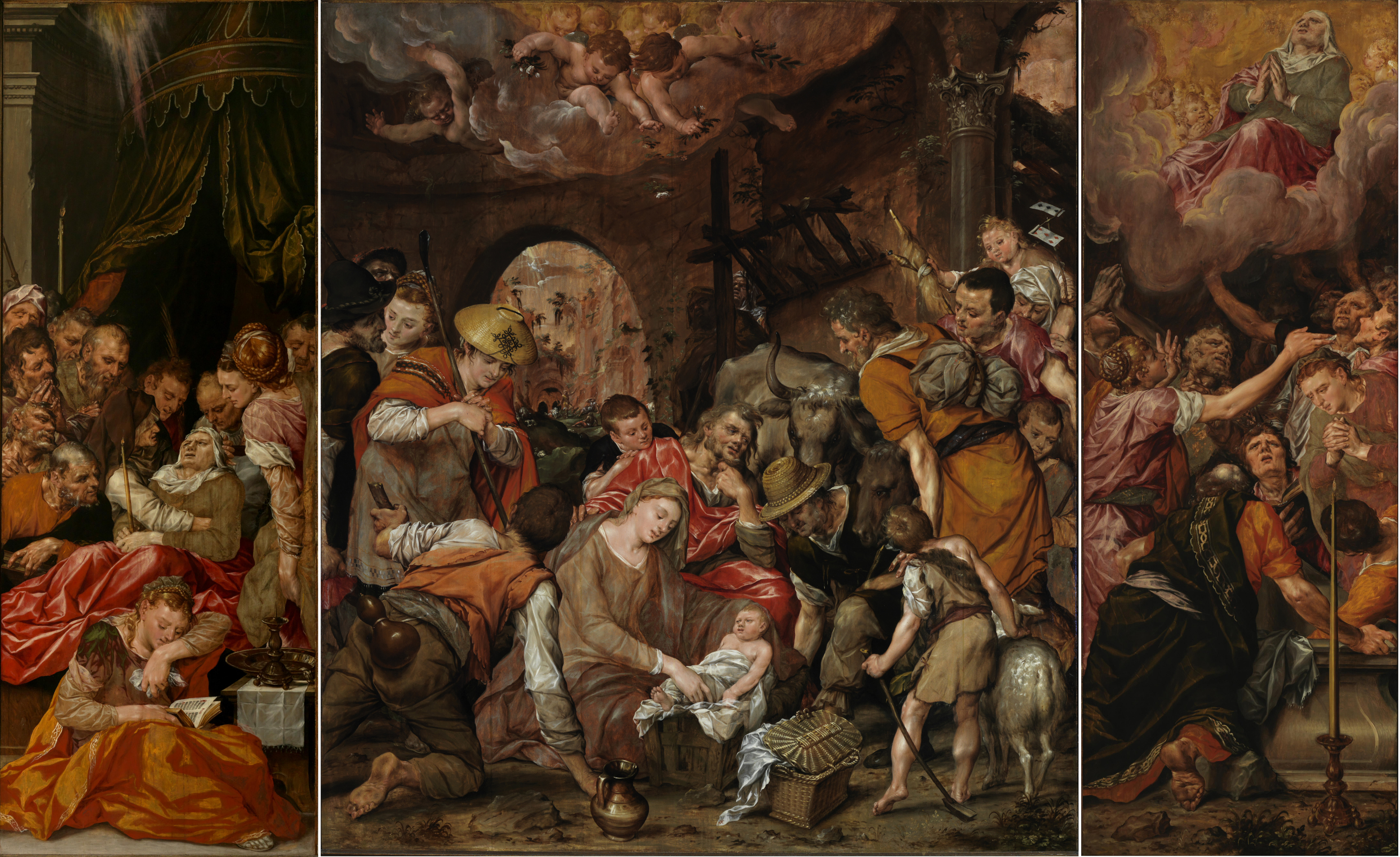
Gouda triptych of the Life of Mary - Museum Gouda, c. 1565

He was a great friend of Philip Van Marnix, whom he met in Rome, and Dominicus Lampsonius, with whom he corresponded in Latin. He was a good musician and his most notable work, among various other pieces Van Mander describes that he painted in Amsterdam, was a Judith. Among pieces worthy of mention in Leiden that Van Mander liked was a Venus that at the time he was writing in 1604 was in the possession of Sybrandt Buyck (son of the last Catholic mayor of Amsterdam, Joost Sijbrantsz Buyck). Van Mander further lists several Tafels (altarpieces), including a "Christmas piece" in the possession of the Fraterhouse in Gouda, and a copy of a tronie by Titian, in the possession of Pieter Isaacsz (1569–1625), an Amsterdam painter and art dealer. The "Christmas piece" is still in Gouda and is the only complete surviving altarpiece by him.

His chapel piece for the Amsterdam militia, called a Fall of Lucifer by Mander, was destroyed in the Beeldenstorm, but his militia portrait for the same group that hung in their meeting hall survived. He died in Amsterdam.

== Gallery ==
Selected works

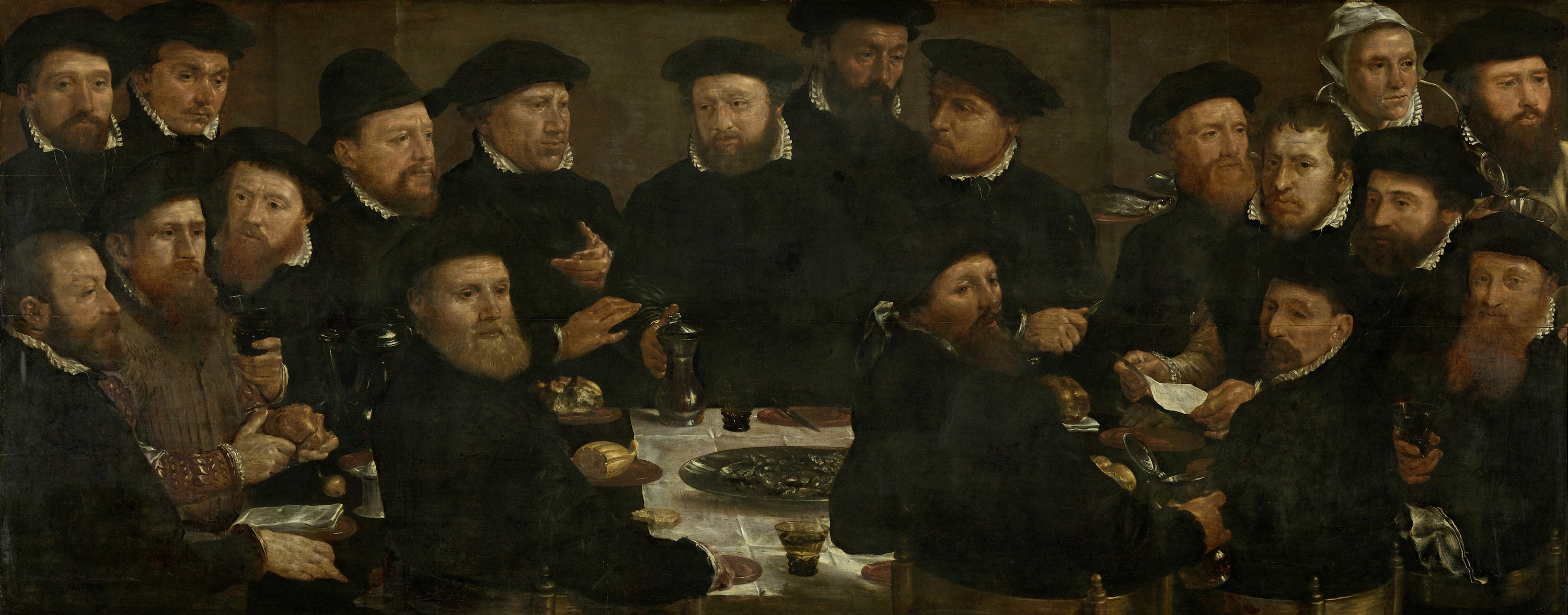
Meal of the Amsterdam guardsmen in 1566, known as the Poseters

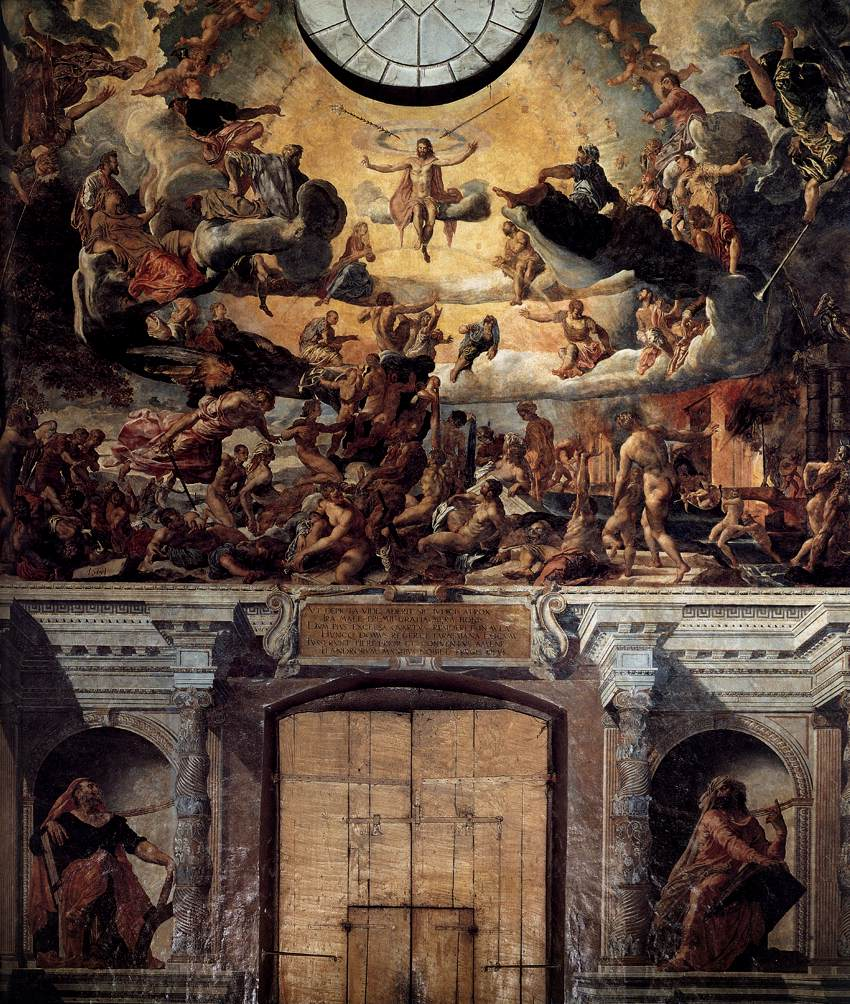
The Last Judgment, Benedictine Abbey, Fara in Sabina, 1561

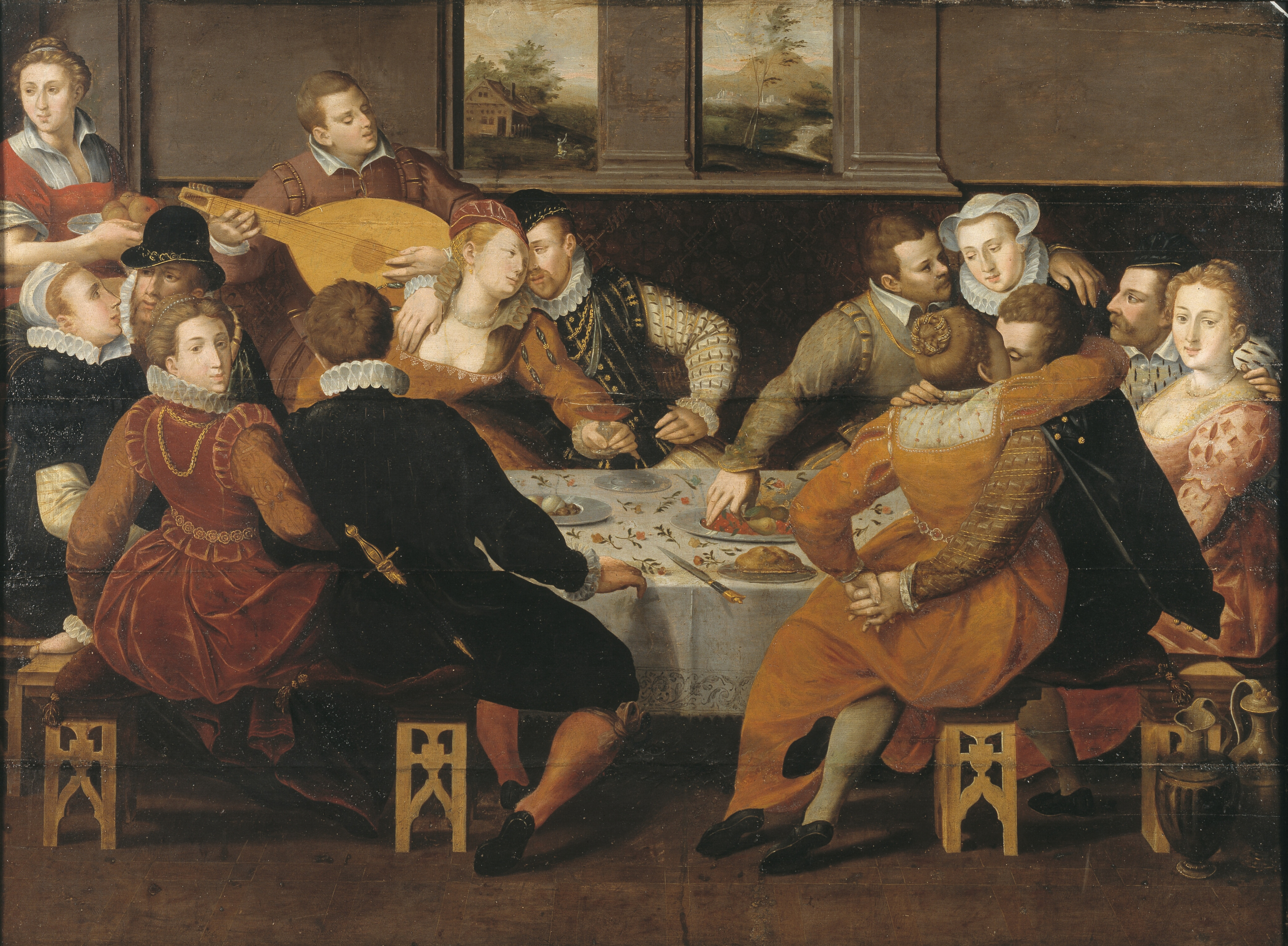
Sinful Mankind Surprised by the Day of Judgment, National Gallery of Denmark
