= Slot Assumburg =

Castle in Heemskerk, Netherlands

Assumburg Castle
- Slot Assumburg
- Heemskerk, the Netherlands
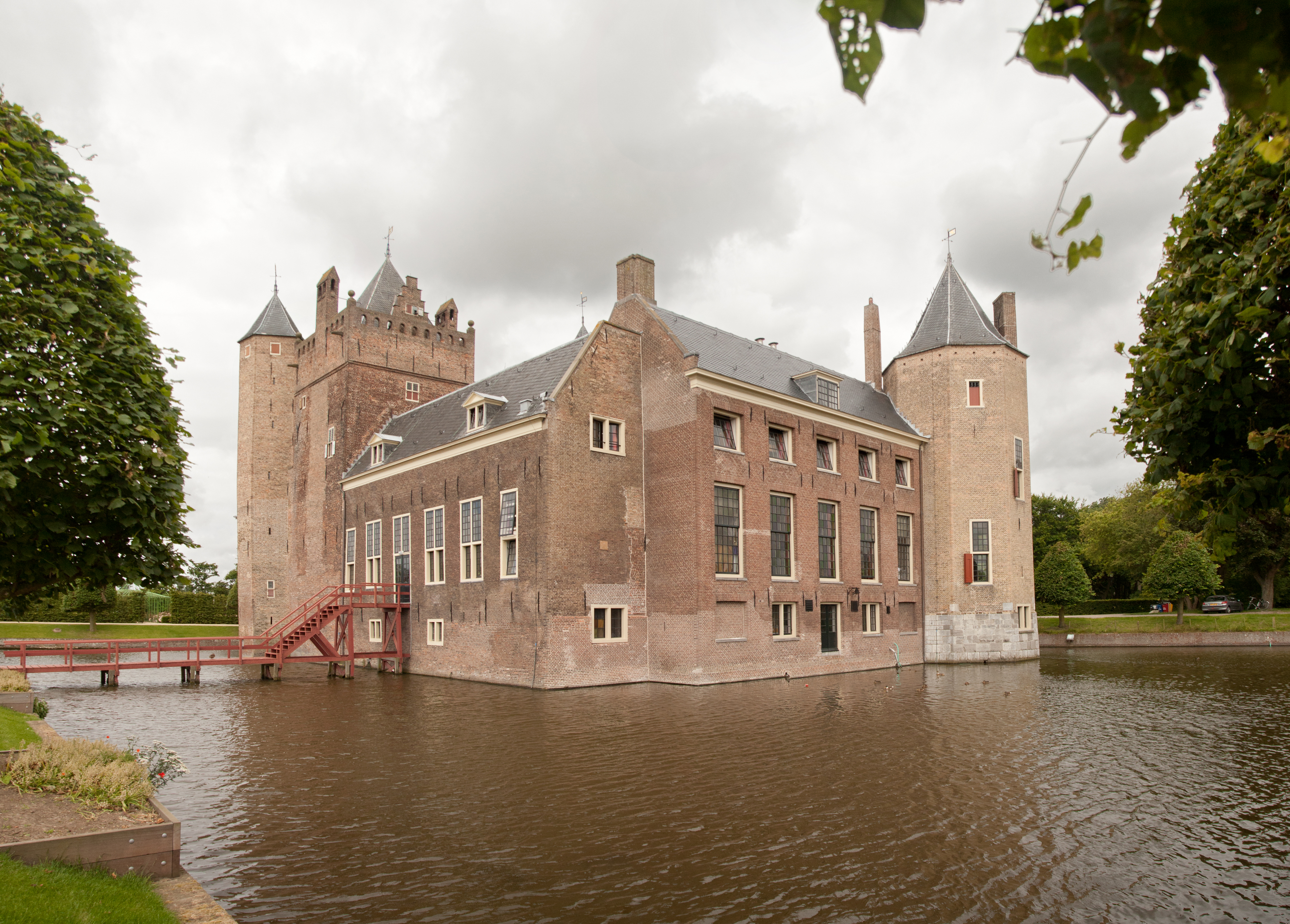
- Assumburg Castle in 2012

Site information
- Type: Castle

Location
- North Holland
- Coordinates: 52.505306°N 4.684922°E

Site history
- Built: c. 1450

Slot Assumburg is a castle in the east of Heemskerk in the province of North Holland in the Netherlands.

== Castle Characteristics ==
=== Predecessor ===
The current castle dates from 1450. However, the many finds of Kloostermoppen (large medieval bricks), and pottery from earlier times made it quite certain that the current castle had a predecessor. In 2021 this was discovered by geophysical survey with Electromagnetic (EM) conductivity technique.

Just north of the current castle, there was a round castle bailey of 12 m diameter, surrounded by a moat. On it was a round brick tower of 9.5 m diameter. Historical records refer to a house with moat and a flattened hill. Between 1399 and 1446 this hill (motte) was leveled and replaced by an orchard.

=== The current castle ===
It probably dates originally from the 13th century, but was renovated in 1546 and is named after the hamlet of Assum between Heemskerk and Uitgeest. It is assumed that demolition material from Oud Haerlem Castle was used in the construction, but that is not the case. The power that the castle radiates is also more apparent than reality. In fact it is an imitation of a medieval castle. The thin walls would not have withstood a siege. Such a castle is usually called a wings castle.

Assumburg Castle has been a noble residence for many centuries. After 1867 the castle remained uninhabited. The paneling and utensils were transferred to Marquette Castle. The environment also lost its former glory: the park around the castle disappeared. From 1911 until January 15, 2016, it was owned by the government. The castle was handed over to the state for one guilder with the obligation to restore the castle. The restoration commissioned by the Government Buildings Agency was finally completed around 1980. The nearby orangery had already been restored around 1965. In 1933 the Assumburg got its destination as a youth hostel.

With the exception of limited opening during Heritage Days, the castle itself is not open to the public. Next to the castle is the Assumburg nature and recreation park, which was created in 2003. From 2009, the 18th-century castle garden was restored to its original state and opened to the public in 2011. The castle garden includes a fruit orchard, a rose garden, a vegetable and herb garden and a large formal area with a courtyard pond.

This monument was transferred to the National Monuments Organization on January 15, 2016.

== History ==
=== Family van Velsen ===
The castle was known in the 13th and 14th centuries as Williaems Woninghe van Velsen and, as the name suggests, it was inhabited by the van Velsen family. Jan van Rietwijk, son of Willem van Rietwijk van Velsen, was mortgaged in 1322 with half of the Assumburg. The other half already belonged to Barthout van Assendelft, who must therefore have been a relative of Jan van Rietwijk. On May 17, 1328, Jan sold his half of the Assumburg to Barthoud van Assendelft. Afterwards Barthoud (I) dedicated the entire Assumburg to Mr. Jan I van Polanen (owner of the Oud Haerlem castle ), who lent him it on June 5, 1335. Barthoud was married to Catharina, daughter of Dirk van den Wale, steward of Count Willem III. Dirk van den Wale was a bastard of Polanen! Barthoud probably died in 1345. His eldest son Dirk (I) obtained the Assumburg, but died childless shortly afterwards, so that his younger brother Gerrit (II) could settle in this castle in 1348. This Gerrit had remained in relationship with the family of his old lords, the Van Haerlem's: he married Stevina van Haarlem. Since then, the Van Assendelft's have included the Van Haerlem's coat of arms in theirs.

=== Family van Assendelft ===
Their eldest son Barthoud (II) was exiled by Duke William VI. So brother Dirk (II) van Assendelft moved into the Assumburg in 1413 and was even lend (April 20, 1421). The last male Van Assendelft to inhabit the Assumburg was Gerrit (VIII) (1567-1617), lord of Assendelft (1601), Assumburg, etc. Gerrit (VIII) remained unmarried. After his death his sister Anna (II) received the Assumburg in fief (1618). She was married to Gerrit van Renesse van der Aa. Anna died in 1626. Renesses continued to live on the Assumburg for several decades, but in 1669 merchant Johannes Wuijtiers bought the castle.

=== Deutz family ===
When, after several owners, Jean Deutz had bought the castle in 1694, he had the Assumburg embellished according to the taste of that time: a French garden with water features and public gardens. The last Deutz was Jacob Maarten Deutz van Assendelft who lived at the castle and also died there (in 1858 ). When his wife Josina Johanna Willink died in Amsterdam in 1867, that was also the end of the Assumburg as a considerable country retreat. An auction of the furniture took place for fourteen days (October 1868 ). Land holdings were also sold. After having been rented to the Hague city councilor Hugh Hope Loudon for a year(1816-1891), the building was given various functions: in 1881 as a hospital during a cholera epidemic and later as a school. In 1906 Hugo Gevers van Marquette had the paneling of the main hall transferred to Marquette Castle. The marble chimneys and four doors with their frames were also brought there.

== Restoration ==
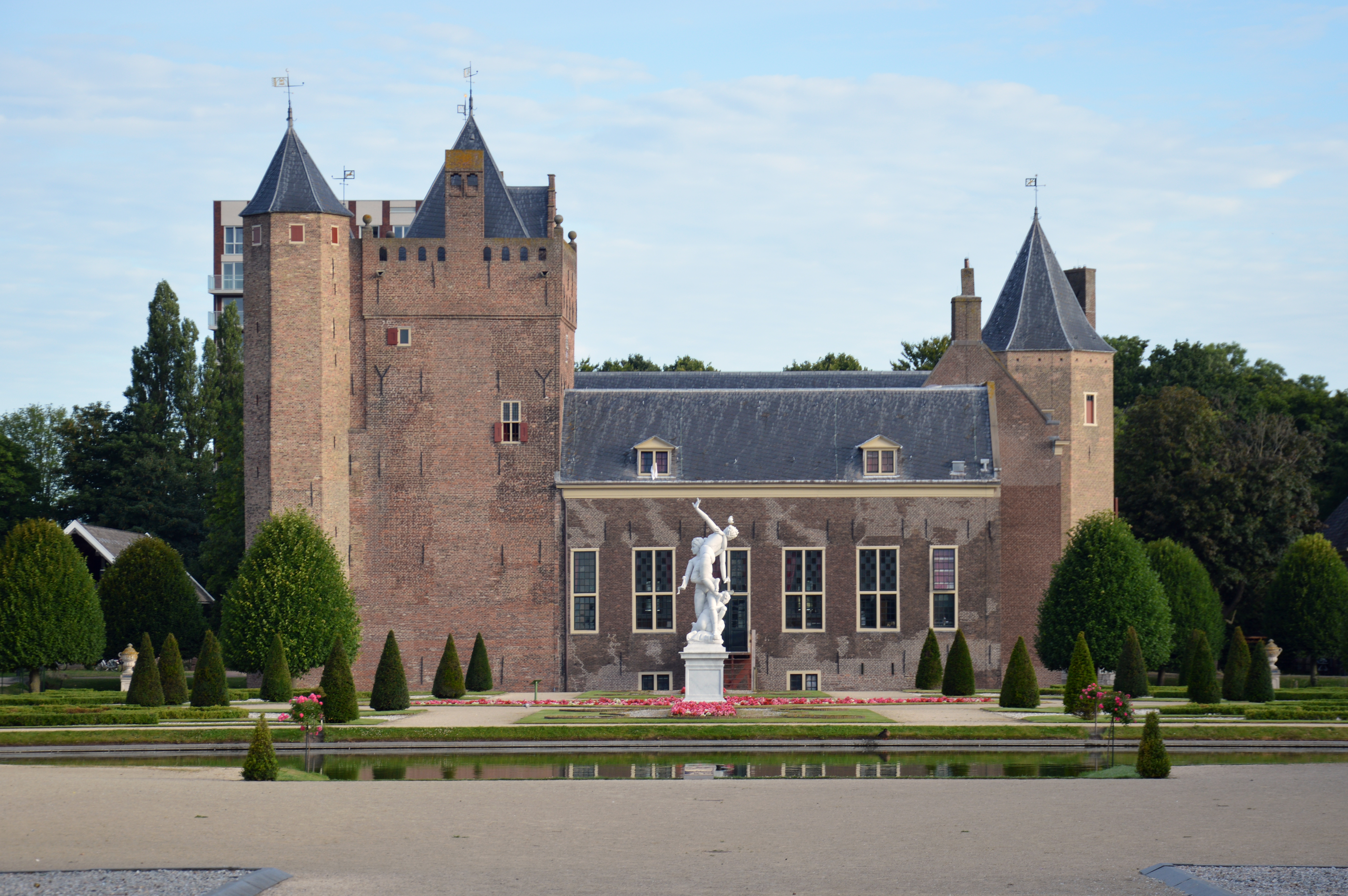
Garden view of Slot Assumburg in 2022.

The almost ruined castle was sold to the state on September 18, 1911. It was decided to renovate the building. A destination as a youth hostel ensured the social usefulness of the old castle. On July 15, 1933, the first young people found shelter here, unemployed youth hostel friends did a lot of work as part of the restoration. During the Second World War the Germans camped in the castle. After the liberation it served for some time as a prison for some thirty political prisoners.

In 2015, a visitors center for the castle was extended.

Its walls were repaired in 2020.
