= Het Brein Dat Kwam Uit De Ruimte =

Dutch band

- Origin: Heemskerk, Netherlands
- Genres: Electronic music, experimental music
- Years active: 2006–2016
- Members: Jeroen Besseling; Steven van Egmond; Jasper Everaerd

Het Brein Dat Kwam Uit De Ruimte ("The brain that came from space") is an experimental electronic Dutch band from Heemskerk.

== Biography ==
Active since 2006, Het Brein won the IJmond Popprijs, a band competition, in 2007. In 2008, they also participated in the IJmond competition, and again in 2009, when they made the finals. As the 2007 winners of the Popmania competition, they were given the closing slot at the annual Popmania festival in Heerhugowaard.

In 2009, they played twice at Beeckestijn Pop, a festival in Velsen attended by 15,000. Their regular session was a "smashing" show, and they added an all-acoustic session which was filmed by VPRO's 3VOOR12.

== Discography ==
=== De Invasie is Begonnen (2008) ===
Debut album, independently released.

=== De Zesde Dimensie (2009) ===
De Zesde Dimensie

Studio album by Het Brein Dat Kwam Uit De Ruimte
- Released: 2009
- Genre: Electronic music, experimental music

Album was recorded at Big River Studio in Dirkshorn, engineered by Mark Leendertse.

==== Track list ====
1. Urban
2. De Zesde Dimensie
3. Allenpiraat
4. Volg De Orders

== Line-up ==
- Jeroen Besseling – drums, vocals
- Jasper "Spook" Everaerd – keyboards, vocoder, vocals
- Steven van Egmond – guitar, bass, vocals
