= Jacob van Moscher =

Dutch Golden Age landscape painter

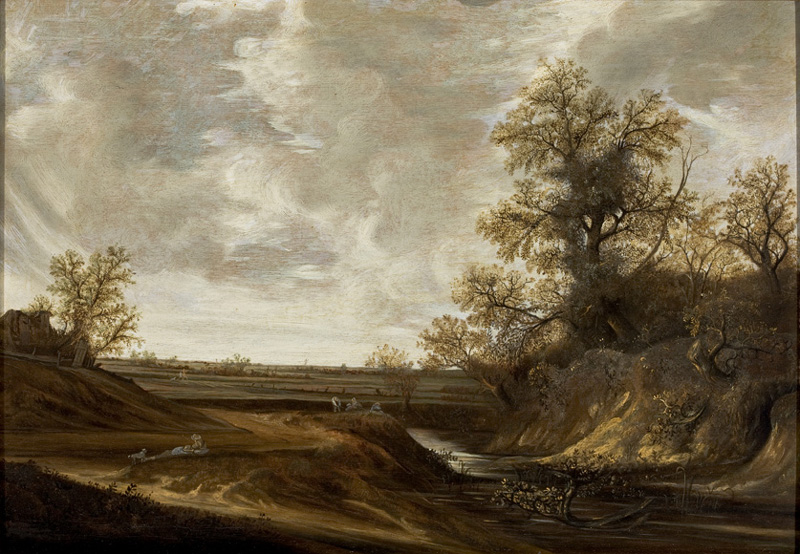
A view of Kennemerland

Jacob van Mosscher (c. 1600 – c. 1660), was a Dutch Golden Age landscape painter.

According to the RKD he is often confused with Jacob van Musscher, a pupil of Karel van Mander and the grandfather of Michiel van Musscher. He was a landscape painter who worked in Haarlem during the years 1635-1645.
