= Assum =

- Hamlet
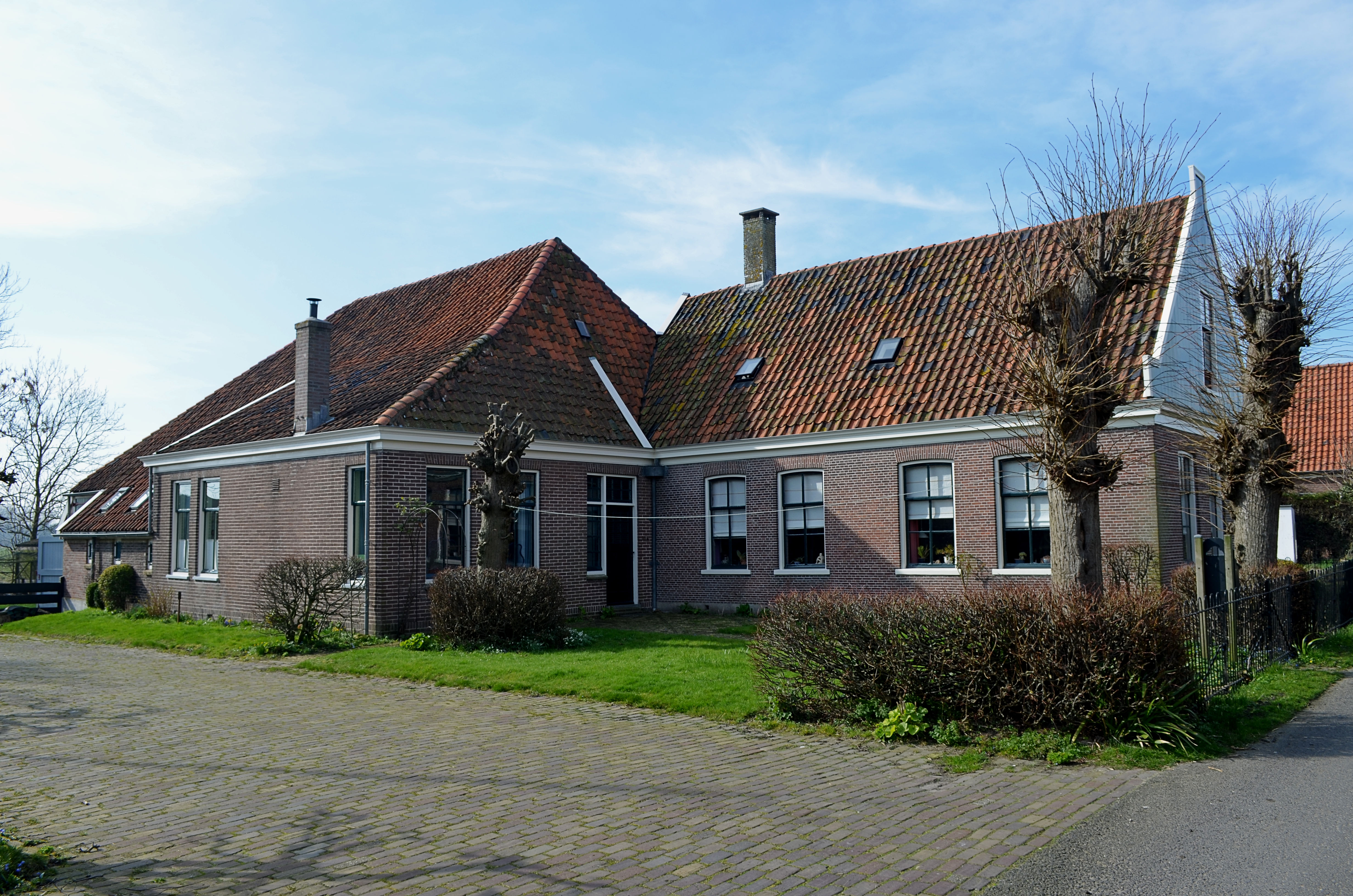
- Farmhouse in Assum

- Location in the Netherlands Location in the province of North Holland in the Netherlands
- Coordinates: 52°31′N 4°42′E
- Country: Netherlands
- Province: North Holland
- Municipality: Uitgeest
- Elevation: 0.3 m (0.98 ft)

Population (2020)
  - Total: c. 175
- Time zone: UTC+1 (CET)
  - Summer (DST): UTC+2 (CEST)
- Postcode: 1911
- Area code: 0251

Assum is a hamlet in the municipality of Uitgeest in the province of North Holland in the Netherlands. The hamlet of Assum was originally an independent village but has now been absorbed by the larger Uitgeest. Assum is located between Uitgeest and Heemskerk. Due to this original independence, this place name can still be found in place name registers and, for example, the telephone directory on the internet.

Assum consists of approximately 70 homes, including a number of agricultural farm homes. Until about 1990, Assum was situated in an agricultural area. Due to the growth of Uitgeest with the Kleis and Waldijk districts, the buildings of Uitgeest are approaching the hamlet of Assum.

The nearby Slot Assumburg is named after the hamlet.

== Etymology ==
Assum was mentioned in 1397 as Assem. It is probably composed of ask, "ash tree", or the personal name Ascman, and heem, "place of residence".

== Gallery ==
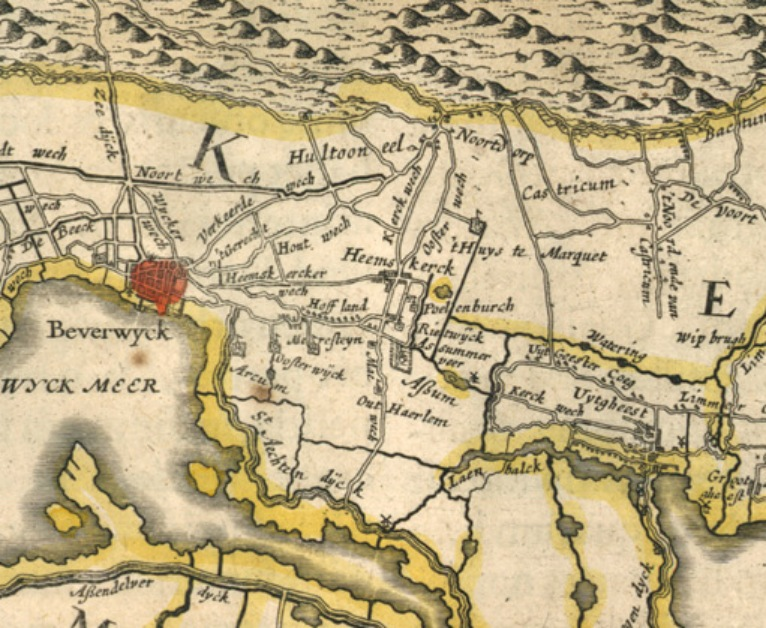
Aẞum on a 1645 map of Joan Blaeu

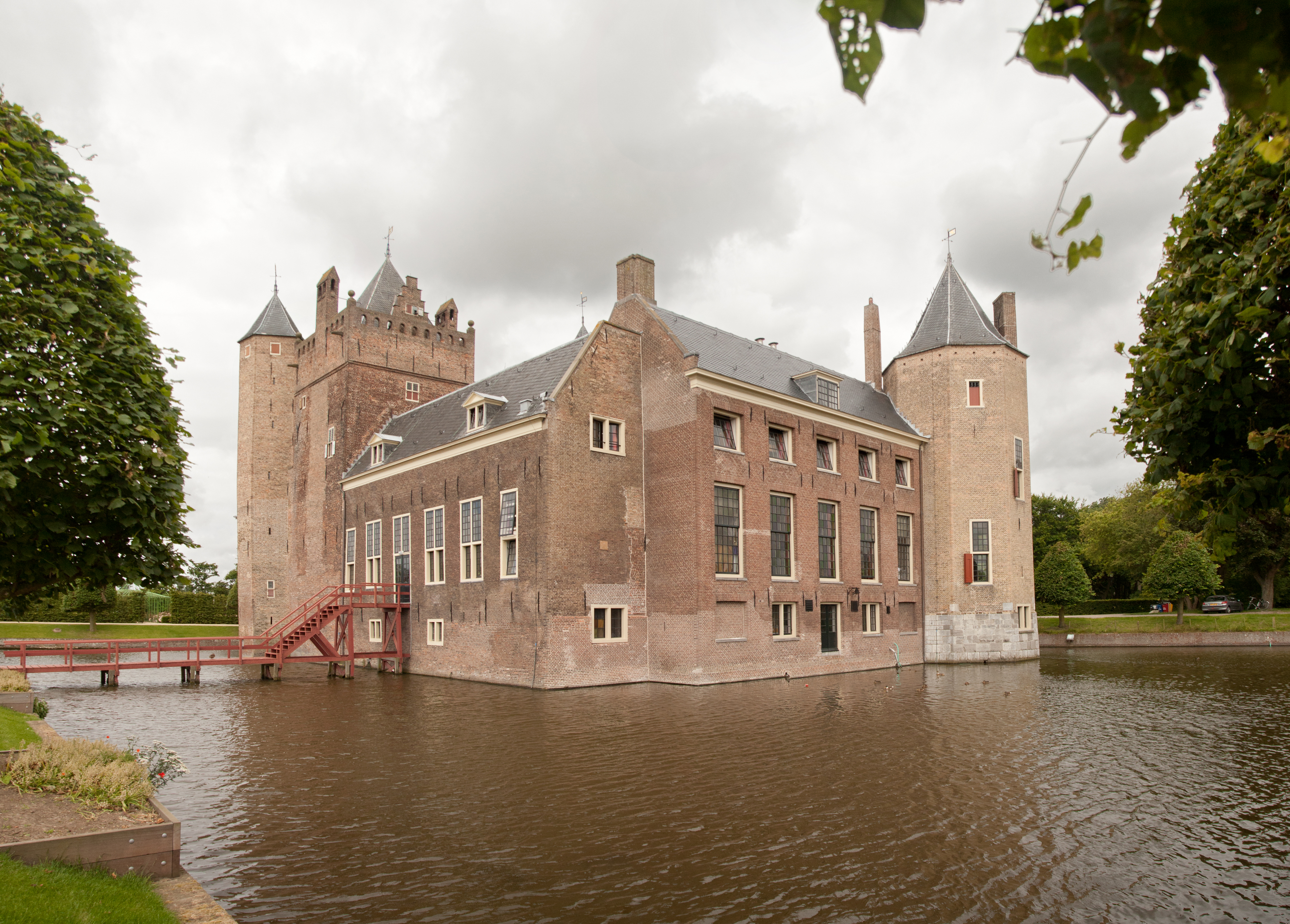
The nearby Slot Assumburg in Heemskerk

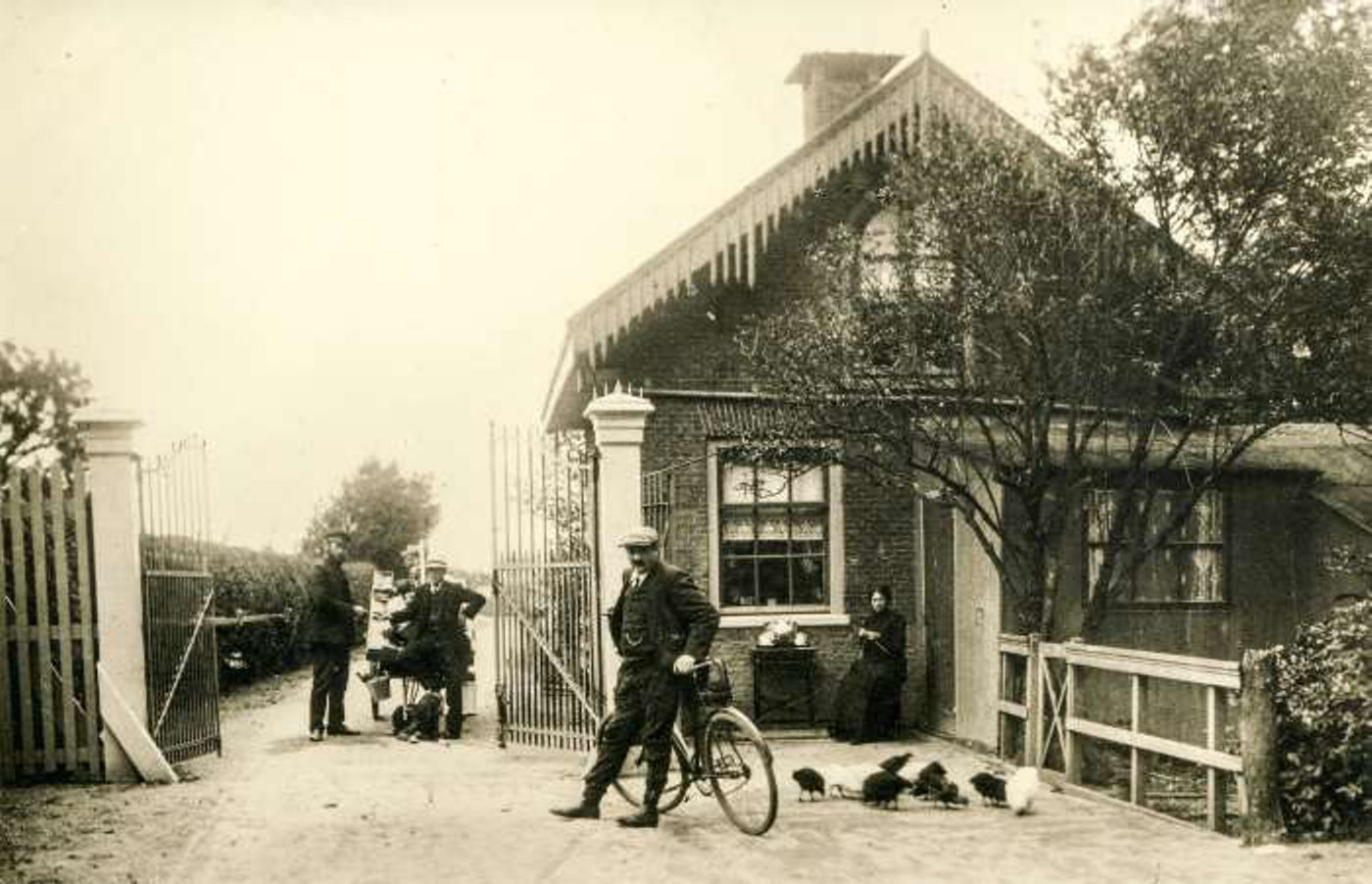
Toll fence in Assum, c. 1914

== Notable people ==
- Niels Kokmeijer (born 1977), professional football player
