= Karel van Mander =

Flemish painter, poet and art historian (1548–1606)

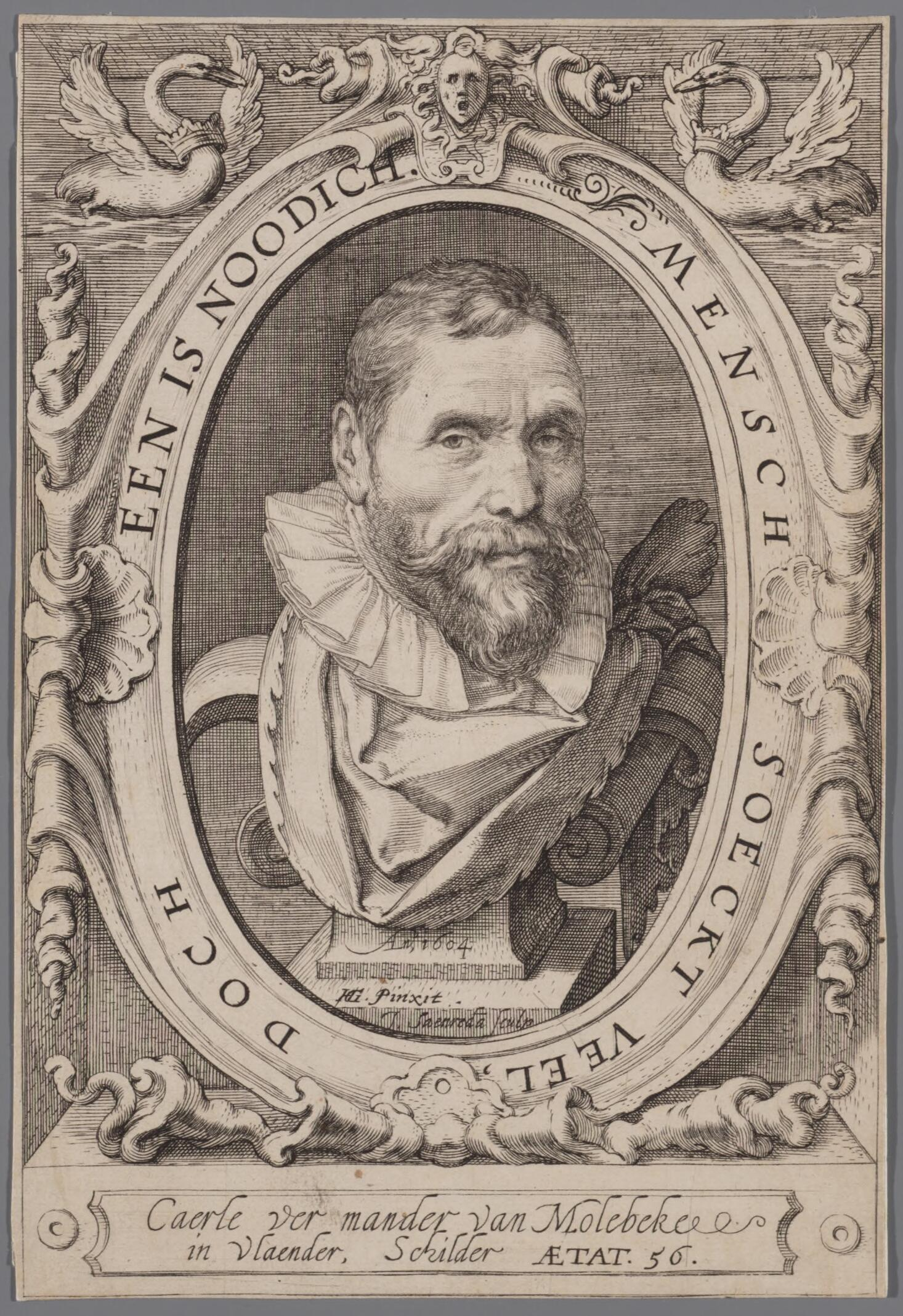
- Portrait of van Mander from his book
- Born: May 1548; Meulebeke, Habsburg Netherlands
- Died: 2 September 1606 (aged 58); Amsterdam, Dutch Republic
- Education: Lucas de Heere and Pieter Vlerick
- Known for: Painting, poetry, writing
- Notable work: Schilder-boeck (1604), several paintings
- Movement: Mannerism
- Patrons: Haarlem city council

Karel van Mander (I) or Carel van Mander I (May 1548 – 2 September 1606) was a Flemish painter, playwright, poet, art historian and art theoretician, who established himself in the Dutch Republic in the latter part of his life. He is mainly remembered as a biographer of Early Netherlandish painters and Northern Renaissance artists in his Schilder-boeck. As an artist and art theoretician he played a significant role in the spread and development of Northern Mannerism in the Dutch Republic.

== Life ==
Most of the information about Karel van Mander's life is based on a brief and anonymous biographical sketch included in the posthumous second edition of the Schilder-boeck published in 1618 by Jacob Pietersz Wachter. It is not certain who wrote this biographical sketch with the title t Geslacht, de geboort, plaets, tydt, leven, ende wercken van Karel van Mander, schilder, en poeet, mitsgaders zyn overlyden, ende begraeffenis (The lineage, birth, place, time, life, and works of Karel van Mander, painter and poet, including his death and burial). Various candidates have been proposed including his brother Adam van Mander and the author Gerbrand Adriaensz. Bredero. It has been argued more recently that his son Karel van Mander the Younger was the author of the biographical. He would have relied on biographical information that Karel van Mander had written himself as well as on his own recollections and notes. The information in the biographical sketch is not entirely reliable but is still regarded as the best source of information on van Mander's life.

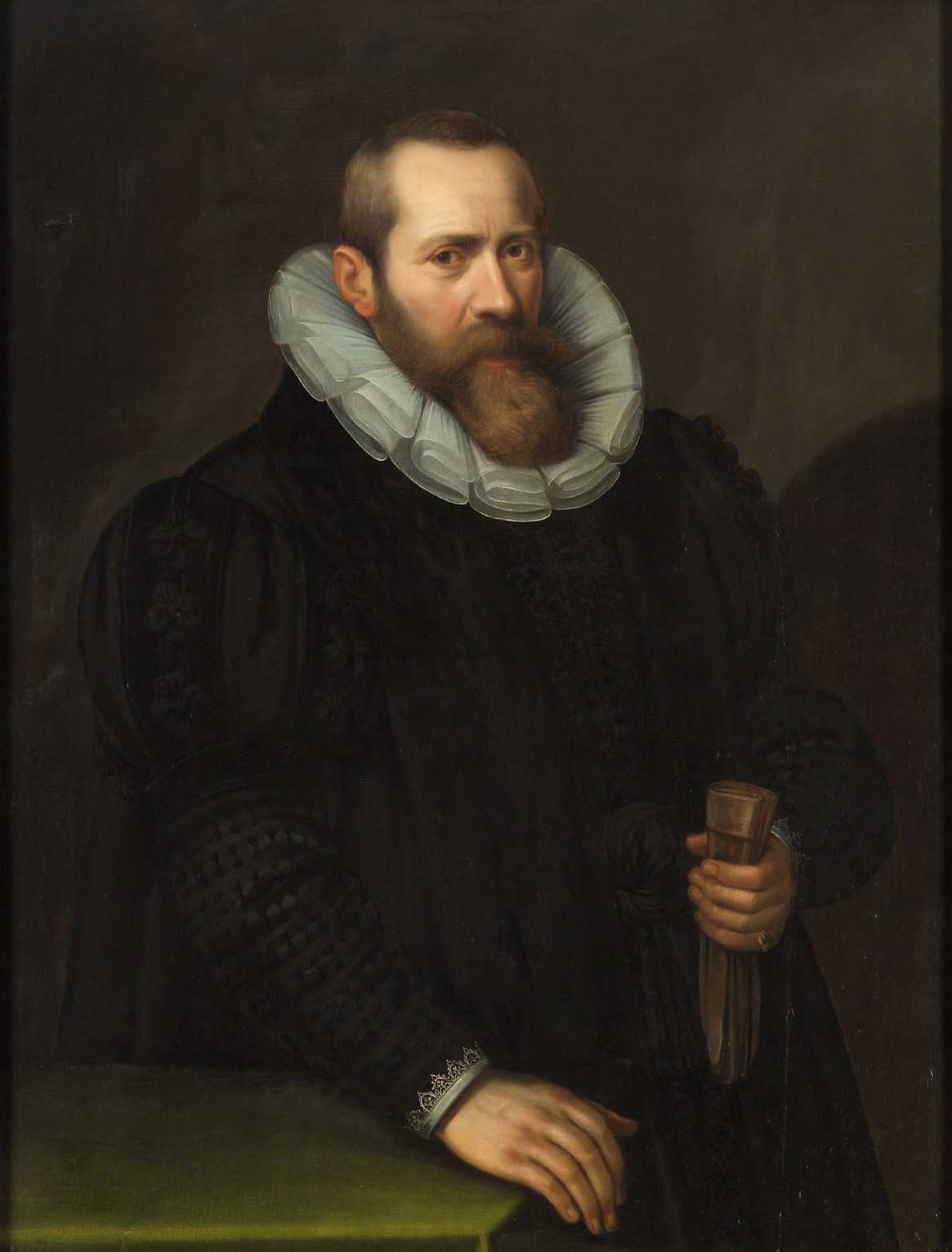
Portrait of a man, Kunsthistorisches Museum

Van Mander was born into a noble family in Meulebeke, in the County of Flanders. He studied under Lucas de Heere in Ghent. De Heere was a versatile artist who was painter, watercolorist, print artist, biographer, playwright, poet and writer. During the period 1568-1569 van Mander studied with the painter Pieter Vlerick in Kortrijk. The next five years he was less occupied with painting than with the writing of religious plays for which he also painted the scenery. He built quite a reputation in Flanders with his theatre productions.

In 1573 he travelled to Rome in the company of some young nobles. He stayed in Rome for more than three years. There he was active as a painter and became acquainted with patronage. For the Italian count Michelangelo Spada he made some frescoes with scenes of the Parisian blood wedding of 1572 in the Palazzo Spada in Terni. He also received commissions for frescoes with landscapes from several cardinals. He studied and became proficient in the painting of grotesques during his Roman residence.

His biographical sketch refers to van Mander as the discoverer of "caves" in Rome. This may be a reference to the Catacombs of Rome although the exact meaning of the reference is unclear. In Rome he may also have come into contact with fellow Flemish painter Bartholomeus Spranger, who left Rome in 1575 for Vienna to enter into the service of the emperor. On his return journey he passed through Vienna, where, together with Spranger and the sculptor Hans Mont, he made the triumphal arch for the royal entry of the emperor Rudolf II.

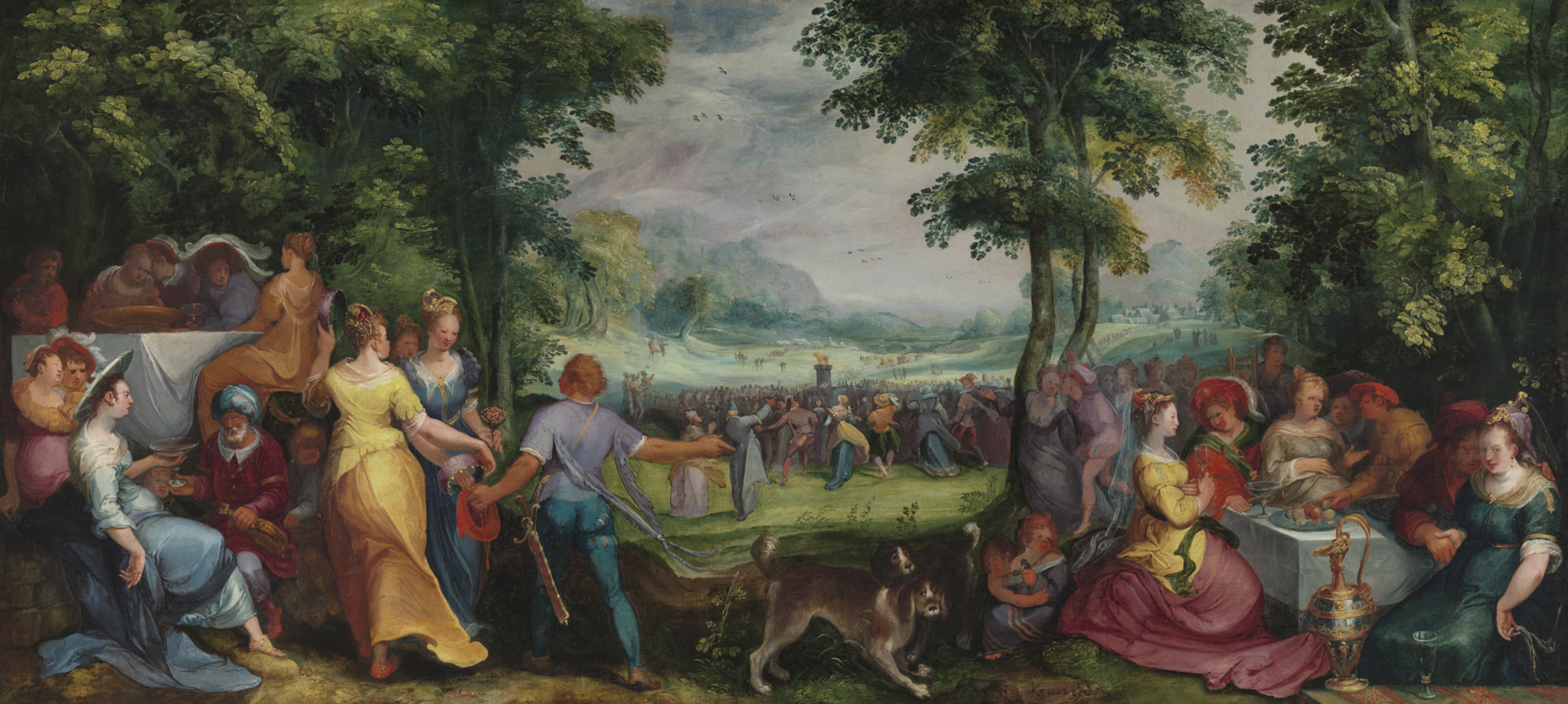
The adoration of the golden calf, Frans Hals Museum

Van Mander settled back in his native Meulebeke in 1578 where he was active as a painter and writer. He married an 18-year-old local girl, with whom he had a son. In 1580 he left for Kortrijk due to religious troubles caused by Catholic zealots in Meulebeke. Karel van Mander had at some point become a Mennonite and was therefore a possible target of these zealots. In Kortrijk he got a commission for an altar piece. In Kortrijk another son was born. He left Kortrijk for Bruges in 1582 because of an outbreak of the plague and other reasons. In Bruges, he worked with the painter Paul Weyts. Because of the threat of religious troubles and the plague, Karel fled with his family and his mother-in-law by ship to the Dutch Republic where he settled in Haarlem in the province of Holland in 1583.

Here he worked for 20 years on a commission by the Haarlem city fathers to inventory "their" art collection. The city of Haarlem had confiscated all Catholic religious art after the satisfactie van Haarlem, which gave Catholics equal rights to Protestants, had been overturned in 1578. Van Mander used his work on the commission in his "Schilder-boeck". While in Haarlem he continued to paint, concentrating his energy on his favourite genre: historical allegories. In 1603 he rented a fortified manor ("het Huis te Zevenbergen"), later renamed Marquette Castle in Heemskerk to proofread his book that was published in 1604. He died soon after it was published in Amsterdam at the age of 58.

== Haarlem Mannerists ==
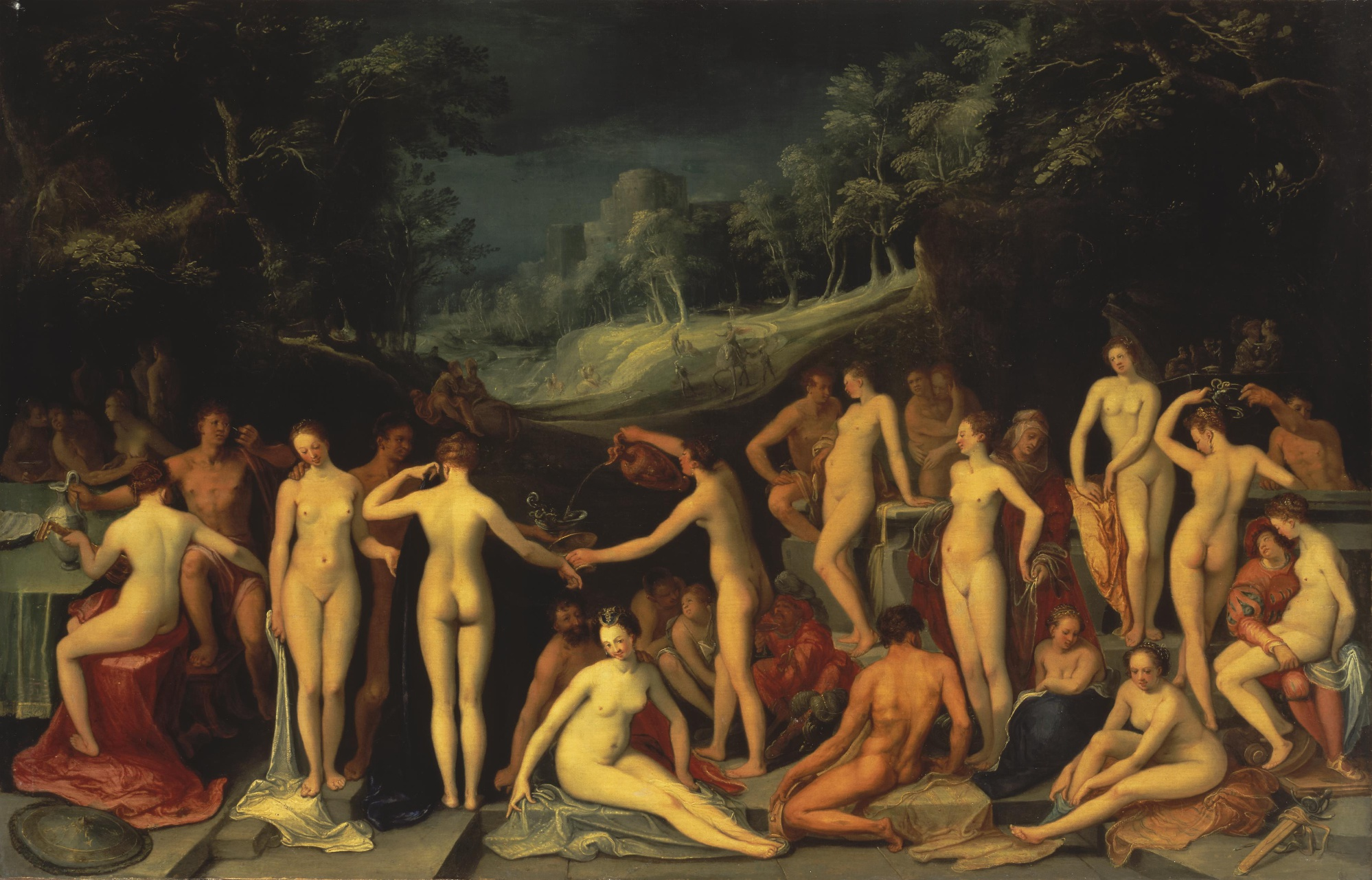
Garden of Love, 1602, Hermitage Museum

Karel van Mander was the founder, together with Hubertus Goltzius and Cornelis van Haarlem, of an "academy to study after life". It is not entirely clear what this academy did but it is believed it was an informal discussion group which may have organised drawing classes with life models. It has also been claimed that the nature of the academy was more of a literary nature.

He had an important impact on art in the Dutch Republic when in 1585 he showed his friend Hendrick Goltzius drawings by Bartholomeus Spranger. Spranger was then the leading artist of Northern Mannerism and was based in Prague as the court artist of emperor Rudolf II. These drawings had a galvanising effect on Goltzius whose style was influenced by them. Goltzius made engravings of the drawings which were important in disseminating the Mannerist style. Van Mander, Goltzius and Cornelis van Haarlem became known as the "Haarlem Mannerists" and artists from other towns joined the movement. Their pictorial language was characterised by a strong awareness of style and cultivated elegance. They strove for artful ingenuity rather than naturalism. They also had a preference for depicting exaggeratedly brawny musclemen, violent drama, wild fantasy and a heightened richness of detail. The dissemination of the engravings of Goltzius went hand in hand with the new practice of art theorisation that was new to the 16th century and in which Karel van Mander played an important role.

He received budding artists in his home for evenings of communal drawing and study of classical mythology. After the iconoclasm of the Calvinists, religious themes had gone out of fashion and mythology had become popular. However, few painters could afford a trip to Italy such as the one that van Mander had undertaken. His purpose was to educate young painters in the proper artistic techniques. He was a firm believer in the hierarchy of genres. It was his firm belief that only through proper study of existing works it was possible to realize true-to-life historical allegories.

His own works included mannerist mythological subjects, but also portraits and genre paintings influenced by Pieter Bruegel the Elder, such as the Kermis in the Hermitage Museum. Relatively few paintings by him survive.

== Writings ==
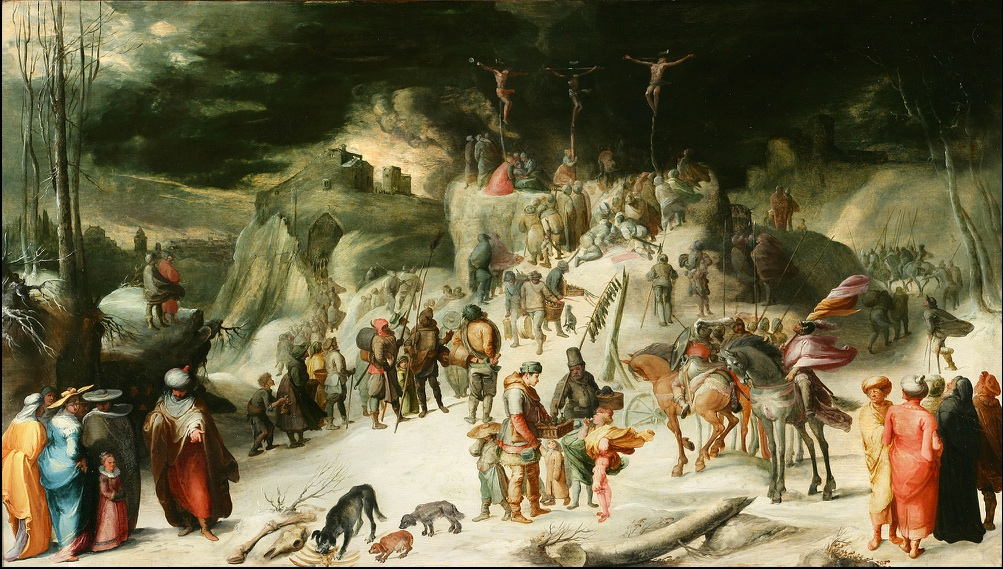
Landscape with snow and the Crucifixion, 1599, Private Collection

As a writer van Mander worked in various genres: drama, poetry, songs, biography and art theory. He also translated classical literature. His literary production reflects the two sides of his intellectual and spiritual interests: the humanism of the Renaissance and the religious convictions of a pious mennonite. His earliest works were biblical plays that he wrote while still in Flanders. These have not been preserved.

His first spiritual writings are contained in De Gulden Harpe, published in 1597. This poetry volume consists of rather longwinded versification of biblical stories that were intended to educate readers with biblical words. His style developed under the influence of his translation (from the French) of classical literature such as the Iliad and, in particular, the Bucolica en Georgica of Virgil. He abandoned the heavy style of the rhetoricians for the jambs of Virgil in his bundle of spiritual songs published in 1613 after his death under the title Bethlehem dat is het Broodhuys.

== Schilder-boeck ==
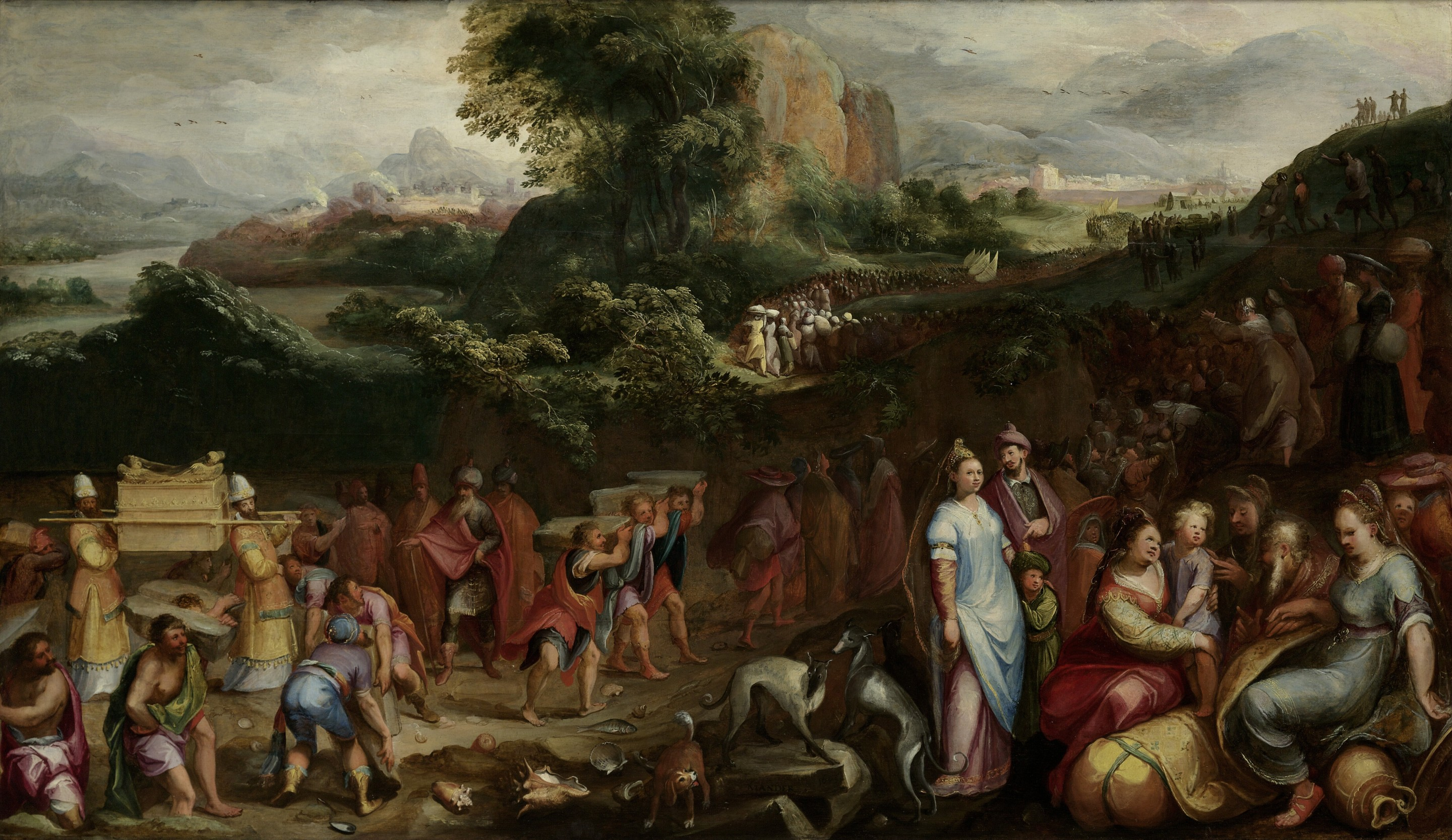
Crossing the Jordan, 1605, Museum Boijmans Van Beuningen, Rotterdam

Karel van Mander's Schilder-boeck, written in 17th century Dutch and published in Haarlem in 1604 by Passchier van Wesbusch, describes the life and work of more than 250 painters, both historical and contemporary, and explains contemporary art theory for aspiring painters. During his travels and stay in Italy, van Mander had read and was influenced by Giorgio Vasari's famous biographical accounts of painters in his book Lives of the Most Excellent Painters, Sculptors, and Architects, often referred to as the Vite. It was published in 1550 and republished in 1568 with woodcuts, which is the version van Mander probably studied. He set about translating this work into Dutch and it was during this project that he was offered the commission to inventory Haarlem's art collection, a job that resulted in the chapters of his book on Early Netherlandish painters. In both books, the lives of the painters are told in the standard "Vita di ..." manner of Catholic saints, extolling the virtues of the painters one by one in several chapters. In van Mander's book many entries on Italian painters were simply translated or adapted from the Italian Vite, but the biographical details on early Netherlandish painters and, in particular the Haarlem painters, are unique and gathered during van Mander's commission.

Karel van Mander's book also contains an interpretation of the stories in Ovid's Metamorphoses. This was meant as an aid to artists who wished to paint mythological themes rather than religious ones. Symbolism was very important in painting at the time, and the use of Ovid's characters, combined with the proper use of artistic symbolism allowed the artist to tell a specific story. The last chapter of the Schilder-Boeck describes the meaning of animals and other figures.

== Legacy ==
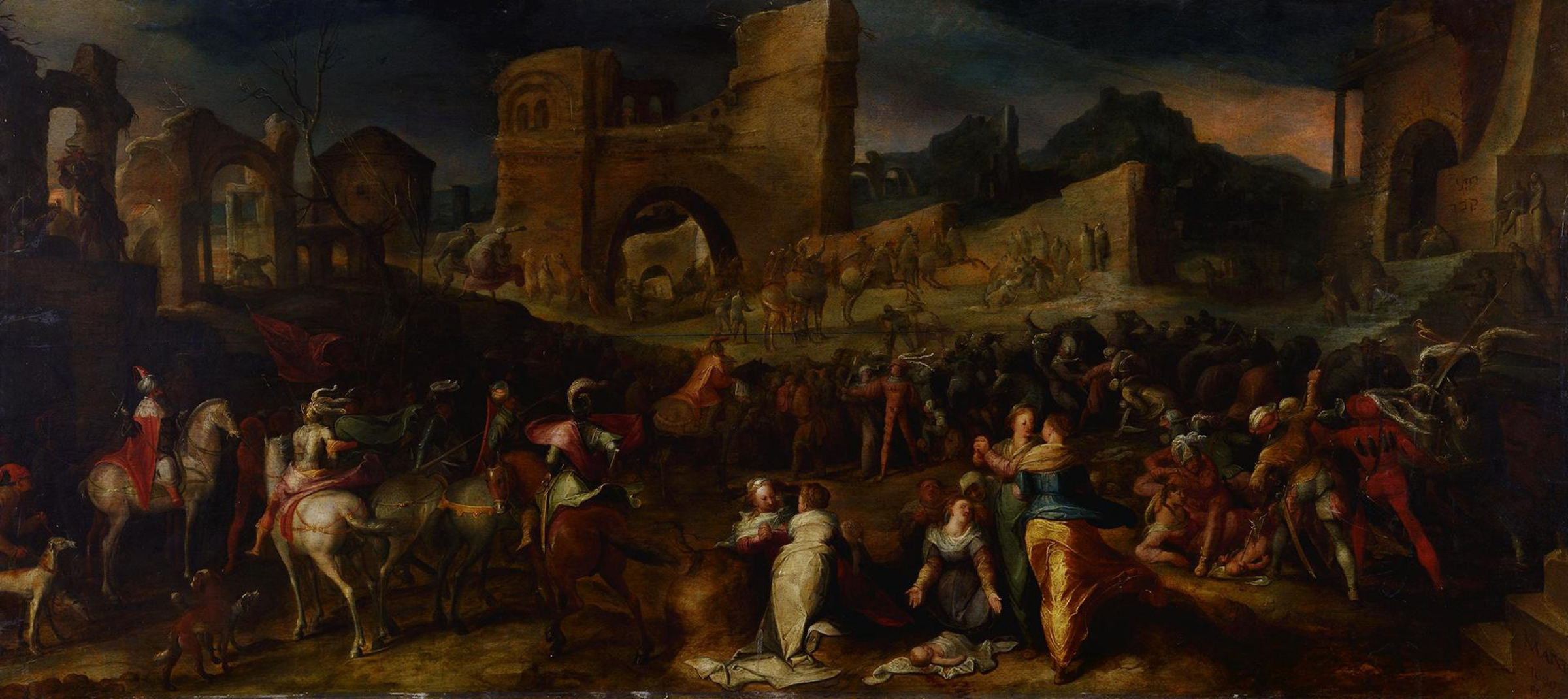
The Massacre of the Innocents (1600), Hermitage Museum

Van Mander was the master of Frans Hals. Frans Hals appears not to have shared van Mander's view that history painting was the highest in the hierarchy of genres, since Frans Hals produced almost solely portrait paintings.

The Schilder-Boeck introduced Dutch artists to Italian art and encouraged them to travel, if not follow the book's instructions on Italian painting methods. Aside from his son Karel van Mander the Younger and Frans Hals, his registered pupils were Cornelis Engelsz, Everard Crynsz van der Maes, Jacobus Martens (landscape painter and father of the painter Jan Martszen de Jonge), Jacob Martsen (genre painter), Jacob van Musscher, Hendrik Gerritsz Pot and François Venant.

Van Mander was further influential on art writing in the seventeenth and eighteenth centuries. Cornelis de Bie (Gulden Cabinet, 1662), Joachim von Sandrart (Teutsche Akademie, 1675), Filippo Baldinucci (Notizie de' Professori, 1681), and Arnold Houbraken (Schouburg, 1720) are some of the early biographers who used material from his Schilder-boeck for their biographical sketches of Netherlandish painters. His book is still the most-cited primary source in biographical accounts of the lives of many artists he included. Of most interest to art historians is his criticism of the work of these artists, especially when he describes the location and owner of the paintings, thus becoming a valuable source for art provenance. The Schilder-boeck is part of the Basic Library of Dutch Literature, which contains the 1000 most important works in Dutch literature from the Middle Ages to today.

== Public collections ==
- Museum Boijmans Van Beuningen, Rotterdam
- Rijksmuseum Amsterdam

== Literary works ==
- De harpe, oft des herten snarenspel (?)
- Het Herder Pijpken (?)
- Dat hooghe liedt Salomo, met noch andere gheestelycke liedekens (1595)
- Bucolica en Georgica, dat is, Ossen-stal en Landt-werck (1597)
- De harpe, oft des herten snarenspel (1599)
- De kerck der deucht (1600)
- Een schriftuerlijck Liedeken van Jephtah. Op de wijse (1600)
- History-Lied van den Ouden Tobias. Op de wijse Venus der minnen Godinnen (1600)
- Het Herder Pijpken (1603)
- Het schilder-boeck (1604)
- Olijfbergh ofte poëma van den laetsten dagh (1609)
- Den Nederduytschen Helicon (1610)
- De eerste XII boecken vande Ilyadas (1611)
- Bethlehem dat is het Broodhuys (1613)
- De gulden harpe, inhoudende al de geestelijcke liedekens (1613)
- Bethlehem dat is het Broodhuys (1627)
- De gulden harpe, inhoudende al de liedekens, die voor desen by K.V.M. gemaeckt, ende in verscheyden Boecxkens uyt-ghegaen zijn (1627)
