= De Vergulde Wagen =

Coordinates: 52°30′49.53″N 4°39′8.53″E

- Interactive map of De Vergulde Wagen

Restaurant information
- Established: 1971
- Closed: 2011
- Location: Rijksstraatweg 161, Heemskerk, 1969 LE, Netherlands
- Seating capacity: 45

Restaurant De Vergulde Wagen is a defunct restaurant in Heemskerk, Netherlands. It was a fine dining restaurant that was awarded one Michelin star in 1995 and retained that rating until 1997. The restaurant closed in February 2011 when the owners retired after running the restaurants for 40 years.

GaultMillau awarded the restaurant 12 out of 20 points in 2011.

Head chef of the restaurant was Tineke Nieuwenhuizen.

== See also ==
- List of Michelin starred restaurants in the Netherlands
