= Everard Crijnsz. van der Maes =

Dutch painter (1577–1647)

- Born: 1577; The Hague
- Died: 1647 (aged 69–70); The Hague
- Style: portrait painting
- Movement: Dutch Golden Age

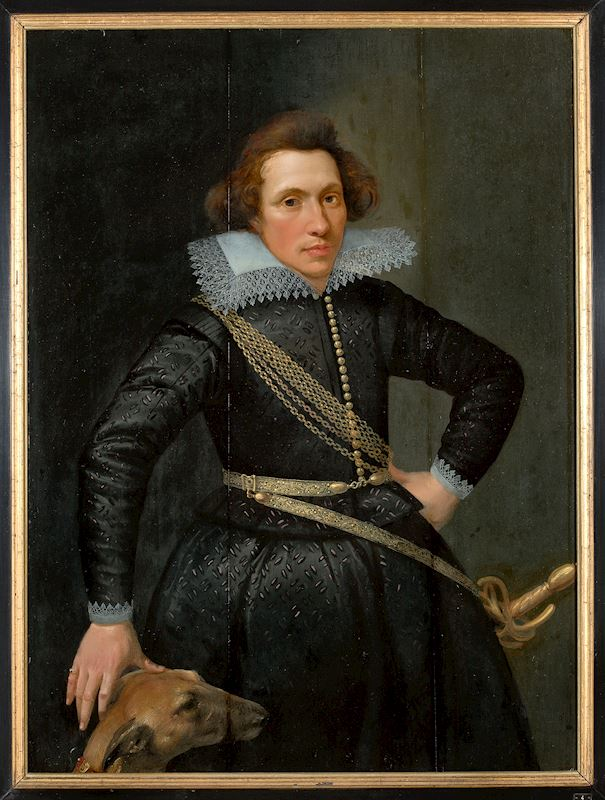
Portrait of Johan van Wassenaer

Everard "Evert" Crynsz. van der Maes (1577, The Hague – 1647, The Hague), was a Dutch Golden Age painter.

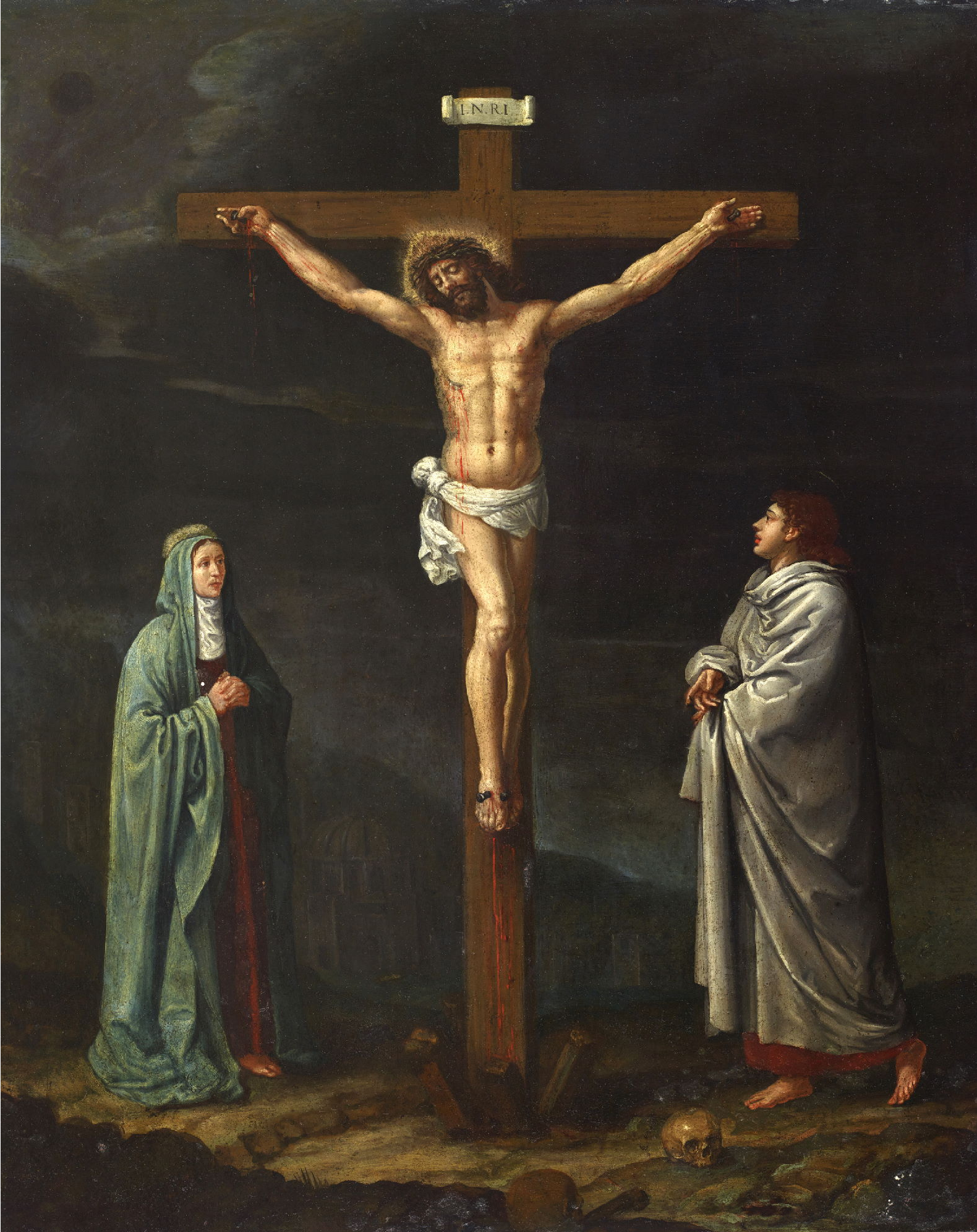
Jesus on the cross, Musée Sainte-Croix

== Biography ==
According to Karel van Mander he was a painter from The Hague who had travelled to Italy and had returned home shortly before the Schilder-boeck was written. Van Mander mentioned him together with another painter from The Hague, named Ravesteyn as being a good painter.

According to the RKD he was a pupil of his father, the painter Crijn Coensz. van der Maes, Quirijn Coenraetsz. Maes (probably another family member) and Karel van Mander himself. His father worked together with the painter Anthonie van Ravesteyn. He painted portraits and had several pupils later on in his own workshop. His registered pupils were Dirck van Cats, Cornelis de Jongh, Gijsbrecht Joosten, Pancras van Nispen, Joris van Schooten, Carel Swerius, Joris van Swerius, Abraham van Tijlburch, Pieter van de Venne, Pieter Vinne, Gerrit Adriaensz van Waspick, and Jan Jansz Westerbaen.
