= Marquette Castle =

18th-century manor house in the Netherlands

- Kasteel Marquette
- Heemskerk, the Netherlands
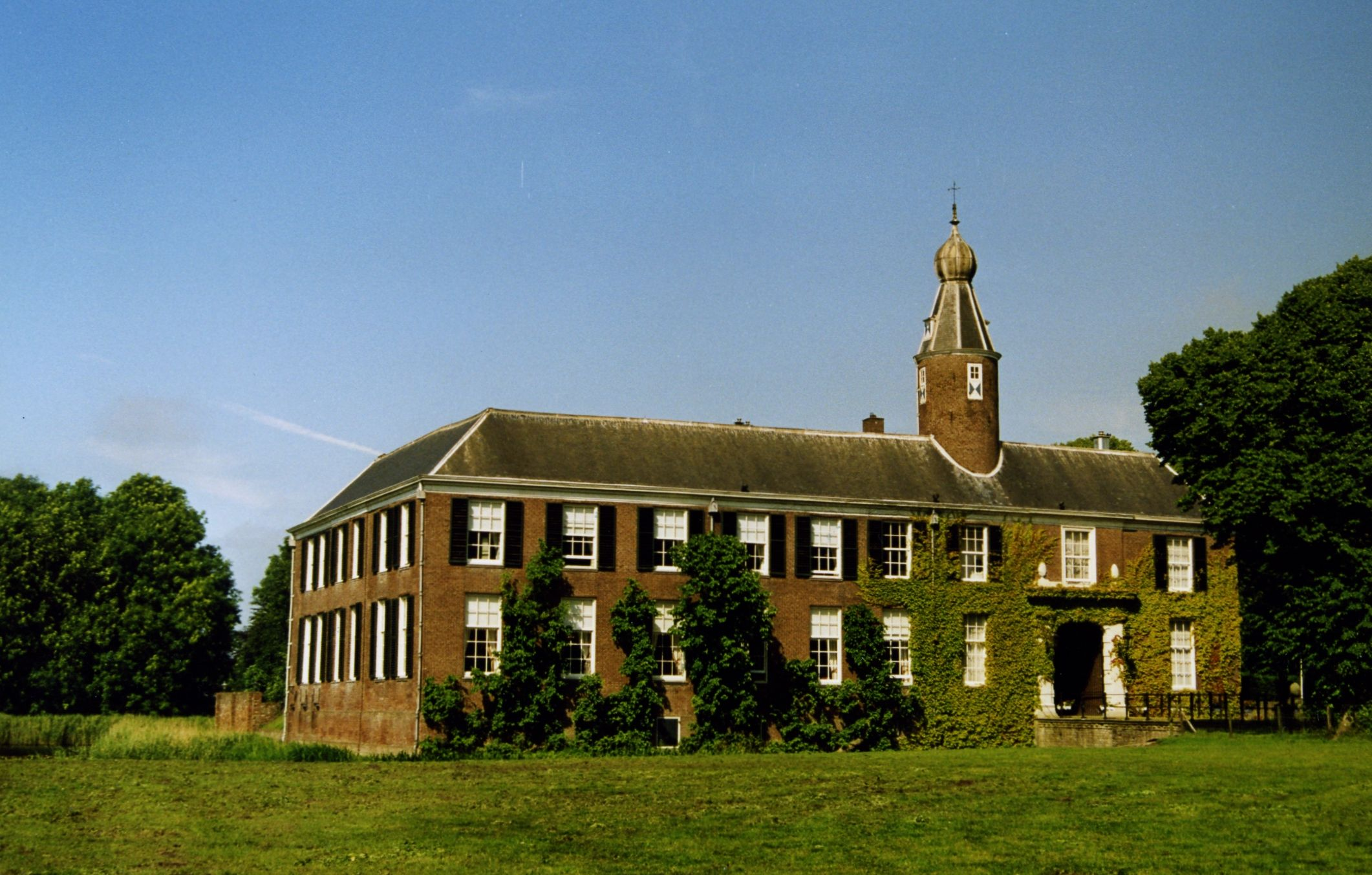
- Chateau Marquette (2010)

Site information
- Type: Water Castle
- Owner: private

Location
- The Netherlands
- Location within North Holland
- Coordinates: 52.520904°N 4.668446°E

Site history
- Built: 13th century
- Battles/wars: Siege of 1358

Marquette Castle is an 18th-century manor house in Heemskerk, Netherlands, occupying the site of the previous 13th-century Heemkskerk Castle, or Huis te Heemskerk.

== Castle Characteristics ==
=== Heemskerk, the first castle ===
The first version of Marquette Castle was a round water castle dating from the 13th century. The round water castle is known from many old pictures. These suggest at least one building along its wall. They also show its later use as a walled garden with a pond.

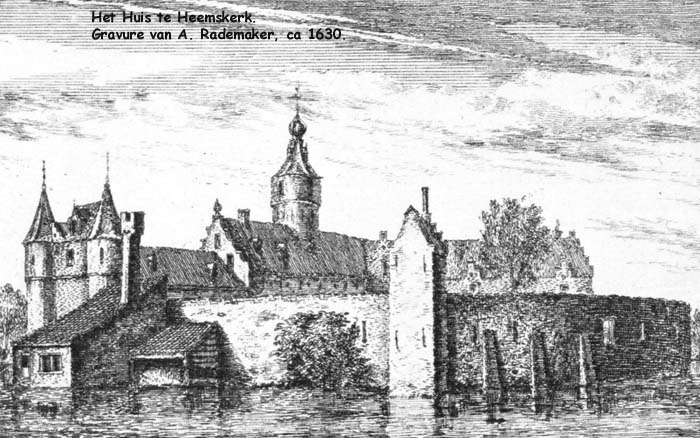
The castle in about 1630

In 1802 the last remains of the water castle were demolished. All that remained were the very wide moats. In 2021 the castle terrains were investigated with ground-penetrating radar and two other non-invasive techniques. These showed the water castle, as well as its gatehouse. The outer diameter of the water castle proved to have been about 40 m. This is larger than Egmond Castle's round water castle which measures slightly less than 30 m.

Apart from the known round water castle, other parts of the first castle are unknown. It might have been that there was a predecessor on what later became the outer bailey of the round water castle.

The water castle was probably deserted in the later fourteenth century, as its defensive capabilities had become obsolete. The buildings on the outer bailey were then changed, and enlarged to become the precursor of the current castle.

=== Marquette, the current castle ===
The current castle consists of two parallel wings, and a perpendicular small gate wing. The relation to the previous castle has not been investigated very well. Separate finds have not been analyzed, and not much has been published about it.

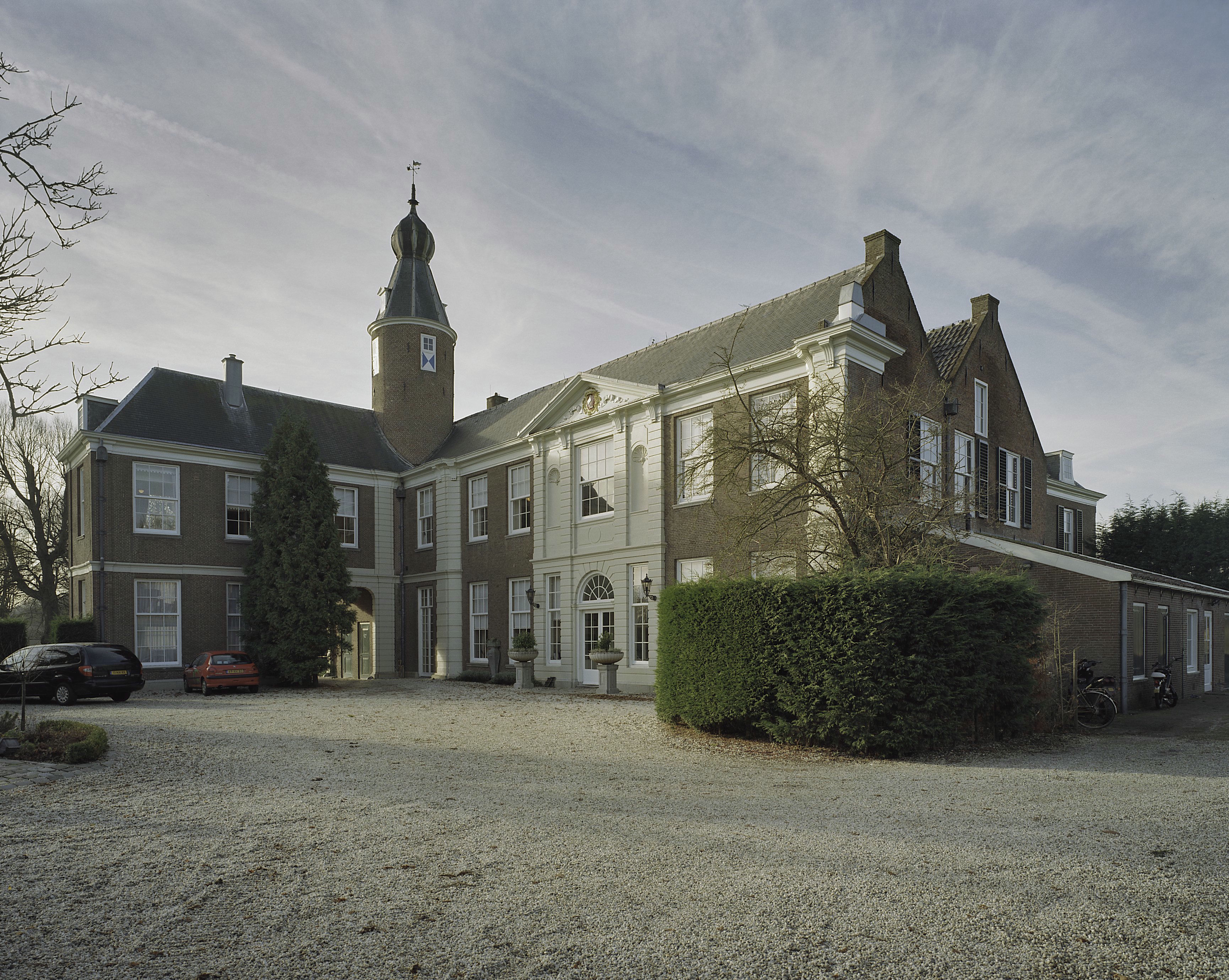
East wing with avant-corps

The current castle has three vaulted basements. One of them shows a thick wall of thirteenth century brick. A chapel from about 1555 can be seen west of the bridge on the between 1741 and 1759 picture. Its entrance was later found in the second basement. During the renovation of the kitchen in 1980, a fireplace was found that might date from the fourteenth or fifteenth century.

The castle is known to have become a manor in the first quarter of the sixteenth century. At that time Daniël de Hertaing Lord of Marquette-en-Ostrevant started to change the castle, and renamed it for his lost Lordship of Marquette. All that remains from this time is the high stair tower.

In 1738-1741 Pieter Rendorp designed the stately eastern wing with its double roof, avant-corps and stone pilaster strips. The decoration of the gate also belongs to this time. The western wing dates from about 1780, when the castle got its largest extension. A northern section was built at about the same time. This, as well as some other parts where demolished again in the early nineteenth century. The terraces on the north side are the lowest part of the northern section.

The interior has a corridor with a marble floor and stucco in Louis XIV style. There is a summer dining room in Louis XV style, and a Chinese room with painted wall paper. In 1911 the early 18th century carpentry of the ballroom of nearby Assumburg Castle was placed at Marquette.

== History ==
=== Van Heemskerk (c. 1250-1475) ===
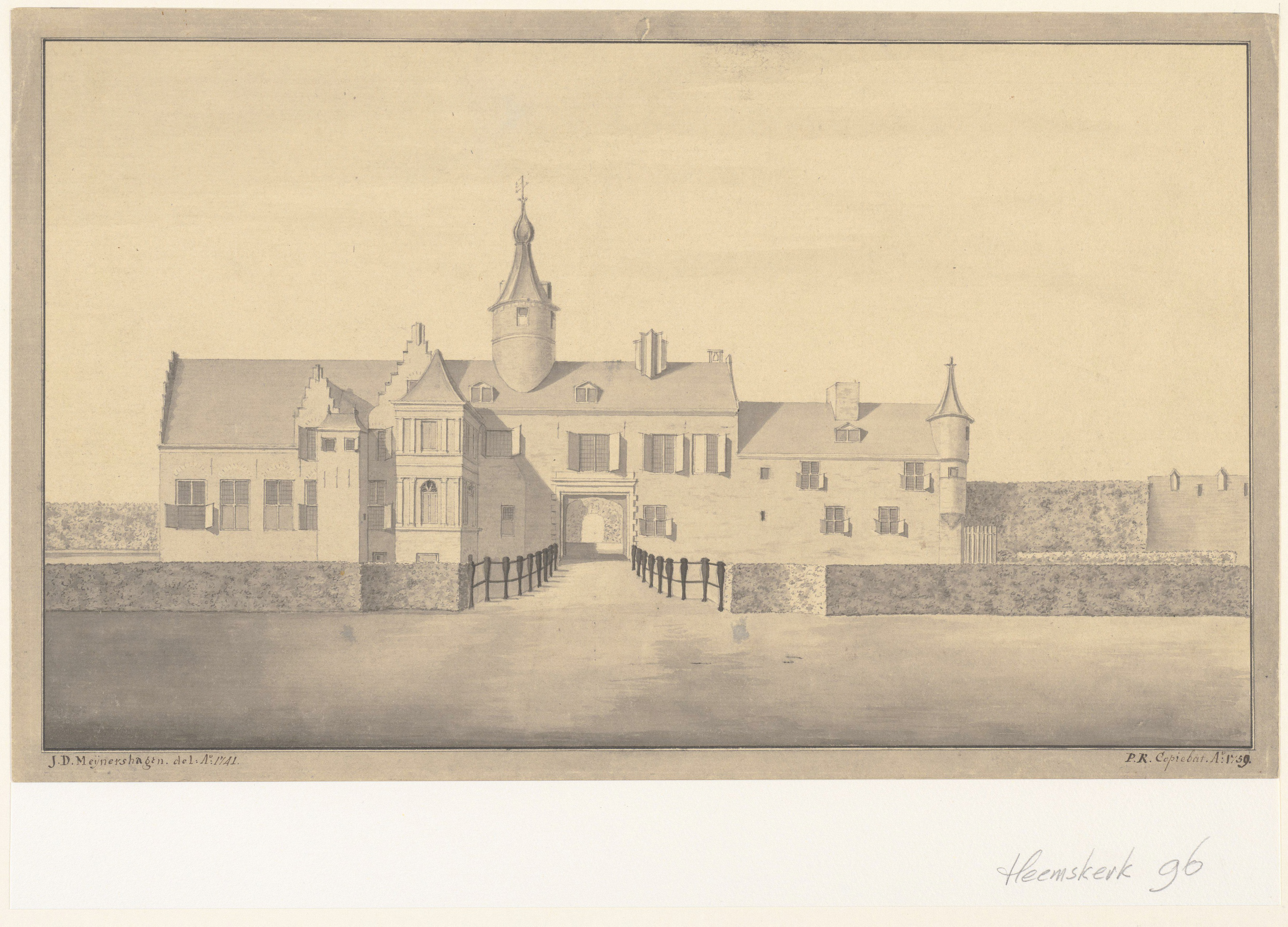
Between 1741 and 1759

Count William II of Holland, who ruled from 1247 to 1256 ordered the construction of roads and castles in order to subdue the West Frisians. Heemskerk Castle, then known as huys te Eemskercke was one of these. It led to an unusually high concentration of castles around Heemskerk. See Oud Haerlem Castle for details of this concentration and a map.

The exact role of the count in the construction of Marquette is unknown. He might have build the round water castle, or a building on the outer bailey. In January 1300 Gerard II van Heemskerk transferred his allodial Heemskerk Castle to John II, Count of Holland, and had it granted back to him as a fief inheritable by sons, daughters and even sideways.

Gerard's son Gerard III van Heemskerk (c. 1300–1358) was a leader of the Cod Alliance during the Hook and Cod wars. He held Dirk III van Brederode prisoner at Marquette in 1354.

In October 1358 Gerard's son Wouter van Heemskerk (c. 1330 - 1380) tried to assassinate Reinoud van Brederode, bailiff of Kennemerland. Reinoud escaped, and regent Count Albert started a siege of Heemskerk Castle in November. In March 1359 the castle surrendered. Wouter and his wife were allowed to leave with some of their personal possessions. The castle itself was occupied by the count. After the siege Wouter's role in the assassination was investigated. He had to pay 7000 shield shields for reconciliation. In 1380 Wouter died without legal offspring.

=== Van Zevenbergen (1475-1560) ===
In 1475 Joost van Strijen lord of Zevenbergen (?-1476), inherited Heemskerk Castle from his grandmother Clementina van Heemskerk. In 1529 his sister Maria van Strijen van Zevenbergen transferred it to her son Corneille of Berghes (c.1500-1560). He became Prince-Bishopric of Liège in 1538. In 1544 Corneille resigned and got married. He died without legal offspring.

=== Van Arenberg (1560-1610) ===
In 1560 Jean de Ligne, Count of Arenberg (1525-1568) inherited Heemskerk Castle as nephew of Corneille. Jean was killed in the first year of the Eighty Years' War. His family moved south when the county fell to the rebels. During the Twelve Years' Truce many fugitives on both sides took the opportunity to sell estates that they had fled. This also applied to the Arenbergs.

=== Marquette (1610-1717) ===
In 1610 Daniël de Hertaing Lord of Marquette-en-Ostrevant (?-1625) bought Heemskerk Castle. In 1612 he got permission from the States of Holland to rename Heemskerk Castle to Marquette Castle. He was governor of Oostende during the famous Siege of Ostend (1601-1604). De Hertaing had three sons: Willem an infantry captain, Hendrik, and Colonel Maximilian. In 1655 they were succeeded by Petronella, baroness of Wassenaar and Duvenvoorde.

=== Rendorp (1717-1909) ===
In 1717 the Amsterdamse brewer and mayor Joachim Rendorp bought Marquette. He had a son Pieter Rendorp (1703–1760), married to Margaretha Calkoen. Pieter was an amateur architect, and changed Marquette to his own design. Their son Joachim Rendorp (1728-1792) became an influential politician, and gave Marquette its greatest extent.

The French period greatly impoverished the Netherlands, and was followed by decades of stagnation. It was a disaster for many rich families, and led to the demolishment of many parts of Marquette Castle. Jacob van Rendorp van Marquette (1795-1879) was a volunteer in the 1813 struggle for independence, and was wounded in the 1815 Battle of Quatre Bras. He was mayor of Heemskerk and mayor of Castricum till 1867. He was married to A.C.M. van Deutz van Assendelft (?-1869).

=== Gevers (1855-1977) ===
In 1855 Jacob van Rendorp van Marquette's daughter Paulina van Rendorp van Marquette married Jan Hugo Gevers (1829-1891). Their son Hugo became mayor of Heemskerk in 1888, and lived at the castle with his wife Paulina Adriana van Lennep (1869-1947). After Hugo's death in 1921, Marquette was left uninhabited. After World War II Hugo's son Abraham Gevers (1901-1989) settled at Marquette with his wife Christine baroness de Vos van Steenwijk (1916).

== Commercial use (1979) ==
In 1977 A.D.Th Gevers van Marquette sold the estate of 61.5 hectares to BV Onroerende Goederen Maatschappij de Omval. In 1980 Noord-Holland province bought the land of the estate, without the castle, for 2,750,000 guilders. Marquette Castle itself was renovated for 6,000,000 guilders, and taken into use as a conference- and party center in 1981. This enterprise failed, in part because it lacked a parking lot. It closed down on 31 December 1982.

In 1984 the Swiss Sodereal Group, later Swiss Tradition Hotels, became the new owner. In 1985 Marquette was reopened with a hotel building at 650 m distance. This combination with a hotel was rather successful. In 1986 the ministers for foreign affairs of the EU conferred at the hotel. Nevertheless, in 1988 the management was transferred to Mercury Hotel Group. Mercury was succeeded by NH Hotel Group, which published the booklet Château Marquette about the history and current state of the castle and its interior.

The current owner of Chateau Marquette is Erik Kuiper-van den Berg. In 2018 he financed the acquisition via crowdfunding.

== Gallery ==
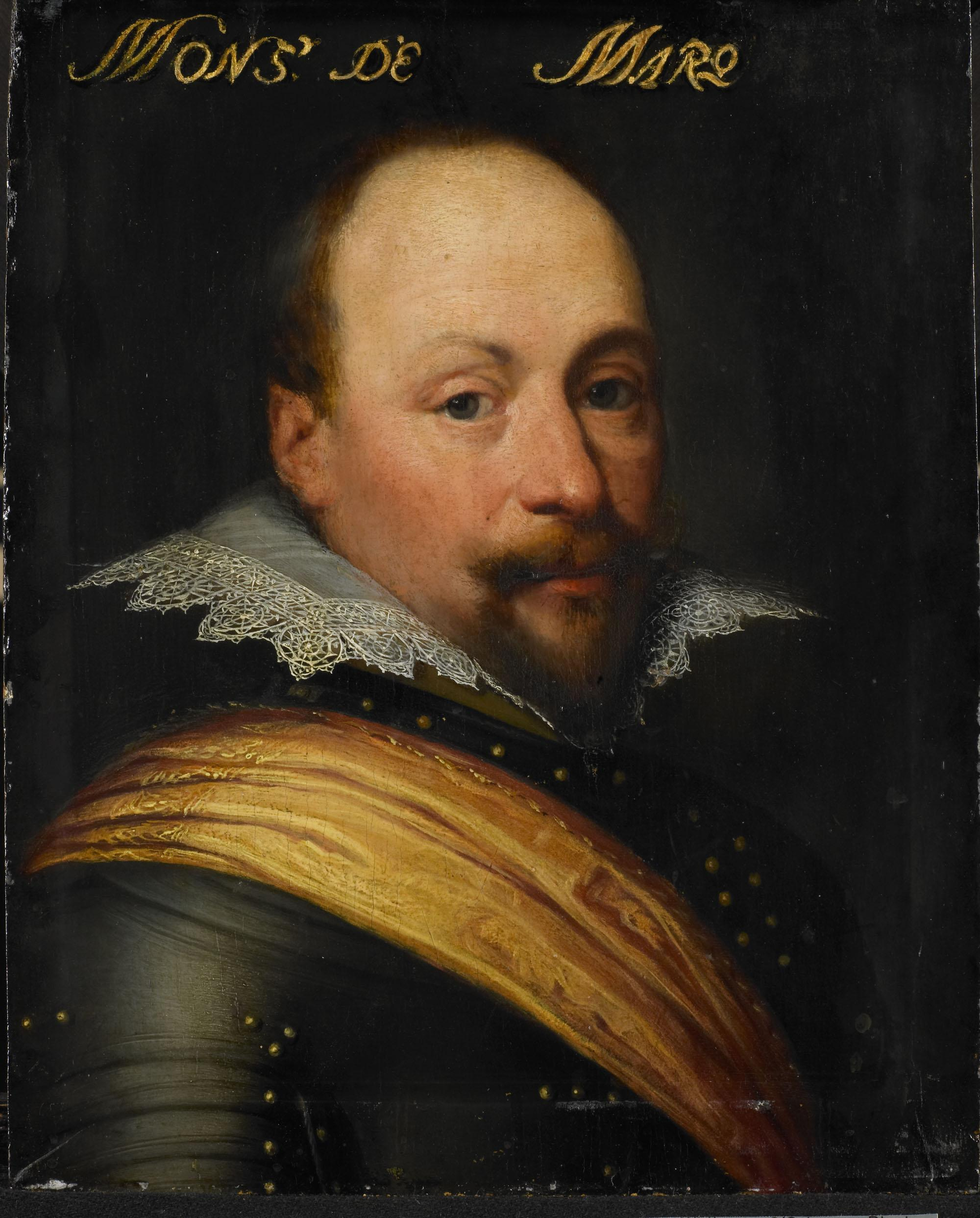
Daniel d'Hertaing

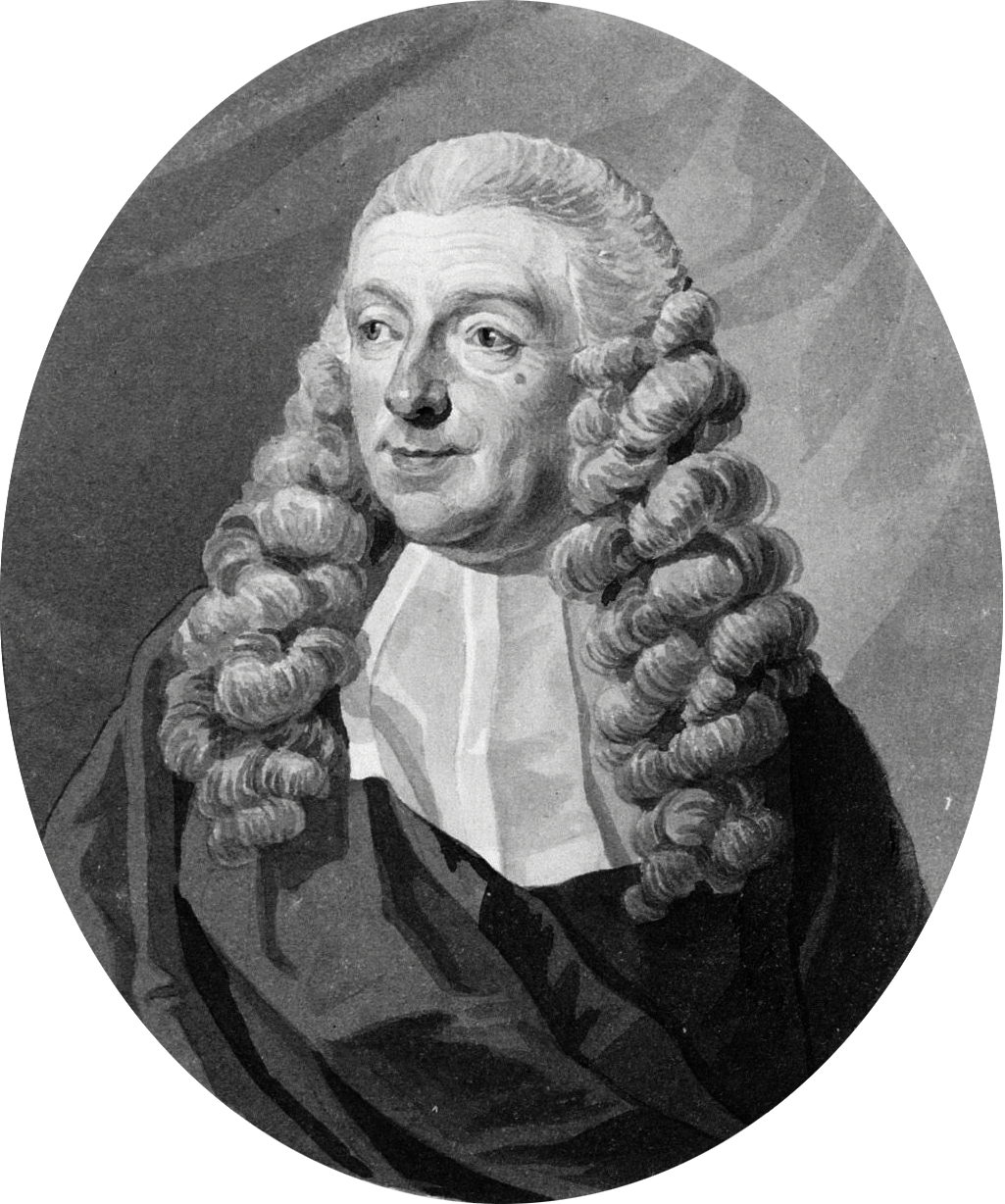
Joachim Rendorp
