= Jacob van Musscher =

Dutch Golden Age painter

Jacob van Musscher (1580–1623) was a Dutch Golden Age painter.

== Biography ==
Van Musscher was born in Emden. According to Houbraken he was called Jaques de Moschero and was one of 5 pupils of Karel van Mander; the others were, Korn. Engelsz, Hendr. Gerretz., Fr. Venant and especially Frans Hals.

According to Karel van Mander who called him Iaques de Mosscher, he lived in Delft while he was writing, and was experienced and able in all forms of art.

According to the RKD he was also known as Jacob Fransz, was a pupil of Karel van Mander, and he was the grandfather of Michiel van Musscher. He became a member of the Haarlem Guild of St. Luke in 1593 as Jacques Musschaert, and was married in Januari 1603 in Delft. He died in Delft.

He may have been the father of the landscape painter Jacob van Moscher of Haarlem.
