= Joris van Schooten =

Dutch painter

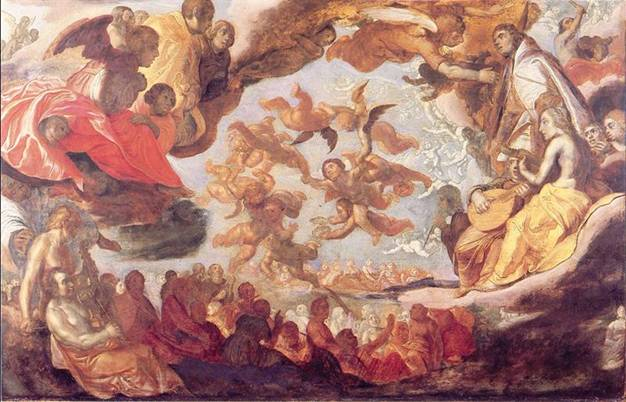
Crown of Life, Lutheran church of Leiden.

Joris van Schooten (1587–1651) was a Dutch Golden Age painter and the uncle of the Leiden mathematician Frans van Schooten.

== Biography ==
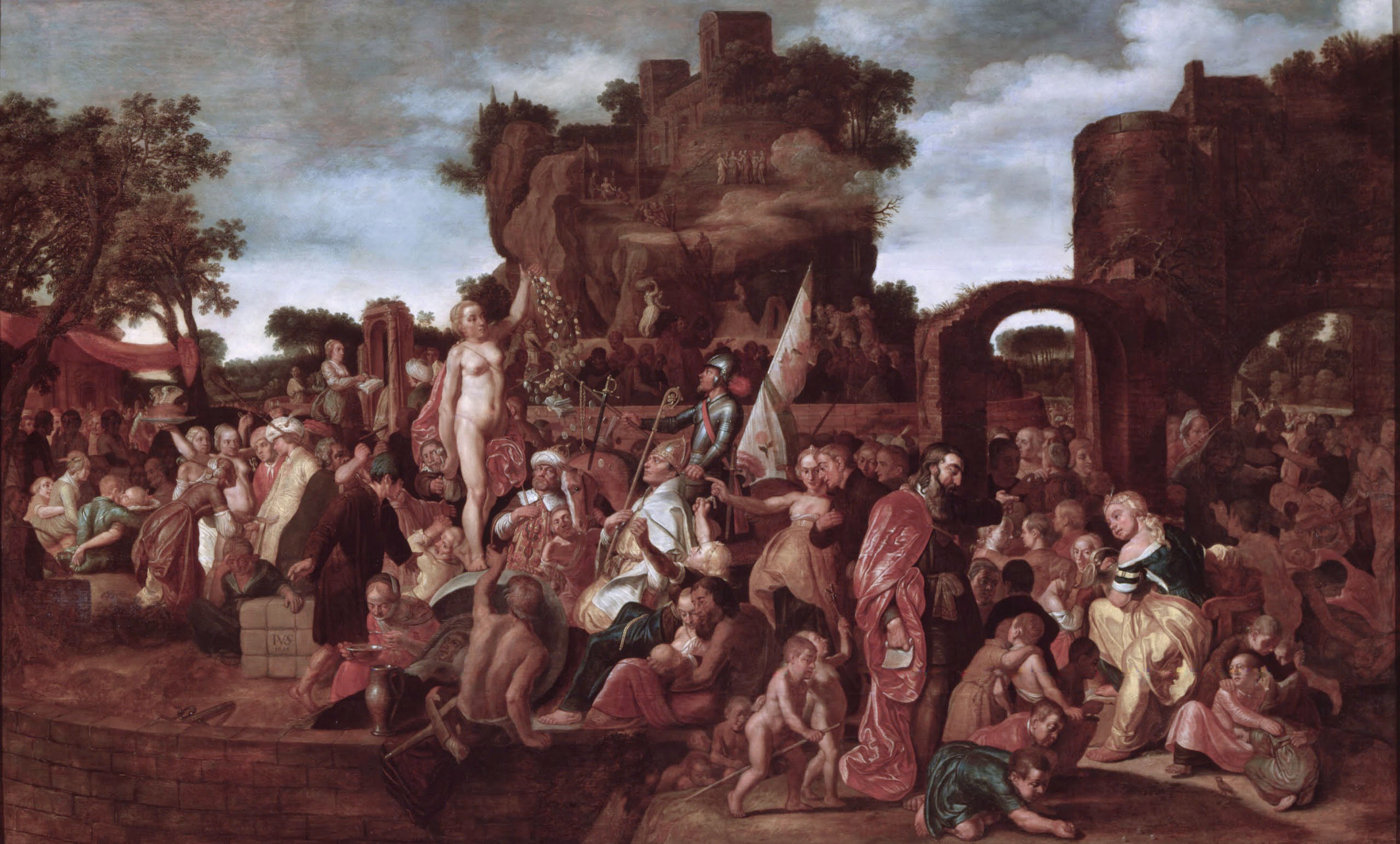
Allegory of the foolishness of Man, 1607

According to Houbraken he was born in Leiden with a talent for drawing, and his teachers were upset that he drew animals on everything he was given. At 17 he was apprenticed to Coenraad van der Maas, a good portrait painter, for 3 years, in which short amount of time he became good enough to start out on his own. In Delft he was strongly influenced by the school of Michiel Jansz van Mierevelt. After he had learned enough to start his own workshop, he decided to travel to Italy, but his parents married him to Marijtgen Bouwens van Leeuwen, so he cut off his travel plans and returned to Leiden. He was a successful painter who was respected in the community. He joined the Leiden Guild of St. Luke and was one of a group who sent a petition to the city fathers in 1609 for a new, more protective charter for the guild. It was rejected and they attempted this again in 1610 and it was again rejected.

He won lucrative portrait commissions from the Leiden schutterij in 1626 and painted a historical piece for the city hall of Leiden where the mayor van der Werff offers his sword to the hungry people of Leiden with the speech; If it will help you, cut my body into pieces and distribute this among you - this will comfort me. He also won a commission from the Lutheran Church in 1640 for a series of paintings on the life of man.

According to the RKD, he was son of a Flemish immigrant in Leiden who was registered as the pupil of Evert van der Maes in The Hague in 1604 for three years, and he married Marijtgen who was from Oegstgeest on May 17, 1617, in Leiden. He was the teacher, not the pupil, of Coenraed van der Maes van Avenrode (probably a family member of Evert), and also the teacher of the painters Jan Lievens and Abraham van den Tempel. According to Simon van Leeuwen he was also the teacher of Rembrandt.

== Legacy ==
His paintings in the Lutheran church and the city hall of Leiden still hang where they were installed. He was the teacher of Rembrandt, Jan Lievens, and Abraham van den Tempel.

It is unknown whether he was related to his contemporary with the same last name, the Amsterdam-born still life painter Floris van Schooten.
