= Karel van Mander the Younger =

Dutch Golden Age painter

Karel van Mander the Younger (1579–1623) was a Dutch Golden Age painter and the son of Karel van Mander.

== Biography ==
The younger van Mander was born in Kortrijk. According to Houbraken, he learned to paint from his father and became a good portrait painter. He moved to Copenhagen where he was court painter to the King. His portrait of Frederik III was honored with a poem by Joost van den Vondel.

According to the RKD he became a member of the Delft Guild of St. Luke in 1613. He designed a series of tapestries for Christian IV of Denmark and lived for a period both in Copenhagen and Delft, where he died. He was the teacher of Joris van Lier and Karel van Mander III. It was his son who became court painter to Christian IV.
