= Heemskerk railway station =

Railway station in the Netherlands

Heemskerk
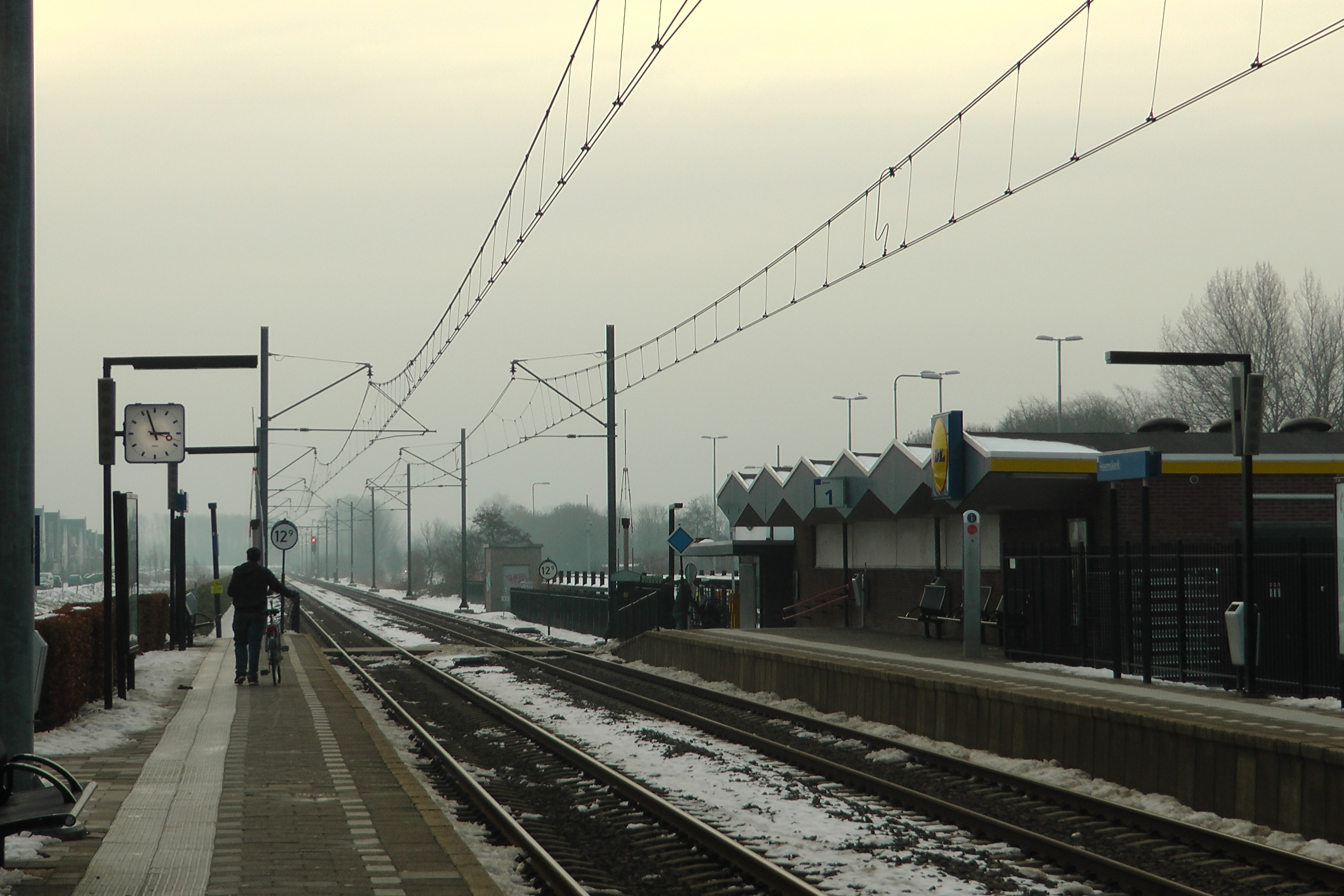

General information
- Location: Netherlands
- Coordinates: 52°29′41″N 4°41′10″E
- Line: Haarlem–Uitgeest railway

History
- Opened: 1 June 1969

Services
Preceding station	Nederlandse Spoorwegen	Following station
Uitgeest towards Hoorn	NS Sprinter 4800	Beverwijk towards Amsterdam Centraal
Location
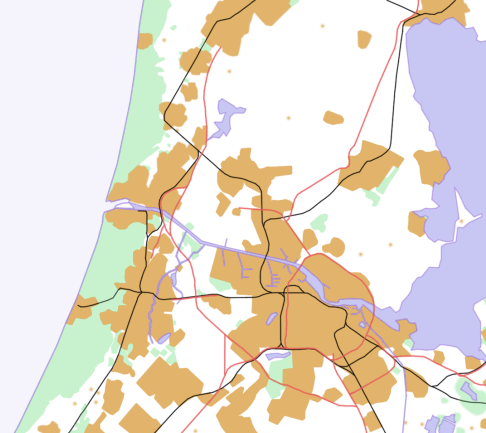
- Location within Northern Randstad Location within Netherlands

Heemskerk railway station is located in Heemskerk, Netherlands. The station opened 1 June 1969 on the Haarlem–Uitgeest railway. The station has 2 platforms.

== Train services ==
As of 11 December 2016, the following services call at Heemskerk:

- 2× per hour local service (sprinter) Hoorn - Alkmaar - Uitgeest - Haarlem - Amsterdam
