= Marquette-en-Ostrevant =

- Commune
- The church in Marquette-en-Ostrevant

- Coat of arms
- Location of Marquette-en-Ostrevant
- Location within France Location within Hauts-de-France
- Coordinates: 50°17′18″N 3°16′09″E
- Country: France
- Region: Hauts-de-France
- Department: Nord
- Arrondissement: Valenciennes
- Canton: Denain
- Intercommunality: CA Porte du Hainaut

Government
  - Mayor (2020–2026): Jean-Marie Tondeur
- Area^{1}: 7.47 km^{2} (2.88 sq mi)
- Elevation: 50 m (160 ft)
- Highest elevation: 69 m (226 ft)
- Lowest elevation: 33 m (108 ft)
- Population (2023): 1,943
  - Density: 260/km^{2} (674/sq mi)
- Time zone: UTC+01:00 (CET)
  - Summer (DST): UTC+02:00 (CEST)
- INSEE/Postal code: 59387 /59252
- ^{1} French Land Register data, which excludes lakes, ponds, glaciers > 1 km^{2} (0.386 sq mi or 247 acres) and river estuaries.

Marquette-en-Ostrevant is a commune in the Nord department in northern France.

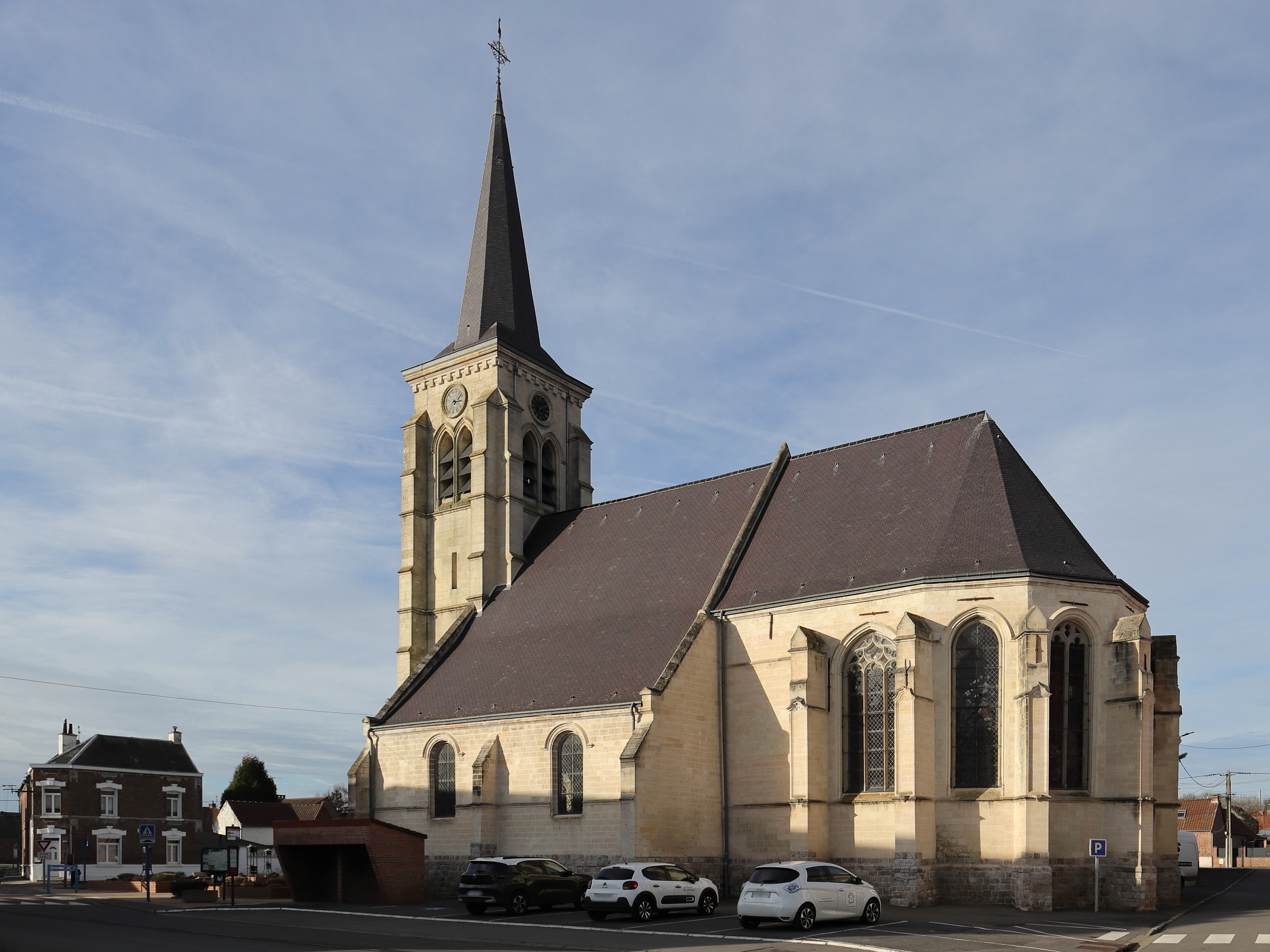
Saint Martin Church

The choir of the church, classified as a historical monument

The 17th-century Eucharistic tower

== Heraldry ==
Arms of Marquette-en-Ostrevant	The arms of Marquette-en-Ostrevant are blazoned : Azure billetty, a crescent argent.

== See also ==
- Communes of the Nord department
