= Heemskerk =

Municipality in the Netherlands

- Municipality
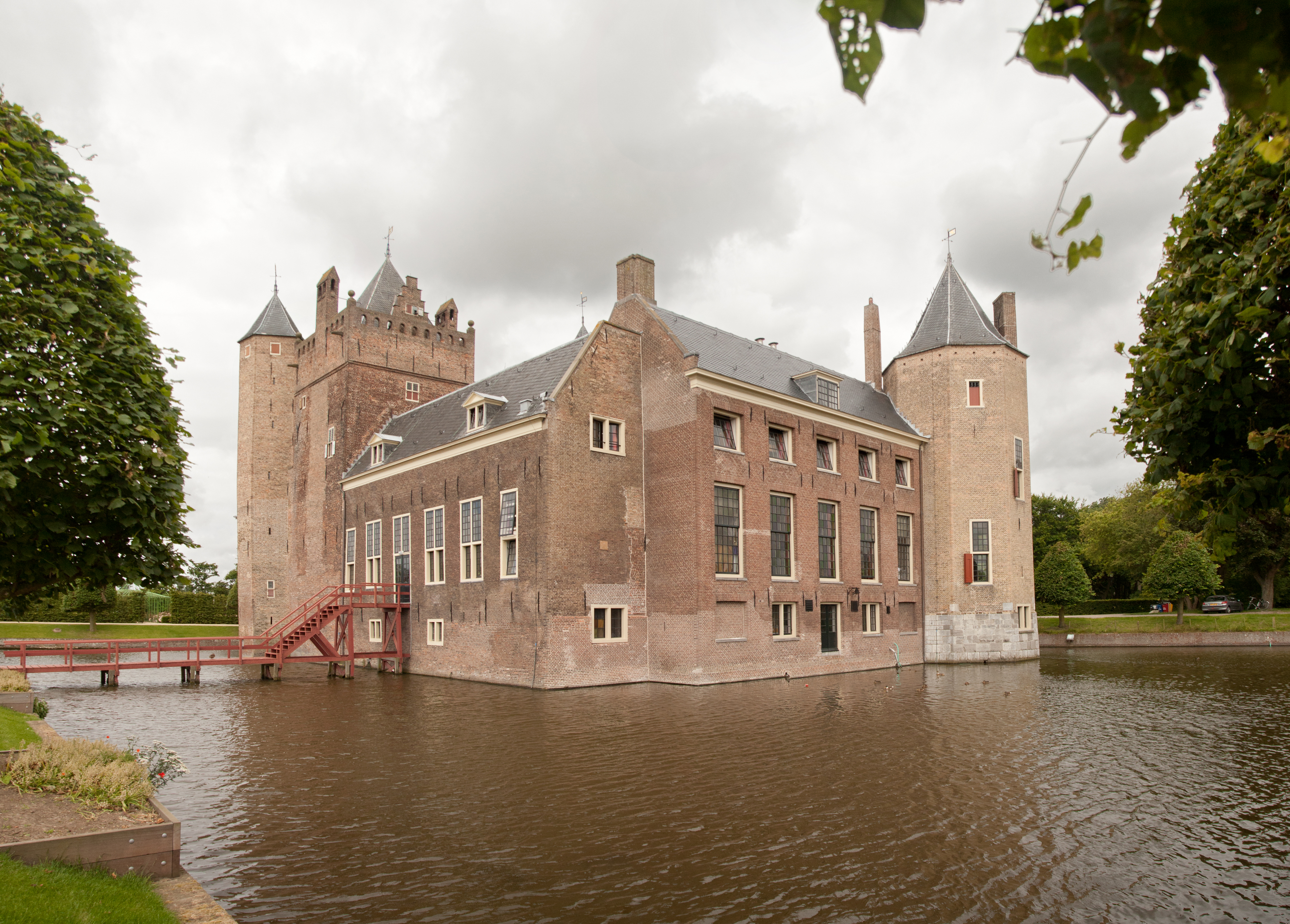
- Assumburg castle in Heemskerk

- Flag Coat of arms

- Location in North Holland
- Coordinates: 52°31′N 4°40′E
- Country: Netherlands
- Province: North Holland
- Region: Amsterdam metropolitan area

Government
  - Body: Municipal council
  - Mayor: A.H.J.J. Luijten (VVD)

Area
  - Total: 31.68 km^{2} (12.23 sq mi)
  - Land: 27.34 km^{2} (10.56 sq mi)
  - Water: 4.34 km^{2} (1.68 sq mi)
- Elevation: 2 m (6.6 ft)

Population (January 2021)
  - Total: 39,191
  - Density: 1,433/km^{2} (3,710/sq mi)
- Demonym: Heemskerker
- Time zone: UTC+1 (CET)
  - Summer (DST): UTC+2 (CEST)
- Postcode: 1960–1969
- Area code: 0251
- Website: www.heemskerk.nl

Heemskerk (Dutch pronunciation: [ˈɦeːmskɛr(ə)k] or [ɦeːmsˈkɛr(ə)k]) is a municipality and a town in the Netherlands, in the province of North Holland. It is located in the Kennemerland region.

== History ==
The town was formed during the Middle Ages. In an official deed from the year of 1063, the town was known as Hemezen Kyrica, Latinized Frisian meaning Church of Hemezen, a Frisian nun who lived in a religious house there. Heemskerk knows many historical monuments, among them the Huldtoneel (lit. the "Inaugurate Stage"), an artificial hill located near the current Rijksstraatweg, where once the Counts of Holland were inaugurated. According to tradition, the Huldtoneel was used before the Roman Era as a Germanic sanctuary. In the nineteenth century Jonkheer Gevers finally made the Huldtoneel a monument – as it is known today – and ordered passers-by to honour the monument.

Many battles have been fought in Heemskerk. Two castles—Oud Haerlem Castle and Heemskerk Castle—were built in the twelfth and thirteenth century respectively to protect the County of Holland against the West Frisians. In the fifteenth century the residents of Heemskerk fought each other during the Hook and Cod wars, in which both castles were destroyed. The Oud Haerlem castle was never rebuilt, Castle Heemskerk however was. In 1492, a rebellion by the people of Kennemerland was brutally beaten down by the Austrian conquerors, on the place where today the cemetery of the Hervormde Kerk (Reformed Church) is located.

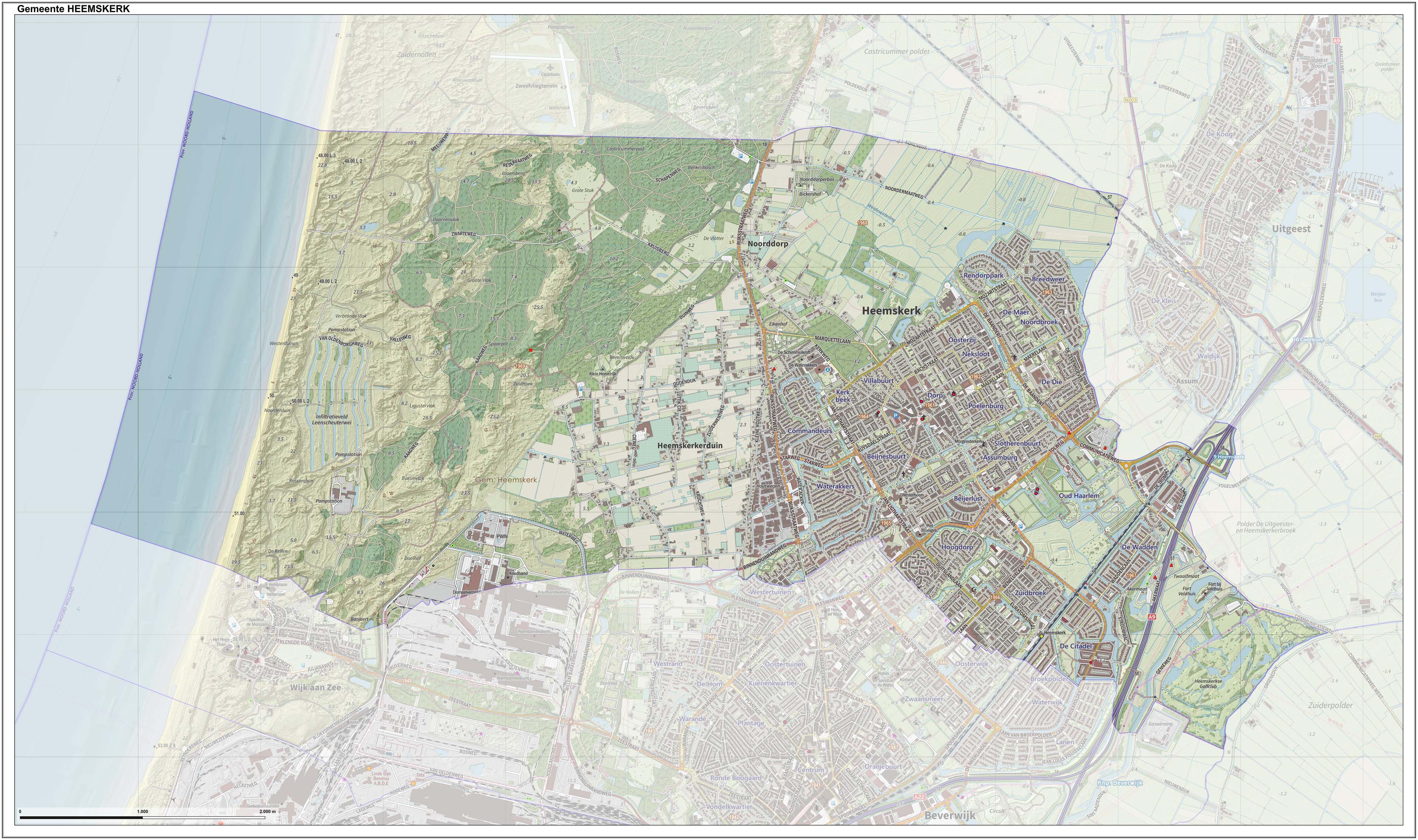
Map of Heemskerk, June 2015

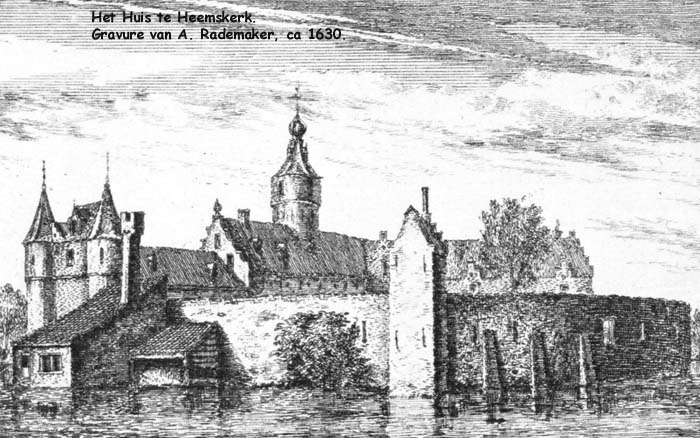
Castle Heemskerk circa 1630.

In 1610, the Castle Heemskerk was renamed to Castle Marquette and was at first the residence for many nobles and later inhabited by patricians. The last noble family that lived there were the House of Gevers. Today Castle Marquette is owned by the Spanish hotelgroup NH Hotels and is a venue for weddings and conferences.

Located on the eastside of Heemskerk is Castle Assumburg, built from the remains of Kasteel Oud Haerlem in 1546. The Nederlandse Hervormde Kerk (Dutch Reformed Church) at the Nielenplein and Kerkplein is built in 1628, but it has a tower from the Middle Ages. In the graveyard around the church is a copy of a monument dedicated to the father of painter Maarten van Heemskerck. The original is located inside the church.

=== Agricultural village ===
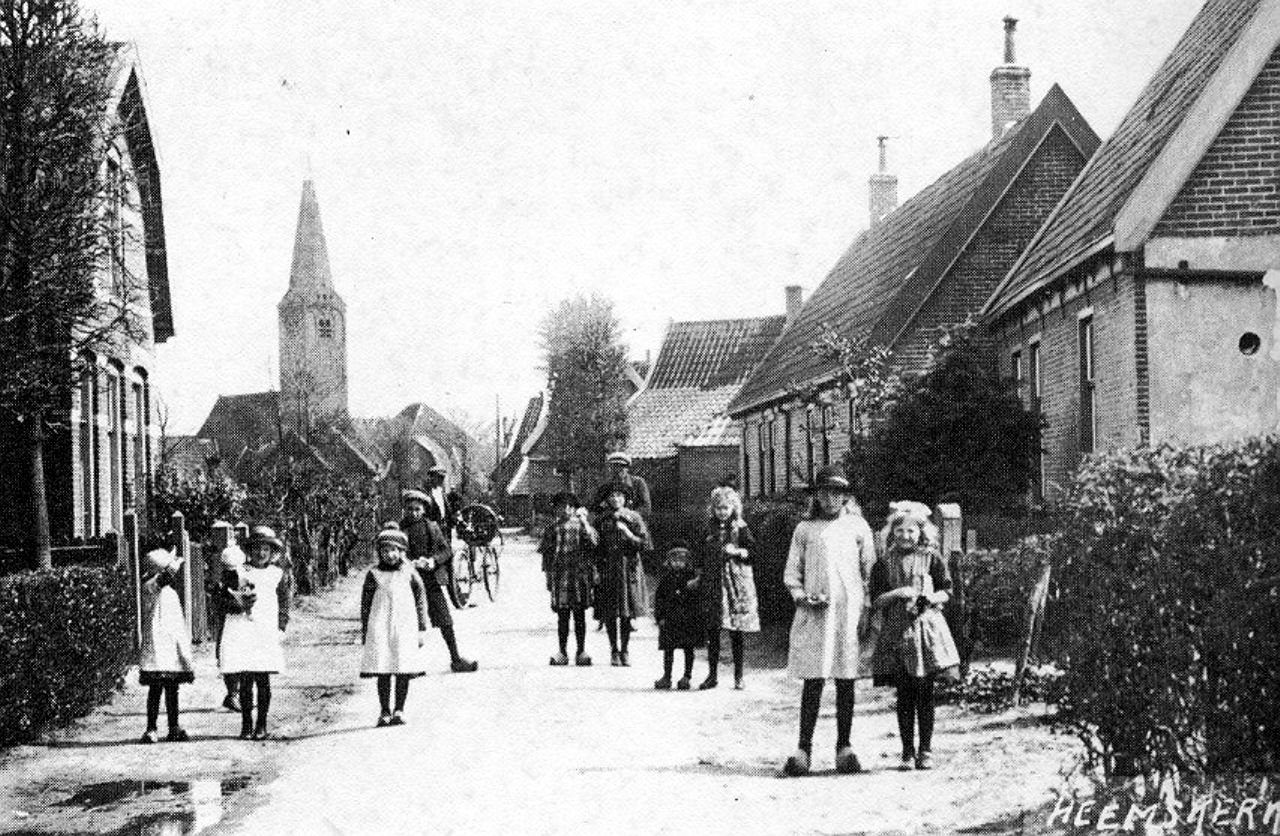
The old village around 1915-30.

After the time of knights and nobles, Heemskerk remained a small, quiet village near the dunes, its residents working mainly in agriculture and keeping cattle. From the time that products—mainly strawberries for the neighbouring town of Beverwijk—were brought to market by donkey, people from Heemskerk were nicknamed 'donkeys'.

The former town hall was built in 1911 after a design by Jan Stuyt and had an additional floor added in 1949. Today it is the office of a firm of notaries. The Roman Catholic Laurentiuskerk, designed by architect J. H. Tonnaer, was completed in 1891 and is a rare example of a Catholic church in Holland in a neo-renaissance style. There is nothing left of other historical monuments, like Castle Oud Haerlem.

== Transportation ==
- Railway Station: Heemskerk

== Notable residents ==
- André Aptroot (born 1961), mycologist and lichenologist
- Sofie van den Enk (born 1980), TV presente
- Bette Franke (born 1989), model
- Maarten van Heemskerck (1498–1574), portrait and religious painter
- Rolf de Heer (born 1951), Dutch-Australian film director
- Nicholaas Hennemann (1813–1898), photographer
- Nico Roozen (born 1953), economist

=== Sportspeople ===
- Martin van der Horst (born 1965), volleyball player
- Ernesto Hoost (born 1965), kickboxer
- Sepp Koster (born 1974), racing driver
- Nick Kuipers (born 1988), footballer
- Dennis Lens (born 1977), badminton player
- Jos Niesten (born 1945), marathon speed skater
- Arthur Numan (born 1969), footballer
- Rafael van der Vaart (born 1983), footballer and darts player
- Juan Viedma (born 1974), footballer

== Gallery ==
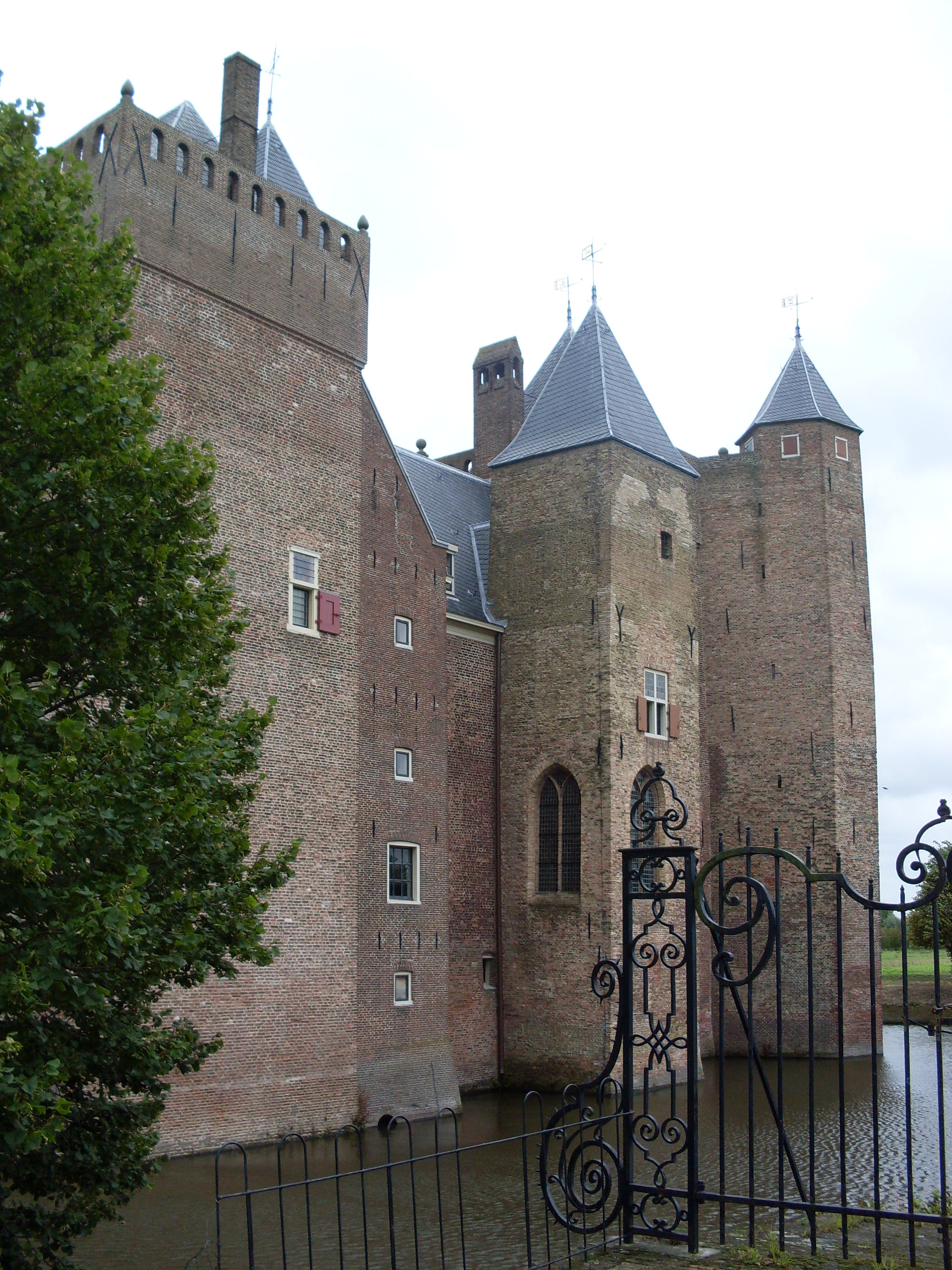
Kasteel Assumburg

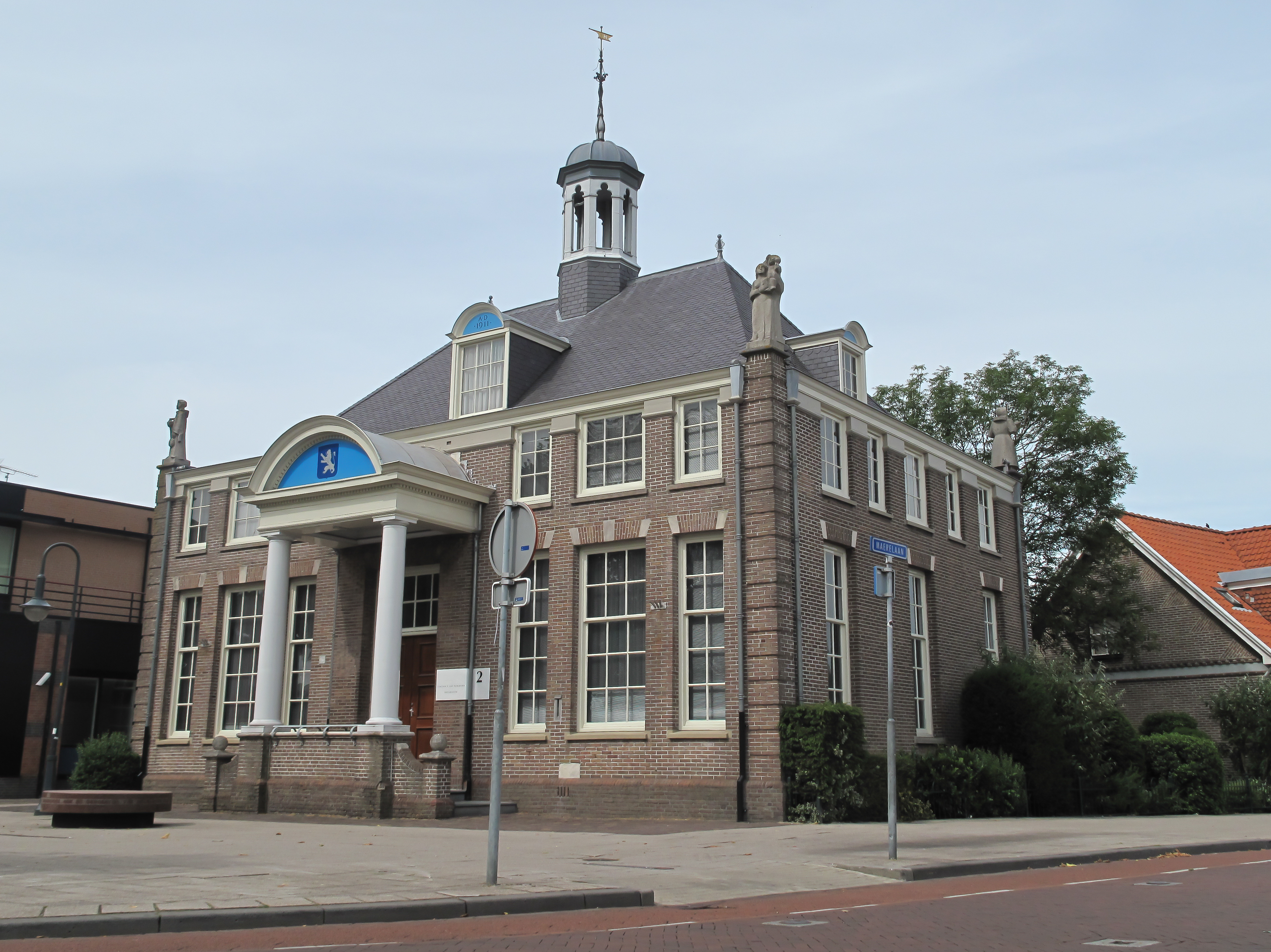
Heemskerk, former town hall at the Burg. Nielenplein

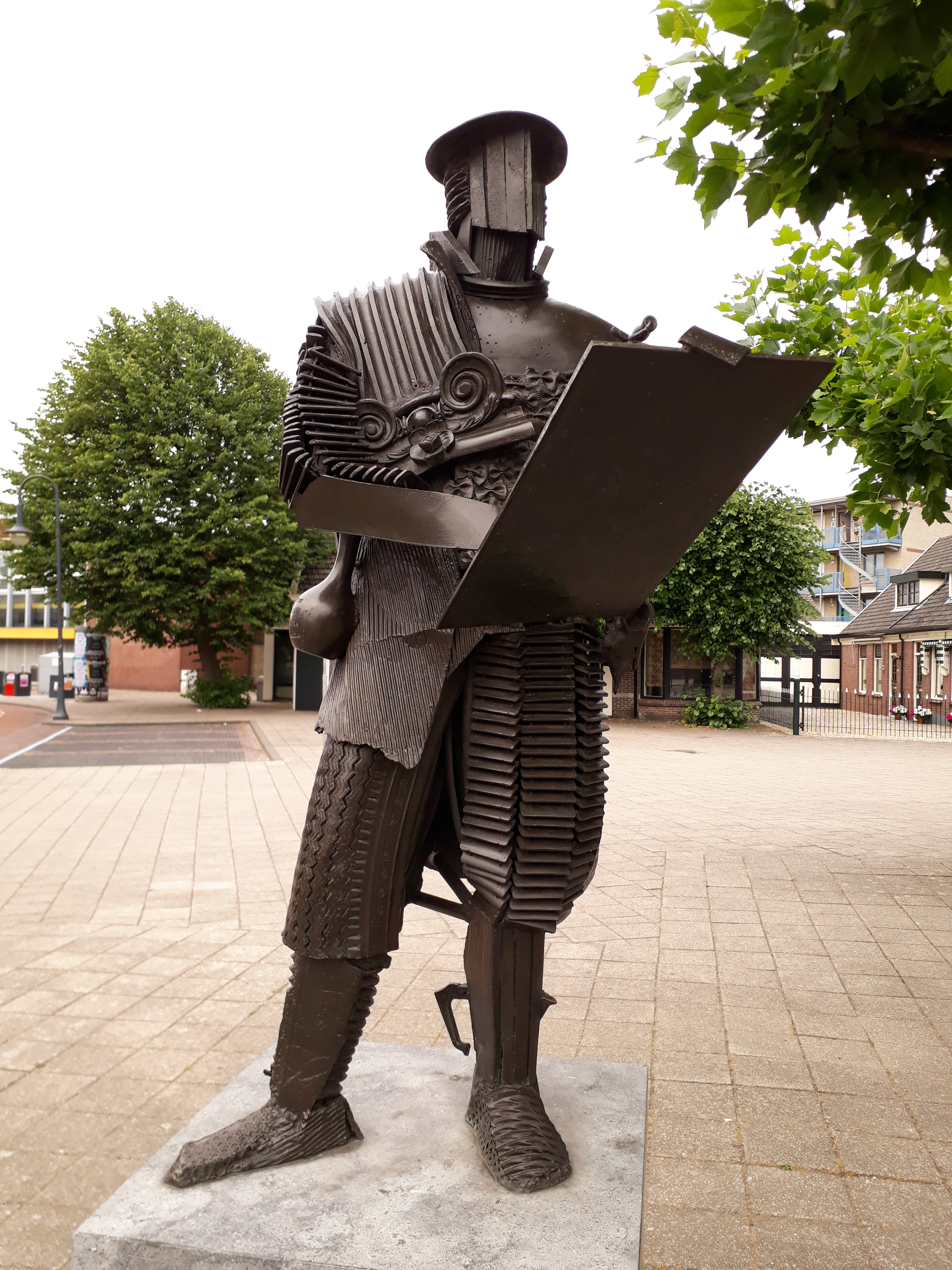
Maerten van Heemskerck Statue

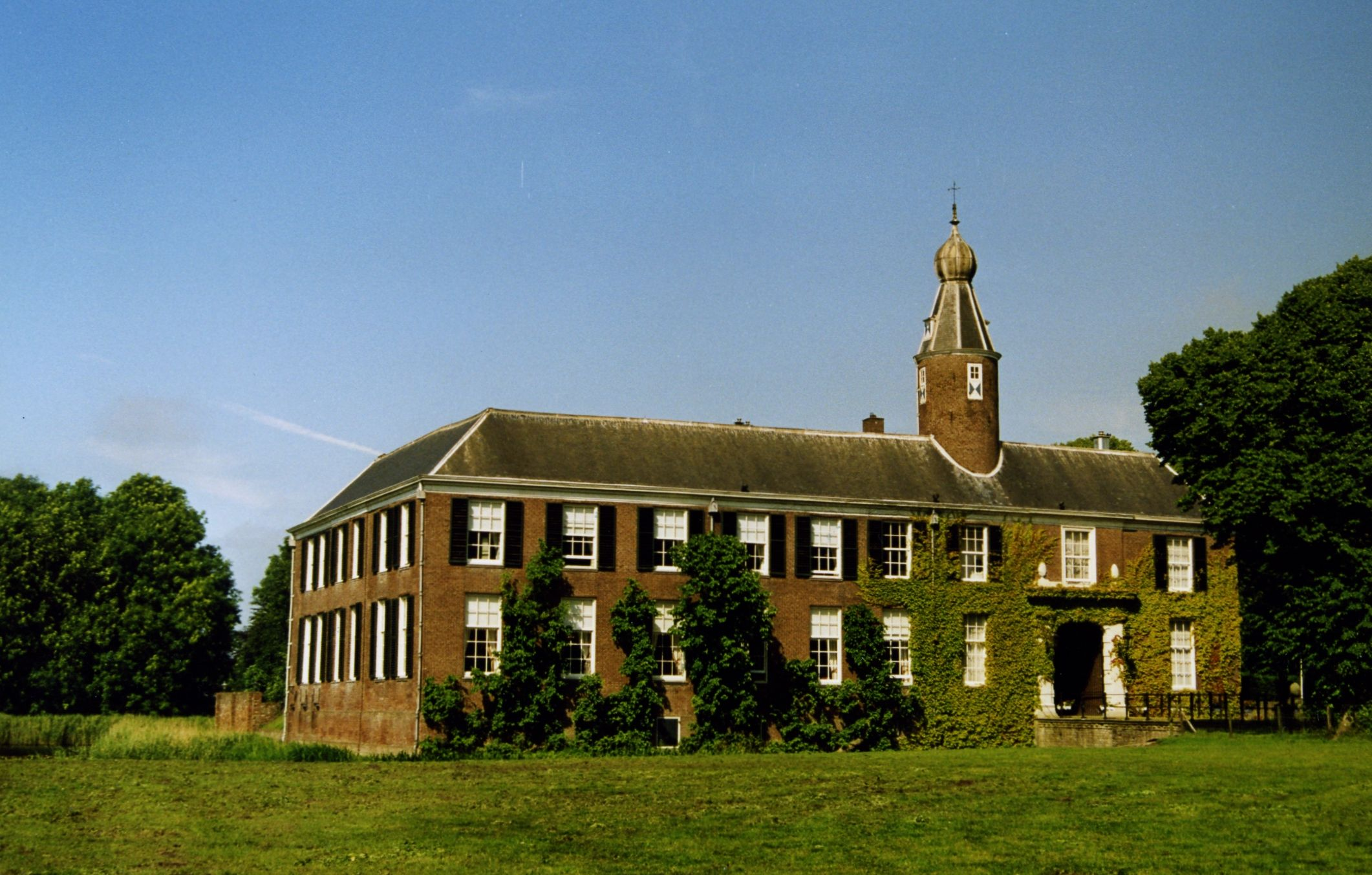
Kasteel Marquette

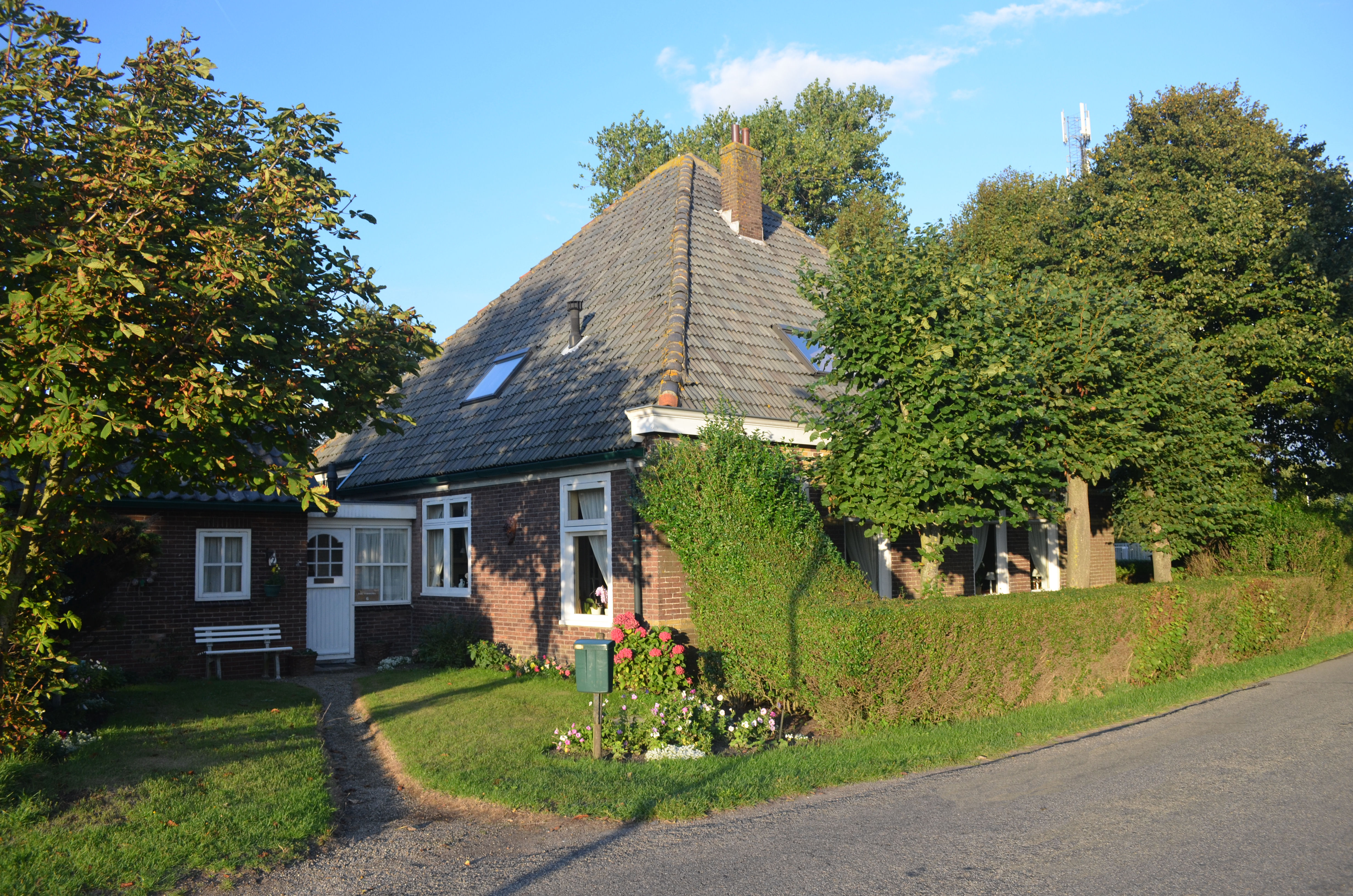
GM-Oosterweg-6-Heemskerk
