= Van der Heck =

Van der Heck is a Dutch surname. Notable people with the surname include:

- Claes Dirksz van der Heck (1595–1649), Dutch painter
- Claes Jacobsz van der Heck (1575–1652), Dutch painter
- Marten Heemskerck van der Heck (1620–1660), Dutch painter
