= Heck (surname) =

Heck is a surname. Notable people with the surname include:

- Albert J. R. Heck (born 1964), Dutch chemist
- Alfons Heck (1928–2005), German-American human rights activist
- Andy Heck (born 1967), American football player and coach
- Bruno Heck (1917–1989), German politician, confidant of Konrad Adenauer
- Charlie Heck (born 1996), American football player; son of Andy
- Denny Heck (born 1952), American politician and Congressman
- Dieter Thomas Heck (1937–2018), German television presenter
- Don Heck (1929–1995), American comic book artist
- Heinz Heck (1894–1982), German zoo director
- Homer Heck (1936–2014), American politician
- Joe Heck, American politician
- Ludwig Heck (1860–1951), German zoo director, father of Heinz and Lutz Heck
- Lutz Heck (1892–1983), German zoo director
- Max W. Heck (1869–1938), American politician
- Paul Heck (born 1967), American music producer
- Peter Heck (born 1941), American science fiction author
- Ralph Heck (1941–2025), American football player
- Richard F. Heck (1931–2015), American chemist
- Rose Marie Heck (1932–2026), American politician
- Victor Heck (born 1967), American editor and horror fiction author
- Walter Heck, German graphic designer, member of the Nazi SA and SS

== Fictional characters ==
- The Hecks, family from the fictional Orson, Indiana in The Middle TV series.

== See also ==
- Senator Heck (disambiguation)
- Van der Heck
- Hecke (surname)
- Hecht (surname)
