= Hecke (surname) =

Hecke is a German surname. Notable people with the surname include:

- Dietrich Hecke (born 1935), German fencer
- Erich Hecke (1887–1947), German mathematician
- Roswitha Hecke (born 1944), German photographer and photojournalist

== See also ==
- Heck (surname)
