= Claes Dirksz van der Heck =

Dutch Golden Age landscape painter

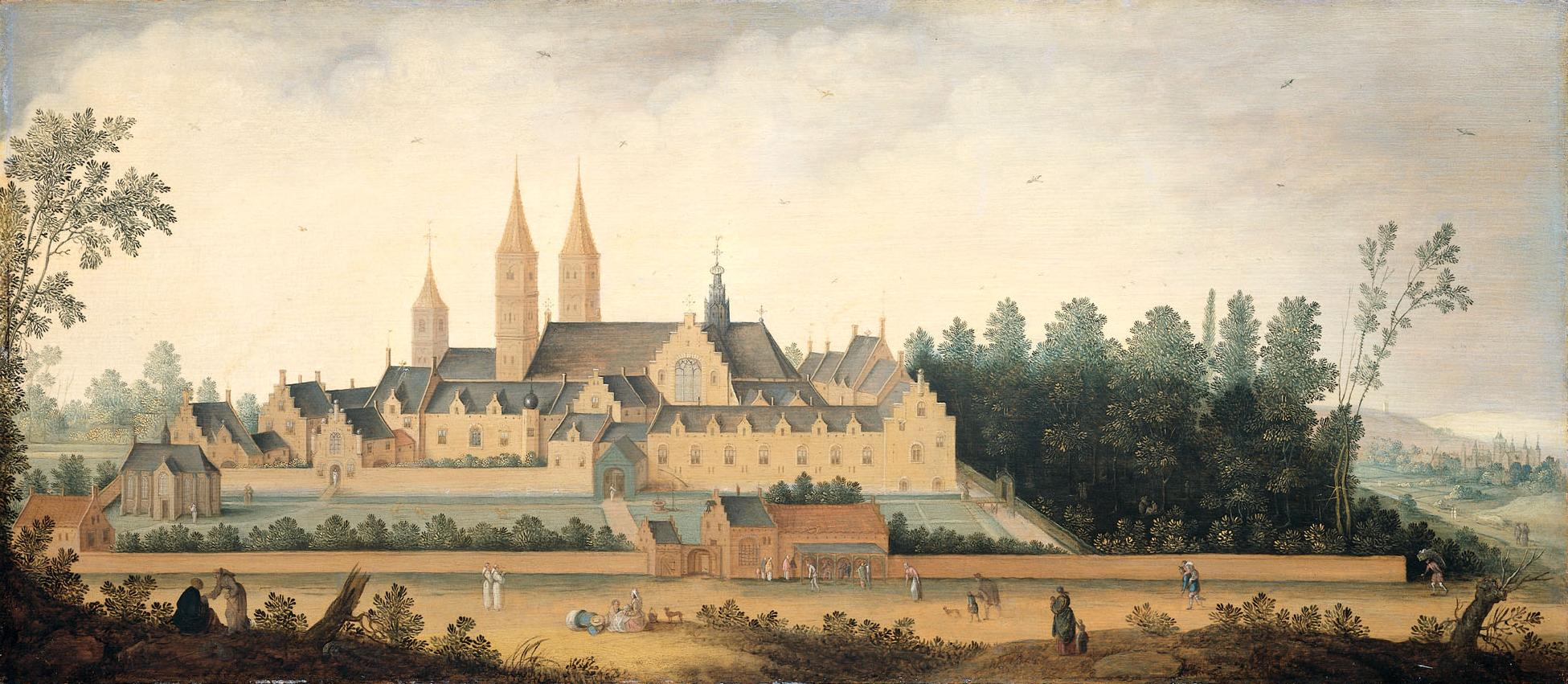
A view of Egmond Abbey

Claes Dircksz van der Heck (1595, Alkmaar – 1649, Alkmaar), was a Dutch Golden Age landscape painter.

== Biography ==
According to the RKD he became a member of the Alkmaar Guild of Saint Luke in 1635, after his cousin Claes Jacobsz van der Heck helped set it up in 1632. He was the father of the painter Marten Heemskerk van der Hek, who he named after his famous great-uncle, Maarten van Heemskerck.

His cousin made similar landscapes and they probably worked in the same workshop. According to Hessel Miedema's notes on the Alkmaar van der Heck family in his translation of Karel van Mander's Schilder-boeck, "Jacques van der Heck" (or Jacob Dircksz) was a son of Maarten van Heemskerck's sister Neeltje and her husband Dirk van der Heck. Jacques' son "Niclaes" was Claes Jacobsz van der Heck. Heemskerck had disinherited "another nephew" (presumably a Dirk Dirksz, the later father of Claes Dircksz van der Heck), and left a portion in his will to Jacob Dircksz.
