= Schilder-boeck =

Book by Karel van Mander

Het Schilder-boeck
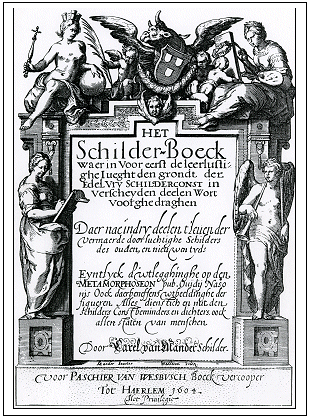
- Author: Karel van Mander
- Original title: Het Schilder-Boeck Waer in haer ghestalt, aerdt ende wesen, de leer-lustighe Jeught in verscheyden Deelen in Rijm-dicht wort voor ghedraghen; Daer nae in dry delen 't leven der vermaerde doorluchtighe Schilders des ouden, en nieuwen tyd: Eyntlyck d'wtlegghinhe op den METAMORPHOSEON Pub. Ouidij Nasonis; Oock daer beneffens wtbeeldinghe der figuren. Alles dienstich en nut den schilders Const beminders en dichters. Oock alle staten van menschen.
- Translator: Hessel Miedema (to modern Dutch and to English)
- Illustrator: Original edition had only a few plates
- Language: Dutch
- Subject: Artist biographies
- Genre: Art history, Biography, Art theory, Art education
- Publisher: First edition: Passchier Wesbusch, Haarlem Second edition: Jacob Pietersz Wachter, Amsterdam
- Publication date: First edition: 1604 Second edition: 1618
- Publication place: Dutch Republic
- English publication date: 1994-1997 (translation)
- Media type: Print (Hardcover), Online version of original text available from the DBNL
- ISBN: 90-70288-85-0 , ISBN 90-70288-91-5, ISBN 90-70288-92-3, ISBN 90-70288-93-1, ISBN 90-70288-94-X, ISBN 90-70288-95-8

Het Schilder-Boeck or Schilderboek is a book written by the Flemish writer and painter Karel van Mander first published in 1604 in Haarlem in the Dutch Republic, where van Mander resided. The book is written in 17th-century Dutch and its title is commonly translated into English as 'The Book of Painters' or 'The Book of (or on) Painting' and sometimes as 'The Book on Picturing'. Het Schilder-Boeck consists of six parts and is considered one of the principal sources on the history of art and art theory in the 15th and 16th century Low Countries. The book was very well received and sold well. Karel van Mander died two years after its publication. A second posthumous edition, which included a brief, anonymous biography of van Mander was published in 1618. This second edition was translated by Hessel Miedema into English and published in 1994-1997 together with a facsimile of the original and five volumes of notes on the text.

== Summary ==
Het Schilder-Boeck is divided into six parts that have separate title pages and are indexed. The parts are:

- The foundations of the noble and free art of painting (Den Grondt der Edel vry Schilder-const: Waer in haer ghestalt, aerdt ende wesen, de leer-lustighe Jeught in verscheyden Deelen in Rijm-dicht wort voor ghedraghen.)
- Lives of the illustrious ancient painters including Egyptians, Greek and Romans (Het Leven Der oude Antijcke doorluchtighe Schilders, soo wel Egyptenaren, Griecken als Romeynen)
- Lives of the modern or contemporary illustrious Italian painters (Het Leven Der Moderne, oft dees-tijtsche doorluchtighe Italiaensche Schilders.)
- Lives of the illustrious Netherlandish and German painters (Het Leven der Doorluchtighe Nederlandtsche, en Hooghduytsche Schilders.)
- Commentary on the Metamorphoses of Publius Ovidius Nasso (Wtlegghingh op den Metamorphosis Pub. Ouidij Nasonis.)
- Depiction of figures (Uvtbeeldinge der Figueren)

== Historiographic background ==
The history of early Netherlandish painting was first described by the Italian Lodovico Guicciardini in his Descrittione di Lodovico Guicciardini patritio fiorentino di tutti i Paesi Bassi altrimenti detti Germania inferiore (1567; The Description of the Low Countries). This book formed a source for Giorgio Vasari's famous biographical accounts of painters in his book Lives of the Most Excellent Painters, Sculptors, and Architects, often referred to as the Vite. That tradition took little account of the geographic topology of the Low Countries and the van Eyck brothers were considered the fathers of Netherlandish painting concentrated in Bruges. Karel van Mander intended to correct this misconception by listing all the famous early Netherlandish painters. He encountered many difficulties in obtaining accurate information, due to the political and religious unrest at the time.

The biographies in the Schilder-Boeck are similar in style and format to Vasari's Vite. Karel van Mander digresses only rarely from the format: starting per painter with an overview of the childhood years and a list of teachers, followed by some career information and concluding with a list of notable works. The second edition includes a biography of van Mander himself that Miedema believes was written by his brother, who may have been with him on his deathbed. Other candidates have been proposed as authors of the biography. Recently his son Karel van Mander the Younger was identified as a possible author. His son would have relied on biographical information that Karel van Mander had written himself as well as on his own recollections and notes. The information in the biographical sketch is not entirely reliable but is still regarded as the best source of information on van Mander's life.

Dominicus Lampsonius was an important source for Karel van Mander, through both his letters to Vasari and his publication ''Pictorum aliquot celebrium Germaniae Inferioris effigies'', a work he published together with Hieronymus Cock in 1572.

Van Mander was writing in a country where Calvinists were powerful and religious art was regarded with suspicion. The market for religious subjects was quickly replaced in favor of genre scenes and historical allegories. It became fashionable to choose politically correct subjects such as stories too old to be offensive to either Protestants or Catholics. The city of Haarlem needed to reinvent itself after losing its attraction as a pilgrimage site for St. Bavo. Its leaders commissioned paintings depicting the city's glorious past, such as in the story of the crusade against Damietta, which was the basis for the Coat of arms of Haarlem. Artists and writers helped update the local source of inspiration for art. Van Mander contributed to this effort by supplying a list of biographies of ancient painters in Lives of Ancient Egyptian, Greek and Roman painters and his commentaries on Ovid's Metamorphoses and the depiction of figures.

== The six parts of the Schilder-Boeck ==
=== The foundations of the noble and free art of painting ===
The book begins with a book on the "foundation" of the art of paintings. This introductory book has fourteen chapters on art theory listing such subjects as landscapes, animals, drapery, and arrangements of subjects.

=== Lives of the illustrious ancient painters including Egyptians, Greek and Roman ===
Het Schilder-boek's biographies of ancient painters is almost entirely based on Pliny's Naturalis Historia and offers no new material.

==== Van Mander's list of ancient Greek painters ====
- Agatharchus
- Androcydes
- Antiphilus
- Apelles
- Apollodorus
- Aristides of Thebes
- Cimon of Cleonae
- Echion
- Euphranor
- Eupompus
- Melanthius
- Nicomachus of Thebes
- Pamphilus of Amphipolis
- Panaenus
- Parrhasius
- Pausias
- Polyeidos
- Polygnotus
- Protogenes
- Theon of Samos
- Timarete
- Timomachus
- Zeuxis

=== Lives of the modern or contemporary illustrious Italian painters ===
Van Mander based this part of the Schilder-Boeck on Vasari's Vite. The Vite had been published half a century earlier. For this reason he only translated about half of Vasari's biographical sketches, and he added Italian artists from his years in Italy, such as Tintoretto who became known after Vasari's work was published. Van Mander also purposefully editorialized Vasari's biographies by reinterpreting some of Vasari's material and by adding to Vasari's text with a view to updating it. What follows is a list of Vasari sketches that van Mander translated and included in his work:

- Cimabue
- Andrea Tafi
- Gaddo Gaddi
- Margaritone
- Giotto, with Puccio Capanna
- Stefano di Giovanni and Ugolino di Nerio
- Pietro Lorenzetti (Pietro Laurati)
- Buonamico Buffalmacco
- Ambrogio Lorenzetti (Ambruogio Laurati)
- Pietro Cavallini
- Simone Martini with Lippo Memmi
- Taddeo Gaddi
- Andrea Orcagna (Andrea di Cione)
- Tommaso Fiorentino
- Lippo
- Masaccio
- Leon Battista Alberti
- Antonello da Messina
- Domenico Ghirlandaio
- Antonio del Pollaiuolo
- Sandro Botticelli
- Andrea del Verrocchio
- Andrea Mantegna
- Filippino Lippi
- Francesco Francia
- Pietro Perugino
- Luca Signorelli
- Leonardo da Vinci
- Giorgione da Castelfranco
- Antonio da Correggio
- Raffaellino del Garbo
- Baldassare Peruzzi
- Pellegrino da Modena (Pellegrino Aretusi)
- Andrea del Sarto
- Giovanni Antonio Licino
- Polidoro da Caravaggio and Maturino da Firenze (Maturino Fiorentino)
- Bartolommeo Ramenghi (Bartolomeo Da Bagnacavallo)
- Franciabigio
- Francesco Mazzola
- Jacopo Palma (Il Palma)
- Lorenzo Lotto
- Giulio Romano
- Sebastiano del Piombo (Sebastiano Viniziano)
- Perino Del Vaga
- Giovann'Antonio Lappoli
- Baccio Bandinelli
- Jacopo da Pontormo
- Giovanni da Udine
- Francesco Rustichi
- Francesco detto de' Salviati
- Daniello Ricciarelli da Volterra
- Taddeo Zucchero
- Michelangelo Buonarroti (Michelangelo)
- Francesco Primaticcio
- Tiziano da Cadore (Titian)
- Tintoretto
- Paulo Caliary, student of Giovanni Francesco Caroto
- Jacopo Bassano
- Giorgio Vasari
- Frederick Zucchero
- Frederick Barozio
- Lorenzo Lotto
- Giuseppe Cesari
- Other Italian painters worthy of mention; Annibale Carracci (Caratz), Michael Agnolo van Caravaggio
- List of painters he knew during his time in Italy, and afterwards; Girolamo Siciolante da Sermoneta, Antonio Tempesta, Ventura Salimbeni, Marco Pino, Andrea Boscoli

=== Lives of the illustrious Netherlandish and German painters ===
Van Mander is less known for his translated work on Italian art than he is for his biographical sketches of Netherlandish painters. What follows is the list of already famous painters from the low countries discussed in the book.

- Jan and Hubert van Eyck
- Rogier van Brugghe
- Hugo van der Goes
- Albert van Ouwater and Albert Simonsz
- Geertgen tot Sint Jans
- Dirk Bouts
- Rogier van der Weyden
- Jacob Cornelisz van Oostsanen
- Albrecht Dürer
- Cornelis Engelbrechtsz
- Bernard van Orley
- Lucas van Leyden
- Ian den Hollander
- Quentin Matsys
- Hieronymus Bosch
- Cornelis Cornelisz Kunst
- Lucas Cornelisz de Kock
- Jan Joest van Calcar
- Pieter van Aelst
- Joachim Patinir
- Herri met de Bles
- Lucas Gassel van Helmont
- Lambert Lombard
- Hans Holbein the Younger
- Jan Cornelisz Vermeyen
- Jan Mabuse
- Augustijn Ioorisz
- Joos van Cleve
- Aldegraef
- Swart Jan
- Frans Minnebroer with Frans Verbeeck, Vincent Geldersman, Hans Hoogenbergh, Frans Crabbe, Claes Roegier, Hans Kaynoot den dooven, Cornelis Enghelrams, Marcus Willems, and Iaques de Poindre, and Gregorius Beerings
- Jan Mostaert
- Adriaen de Weerdt
- Hendrick and Marten van Cleef
- Anthonis Mor
- Jacob de Backer
- Matthys Cock and Hieronymus Cock
- Willem Key
- Pieter Brueghel the Elder
- Jan van Scorel
- Aertgen van Leyden
- Joachim Beuckelaer
- Frans Floris
- Pieter Aertsen
- Maarten van Heemskerck
- Richard Aertsz
- Hubert Goltz
- Pieter Vlerick van Cortrijck and Carel van Yper
- Anthonie van Montfoort
- Lucas de Heere
- Jacques Grimmaer
- Cornelis Molenaer
- Pieter Balten
- Joos van Liere
- Pieter Pourbus and Frans Pourbus the Elder with Frans Pourbus the younger
- Marcus Gheeraerts the Elder
- Christoffel Swarts
- Michael Coxcie
- Dirck Barendsz
- Lucas and Marten van Valckenborgh
- Hans Bol
- Frans and Gillis Mostart with Jan Mandijn
- Marinus van Reymerswaele
- Hendrik van Steenwijk I
- Bernaert de Rijcke
- Gielis Coignet
- Joris Hoefnagel
- Aert Mijtens
- Joos van Winghen
- Marten de Vos

Van Mander also described contemporary painters who he felt were of note. The following is a list of all of these painters.

- Hans Vredeman de Vries
- Stradanus
- Gillis van Coninxloo
- Bartholomeus Spranger
- Cornelis Ketel
- Gualdrop Gortzius
- Michiel Jansz van Mierevelt
- Hendrick Goltzius
- Hendrick Cornelisz Vroom
- Jan Soens
- Hans von Aachen
- Peter Candid
- Paul Bril and Matthijs Bril
- Cornelis van Haarlem, with Gerrit Pietersz Sweelink
- Jacob de Gheyn II
- Otto van Veen, Jan Snellinck, Tobias Verhaecht, Adam van Noort, Hendrick van Balen, Sebastian Vrancx, Joos de Momper
- Hans Rottenhammer, Hans Donauer, Adam Elsheimer, Lodewijk Toeput
- Joachim Wtewael
- Abraham Bloemaert
- Pieter Cornelisz van Rijck
- Francesco Badens
- David Vinckboons
- Cornelis Floris de Vriendt, Paulus Moreelse, Michael Mierevelt, Frans de Grebber, Jacob Savery, Cornelis Claesz van Wieringen, Barend and Paulus van Someren, Cornelis van der Voort, Everard Crynsz van der Maes, Jan Antonisz. van Ravesteyn, Aart Jansz Druyvesteyn, Jacques de Mosscher, Thonis Ariaensz (Alkmaar), Claes Jacobsz van der Heck (Alkmaar), Pieter Gerritsz Montfoort (Delft), Pieter Diericksen Cluyt (Delft)
- Joan Ariaensz van Leiden, and Hubert Tons van Rotterdam

=== Commentary on the Metamorphoses of Publius Ovidius Nasso ===
Van Mander had received a humanist training and had earlier published a translation of Ovid's Metamorphoses. In the Schilder-Boeck he provided a commentary on the Metamorphoses. Van Mander accepted the Renaissance view that there was no conflict between classical mythology and Old Testament history and that mythology was able to convey evangelical truths and lessons. For instance, the myth of the Titans assaulting Jupiter's throne could be interpreted as an illustration of the Christian dictum that pride is the cause of all evil. The allegorized interpretation of the Metamorphoses of Ovid in the Schilder-Boeck is inspired by this Renaissance view of classical mythology.

This part was well-received and was later sold as a separate book.

=== Depiction of figures ===
The final book about the depiction of figures contains a list of various animals, birds and other objects that can have meaning for the painter to include in his arrangement. This book includes some pagan rituals for use in historical allegories. Included before the index to the Metamorphoses, it is meant as an extra guide for that book.

== The indexes ==
Because the pages are numbered only on the right-hand page, the indexes have an addendum to the page number to indicate the front (recto) or back (verso) of the "folio" to be able to locate text more efficiently. Looking up painters remains difficult because the indexes use first names rather than last names, since the last names in use by the painters themselves were not consistent in all regions where the painters were active. Many painters were better known by their nicknames than their given names. For this reason, the spelling of the names used in the text does not always match the names in the indexes.

== Legacy ==
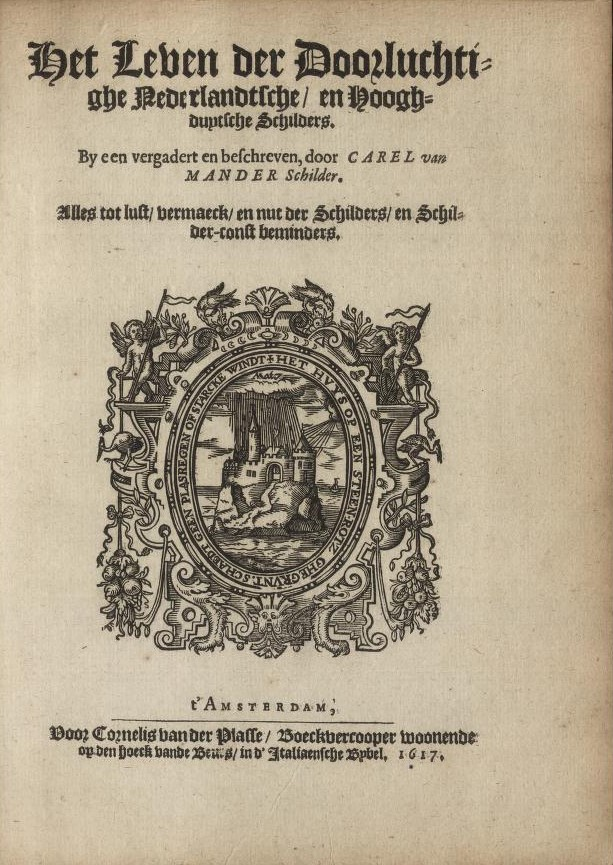
Title page of fourth part on Netherlandish and High-German painters

The Schilder-Boeck introduced Dutch and Flemish artists to Italian art and encouraged them to travel to Italy.

The Schilder-Boeck was very influential on art writing in the seventeenth and eighteenth centuries. Cornelis de Bie (Gulden Cabinet, 1662), Joachim von Sandrart (Teutsche Akademie, 1675), Samuel Dirksz van Hoogstraten (Inleyding tot de hooge schoole der schilderkonst, 1678), Filippo Baldinucci (Notizie de' Professori, 1681) and Arnold Houbraken (Schouburg, 1720) are some of the early biographers who used material from the Schilder-Boeck for their biographical sketches of Netherlandish painters or as a basis for developing their own art theory.

The Lives of the illustrious Netherlandish and German painters is the longest book in the Schilder-Boeck. It has historically been and still is the most important book for historians looking for details on (early) Netherlandish painters. This book is still the most-cited primary source in biographical accounts of the lives of many artists he included. Of most interest to historians is his criticism of the work of these artists, especially when he describes the painting style, use of color, location and owner of the paintings, thus becoming a valuable source for art provenance.

The Schilder-Boeck is included in the Basic Library of the dbnl (Canon of Dutch Literature), which contains what its compilers believe to be the 1,000 most important works in Dutch literature from the Middle Ages to today.

== Translation ==
The Lives of the illustrious Netherlandish and German painters was translated into modern Dutch and English by Miedema and published in the 1990s. In his attempt to provide a systematic overview of the Lives, Miedema includes a long list of the sources on which Karel van Mander relied as he did for his own modern translation, and includes prints, photos of paintings, sculpture, architecture and stained glass window cartoons to illustrate the text. He also publishes new archival evidence.
