= Claes Jacobsz van der Heck =

Dutch painter (c. 1575 – 1652)

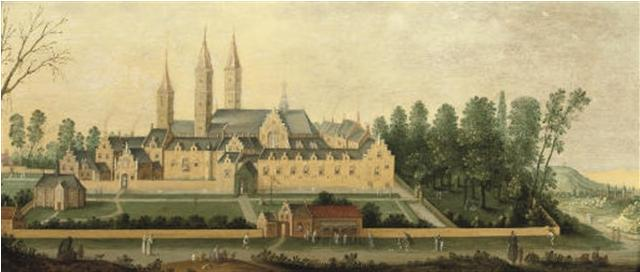
A view of Egmond Abbey, from the collection of Jacques Goudstikker

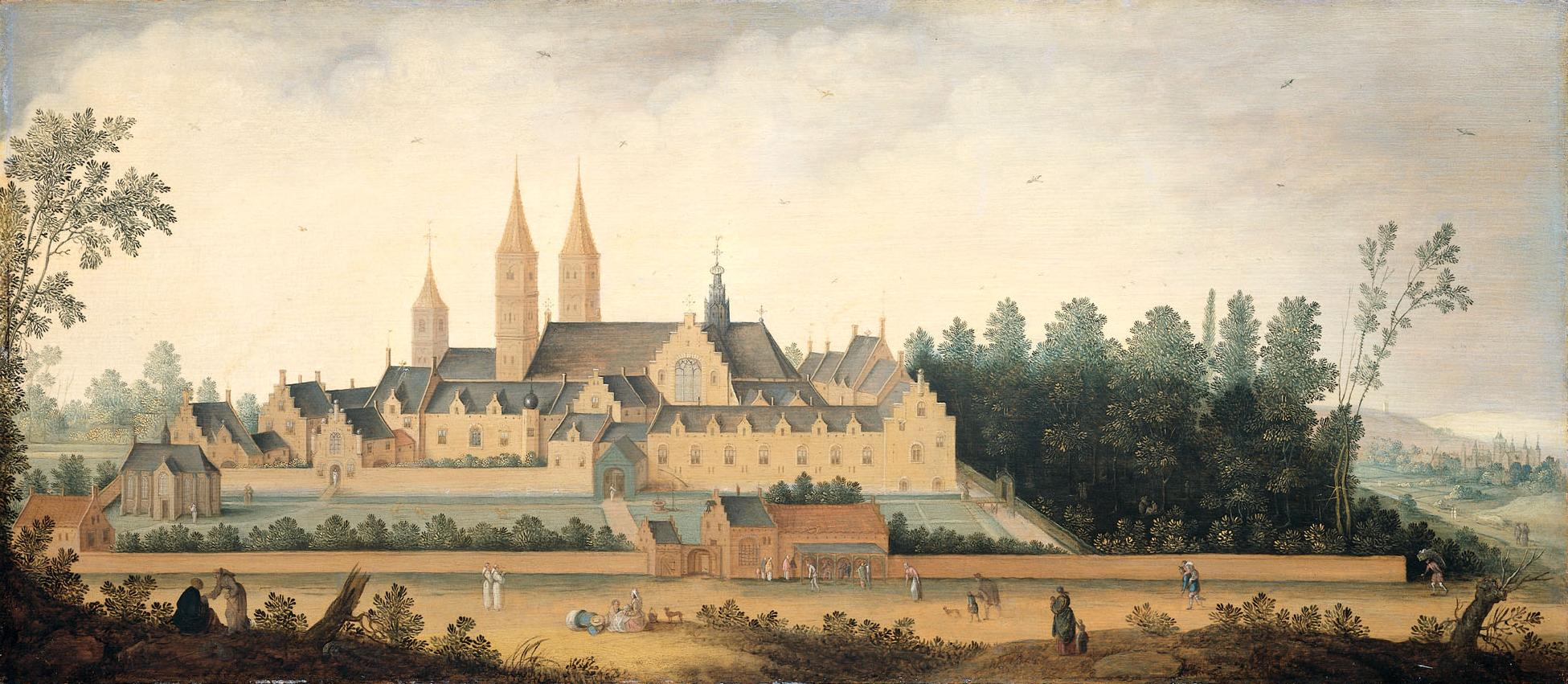
The same view of Egmond Abbey by his relative Claes Dircksz van der Heck

Claes Jacobsz van der Heck (Nicolaes Jacobsz van der Heck) (c. 1575 in Alkmaar – 1652 in Alkmaar) was a Dutch Golden Age painter.

== Biography ==
Claes Jacobsz van der Heck was the son of Jacob Dircksz (c. 1534–1608) and Adriana (died 1591) van der Heck, and the grand-nephew of painter Maarten van Heemskerck. According to Hessel Miedema's notes on this family in his translation of Karel van Mander's Schilder-boeck, "Jacques van der Heck" (or Jacob Dircksz) was a son of Maarten van Heemskerck's sister Neeltje and her husband Dirk van der Heck. Jacques' son "Niclaes" was Claes Jacobsz van der Heck. Heemskerck had disinherited "another nephew" (presumably a Dirk Dirksz, the later father of Claes Dircksz van der Heck), and left a portion in his will to Jacob Dircksz.

According to Karel van Mander, he was a good painter, a disciple of Jan Nagel, and specialized in landscapes. According to Houbraken who mentions that he was listed on the last page of the Schilder-boeck, his works hung in the Alkmaar city hall when he was writing, and he mentions landscape views of Egmond Abbey, a Judgment of Solomon, portraits, and other historical allegories. Claes Jacobsz specialized in views of abbeys and castles. Regarding Egmond, "Dr. S. de Vries suggests that van der Heck's prototype was probably the view by Gilles de Saens in the Townhall, Zottegem."

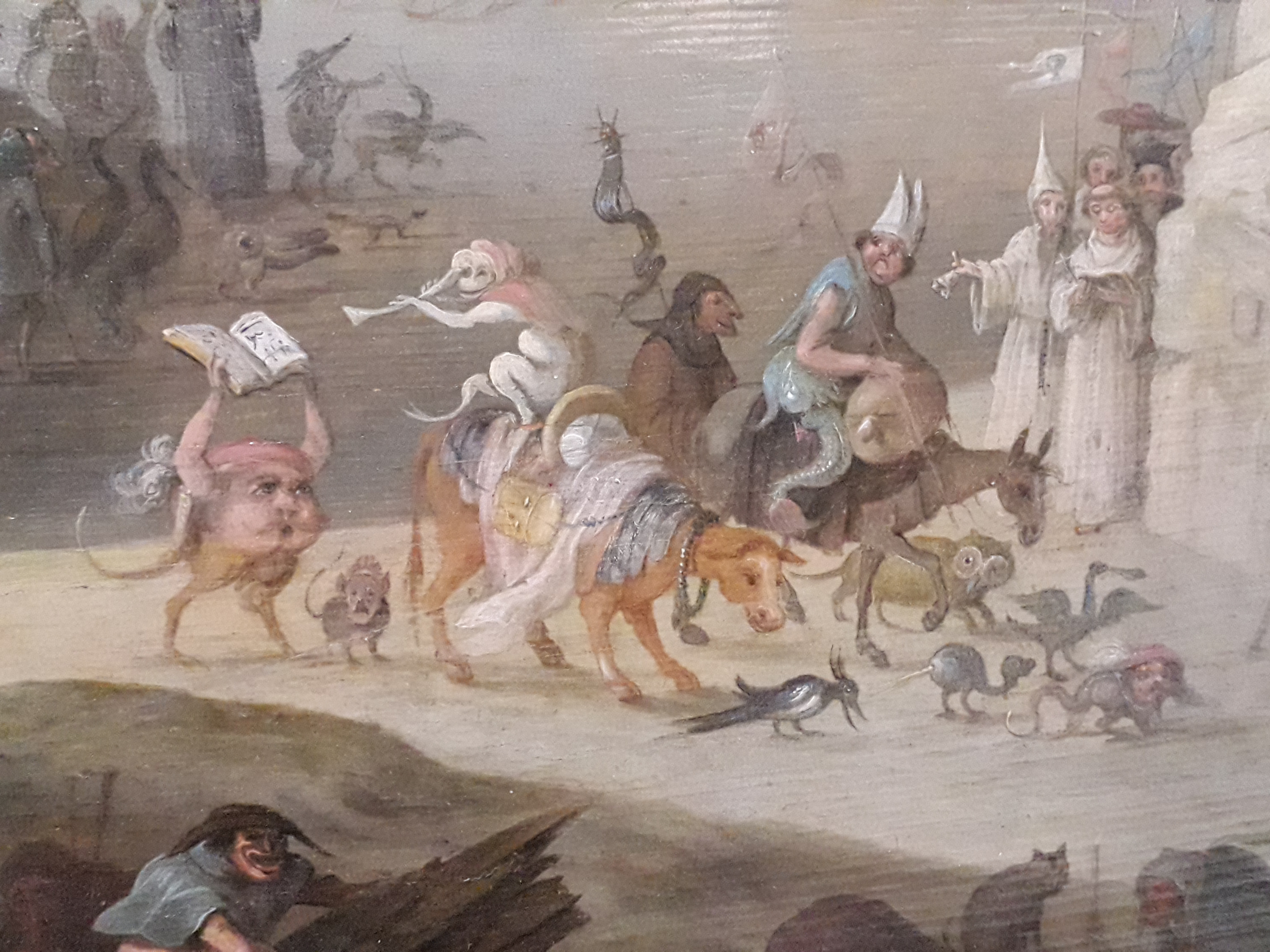
Sabbat de sorcières (1635)

Claes Jacobsz helped set up the Alkmaar Guild of Saint Luke in 1631–32. According to the RKD much of his work hangs in the Stedelijk Museum Alkmaar. Several of his landscapes of Egmond hang in that museum and one of them shows a landscape of Egmond aan Zee as it looked before it was washed to sea in 1717.

Known as the "master of Alkmaar", Claes Jacobsz also designed and created coats of arms and guild-banners.

He was second cousin to landscape painter Claes Dircksz van der Heck, who made similar landscapes and probably worked in the same workshop.

According to Houbraken, Claes Jacobsz was the father of Marten Heemskerck van der Heck. Other offspring were the notary Jacob Claesz van der Heck and the apothecary Cornelis van der Heck.
