= Mayken Verhulst =

Flemish artist (1518–1600)

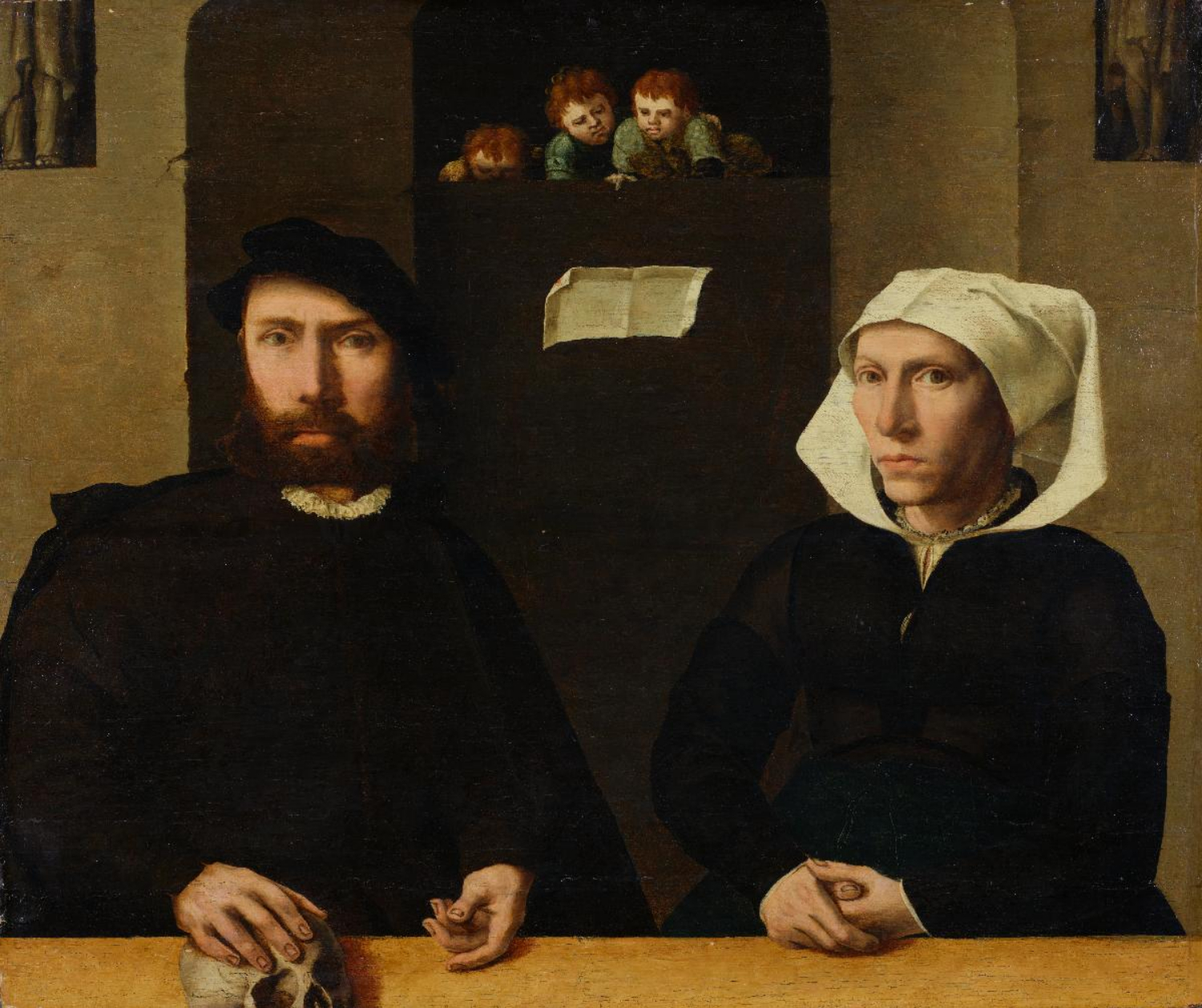
Possibly a portrait of Pieter Coecke van Aelst, His Wife Mayken Verhulst and Their Children

Mayken Verhulst (1518–1596 or 1599), also known as Marie Bessemers, was a sixteenth-century miniaturiste, tempera and watercolor painter and print publisher flemish. She was actively engaged in the workshop of her husband, Pieter Coecke van Aelst, posthumously publishing his works. While she is recognized as an exceptionally skilled artist, little is known about her works or life as there are few surviving sources.

== Life ==
Mayken Verhulst was born in Mechelen around 1518 as the daughter of Peeter Verhulst Bessemeers (1492–1553) and Margriet Dancerme (1493–1545). Her father was a painter and she learned the artist craft in her father's workshop. Her sister Lysbeth married the engraver and painter Hubert Goltzius, and her sister Barbara married the painter Jacob de Punder. She married Pieter Coecke van Aelst (called the Elder) around 1535 as his second wife. Van Aelst was 16 years older than her and already a prominent painter, sculptor, architect, author and designer of woodcuts, goldsmith's work, stained glass and tapestries. Before they married he had made a perilous journey to Turkey from which he had brought back a great number of drawings. He became later court painter to Charles V, Holy Roman Emperor.

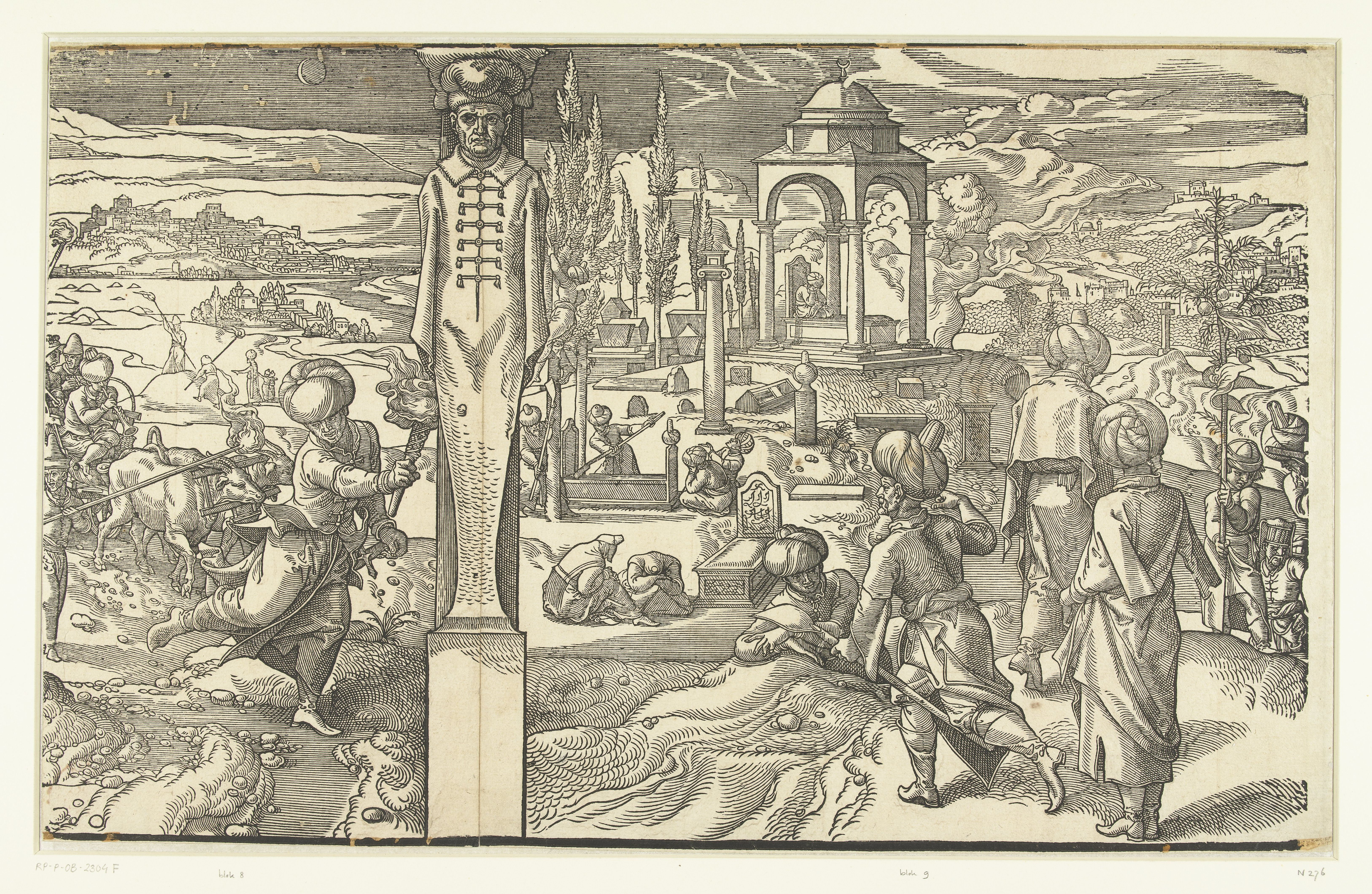
Ces Moeurs et Fachons de Faire des Turcz, detail

They lived together in Antwerp from 1540 to 1545, then moved to Brussels. Verhulst worked in her husband's workshop until his death in 1550. They had three children: Pieter II, Kathelijne and Mayken (who married in 1563 the great painter Pieter Brueghel the Elder). Mayken was, according to the early biographer Karel van Mander, the first teacher of her grandsons Pieter Brueghel the Younger and Jan Brueghel the Elder.

She was buried on 11 April 1600 in Mechelen.

=== Works ===
Following Pieter Coecke's death in 1550, she likely oversaw the publication of a large scroll made by conjoining multiple woodcuts entitled Ces Moeurs et Fachons de Faire des Turcz (Manners and Customs of the Turks) (1553) (copies of which are in the collections of the Rijksmuseum, the Metropolitan Museum of Art and the British Museum. This print was originally designed by van Aelst as a tapestry design, strategically published by Verhulst as a print after his death to showcase his work.

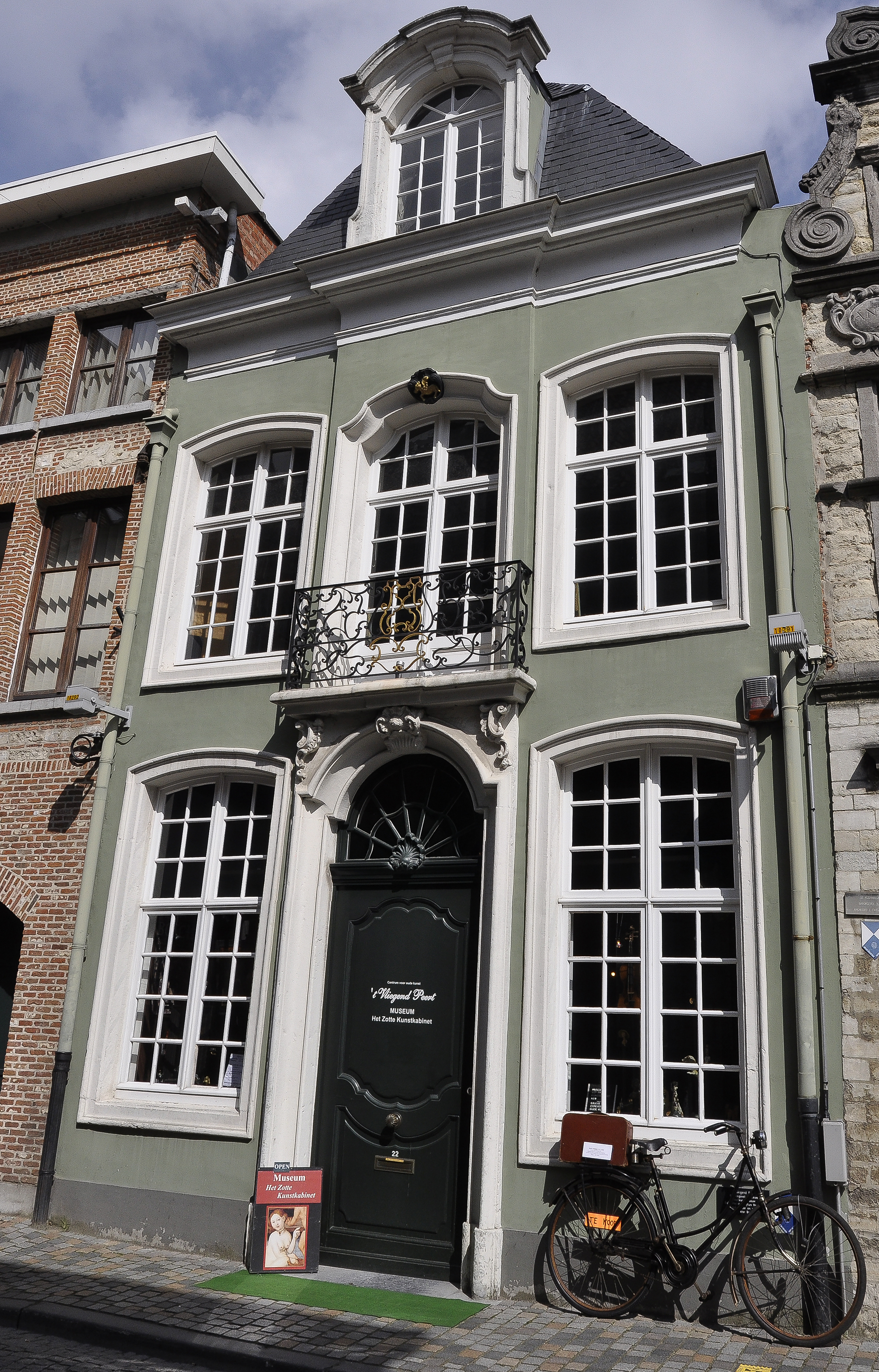
t Vliegend Peert in Mechelen

No works survive that can be securely attributed to Verhulst, although she is frequently identified as the person behind several works assigned to the Master of the Brunswick Monogram.

== Legacy ==
While little is definitively known about her life and works, Guicciardini's Descrittione places her alongside Susanna Horenbout, Levina Teerlinc, and Caterina van Hemessen, suggesting her remarkable talents.

Verhulst was the first teacher of her grandsons, Pieter Brueghal the Younger and Jan Brueghal the Elder, both prominent Flemish Baroque painters.

Her house and former painter's workshop, 't Vliegend Peert is a historic monument in Mechelen. It is a museum named Het Zotte Kunstkabinet.

== Sources ==
- Bergmans, Simone. "Le Problème de Jan van Hemessen, monogrammatiste de Brunswick," in Revue belge d'archéologie et d'histoire de l'art, vol. 24, 1955, pp. 133–57.
- Di Furia, Arthur J., "Towards an Understanding of Mayken Verhulst and Volcxken Diericx", in Women Artists and Patrons in the Netherlands, 1500–1700 edited by Elizabeth A. Sutton, 157–177. Amsterdam: Amsterdam University Press, 2019.
- Greer, Germaine. The Obstacle Race, p. 26.
- King, Catherine. "Looking a Sight: Sixteenth-Century Portraits of Woman Artists," in Zeitschrift für Kunstgeschichte, vol. 58, 1995, pp. 381–406.
- Op de Beeck, Jan. "Pieter Bruegel, Mayken Verhulst en Mechelen". In: De Zotte Schilders. (p. 17–29. Ed. Snoeck.2003. ISBN 90-5349-423-5.
- Op de Beeck, Jan, Mayken Verhulst (1518–1599). The Turkish Manners of an Artistic Lady. Mechelen: Museum Het Zotte Kunstkabinet, 2005. ISBN 90-90-19982-9.
- Piland, Sherry, Women artists : an historical, contemporary and feminist bibliography. London: The Scarecrow Press. 1994.
- Ruby, Louisa Wood, "An early wooded landscape by Jan Brueghel the Elder", The Burlington Magazine, 1312, vol. 154 (2012): 476–481.
- Slater, Alexis Diane, Mayken Verhulst: A Professional Woman Painter and Print Publisher in the Sixteenth-Century Low Countries. Austin: The University of Texas at Austin, 2019, online
- "Woodcut offers panoramic view of 16th-century Muslim life." Yale Bulletin & Calendar 18 January 2002. (accessed 21 May 2007)
- Haar naam was Mayken (in Dutch)
