= Pieter Coecke van Aelst =

Flemish painter, sculptor, architect, author and designer (1502–1550)

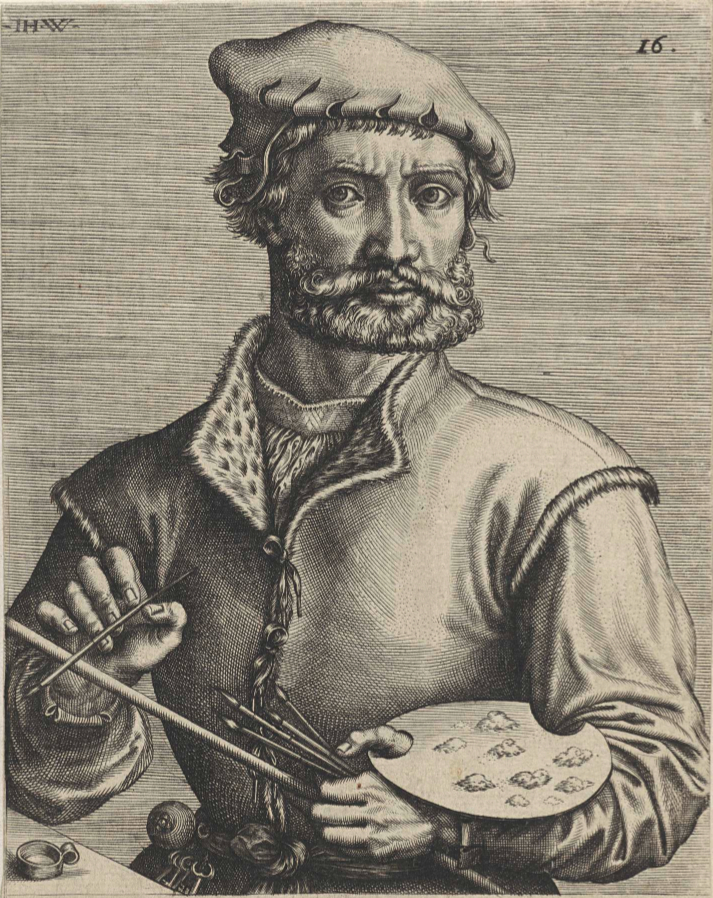
- Coecke van Aelst, engraving by Johannes Wierix
- Born: Pieter Coecke van Aelst; 14 August 1502; Aalst, Habsburg Netherlands
- Died: 6 December 1550 (aged 48); Brussels, Habsburg Netherlands

Pieter Coecke van Aelst or Pieter Coecke van Aelst the Elder (14 August 1502 – 6 December 1550) was a Flemish painter, sculptor, architect, author and designer of woodcuts, goldsmith's work, stained glass and tapestries. His principal subjects were Christian religious themes. He hailed from the Duchy of Brabant, worked in Antwerp and Brussels, and was appointed court painter to Charles V, Holy Roman Emperor.

Coecke van Aelst was a polyglot. He published translations into Flemish (Dutch), French and German of Ancient Roman and modern Italian architectural treatises. These publications played a pivotal role in the dissemination of Renaissance ideas in Northern Europe. They contributed to the transition in Northern Europe from the late Gothic style then prevalent towards a modern 'antique-oriented' architecture.

== Life ==
Pieter Coecke van Aelst was born in Aalst, where his father was Deputy Mayor. The early Flemish biographer Karel van Mander wrote in his Schilder-boeck published in 1604 that Coecke van Aelst studied under Bernard van Orley, a leading Renaissance painter based in Brussels. There are no documents that prove this apprenticeship but there are strong stylistic similarities between the styles of the two artists.

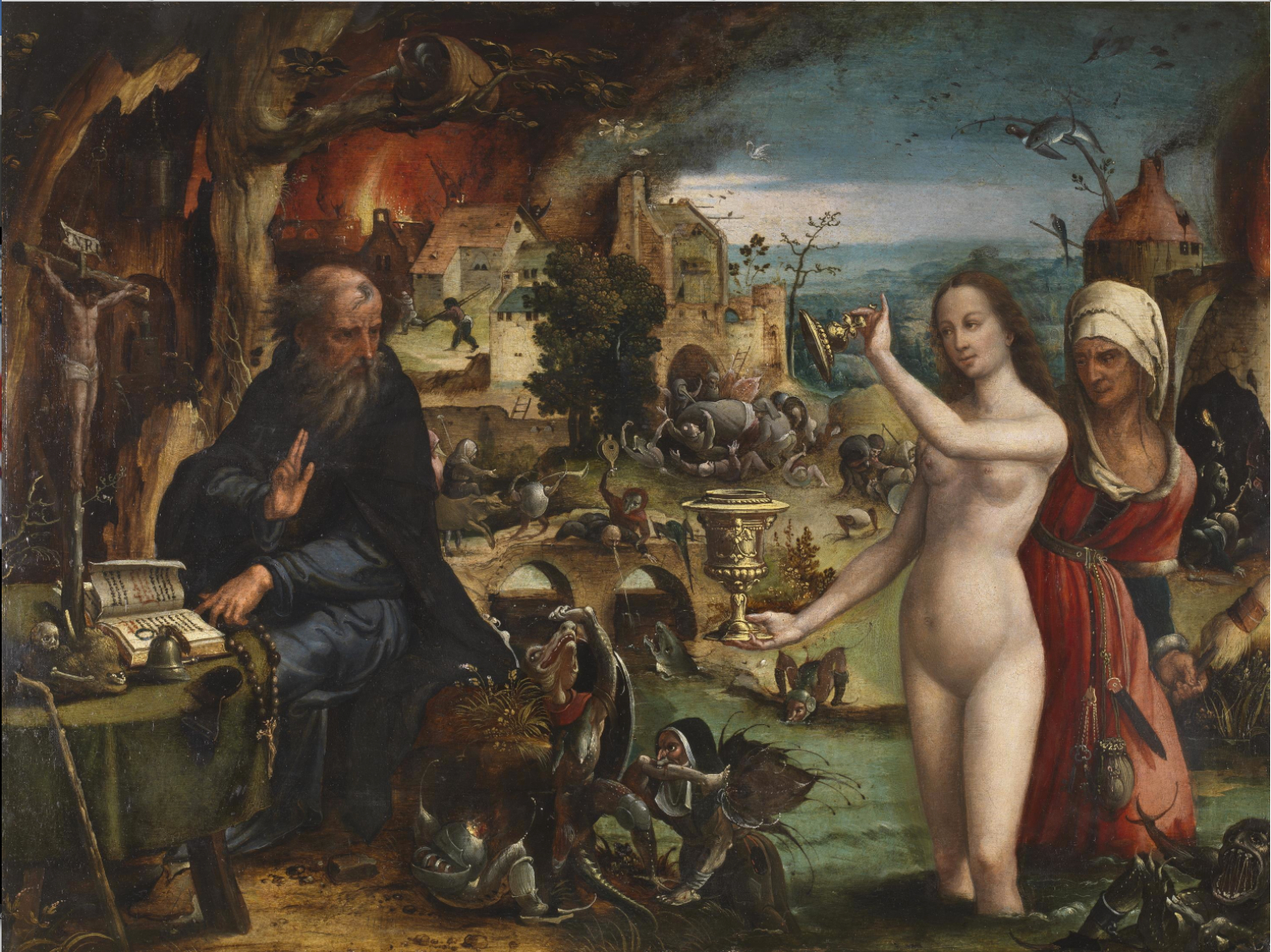
The temptation of St Anthony

According to Karel van Mander, Pieter Coecke van Aelst later studied in Italy, where in Rome he made drawings after Classical sculpture and architecture. Although there is no firm evidence that Coecke van Aelst travelled to Italy, stylistic evidence supports the notion that he did. While the Italian influence in his work could be attributed to the fact that Raphael’s tapestry cartoons were available in Brussels, where they were used for the manufacture of tapestries around 1516, the fact that Coecke van Aelst seems also to have been familiar with Raphael's fresco of the Triumph of Galatea located in the Villa Farnesina in Rome suggests that he did in fact travel there.

Pieter Coecke van Aelst married twice. He married his first wife Anna van Dornicke in 1525 shortly after his move to Antwerp. Anna was the daughter of Jan Mertens van Dornicke, one of the most successful painters working in Antwerp. His father in law was possibly his teacher. Coecke van Aelst took over his father-in-law's workshop after the latter's death in 1527. There were two children from this first marriage, Michiel and Pieter II. The latter was a painter. Printer Maarten Peeters and his wife were the legal guardians of Michiel and Pieter. After the death of his first wife before 1529, Coecke van Aelst had an affair with Anthonette van der Sandt (also known as Antonia van der Sant). The pair never married but had a daughter, Antonette, and at least one son, Pauwel who also became a painter.

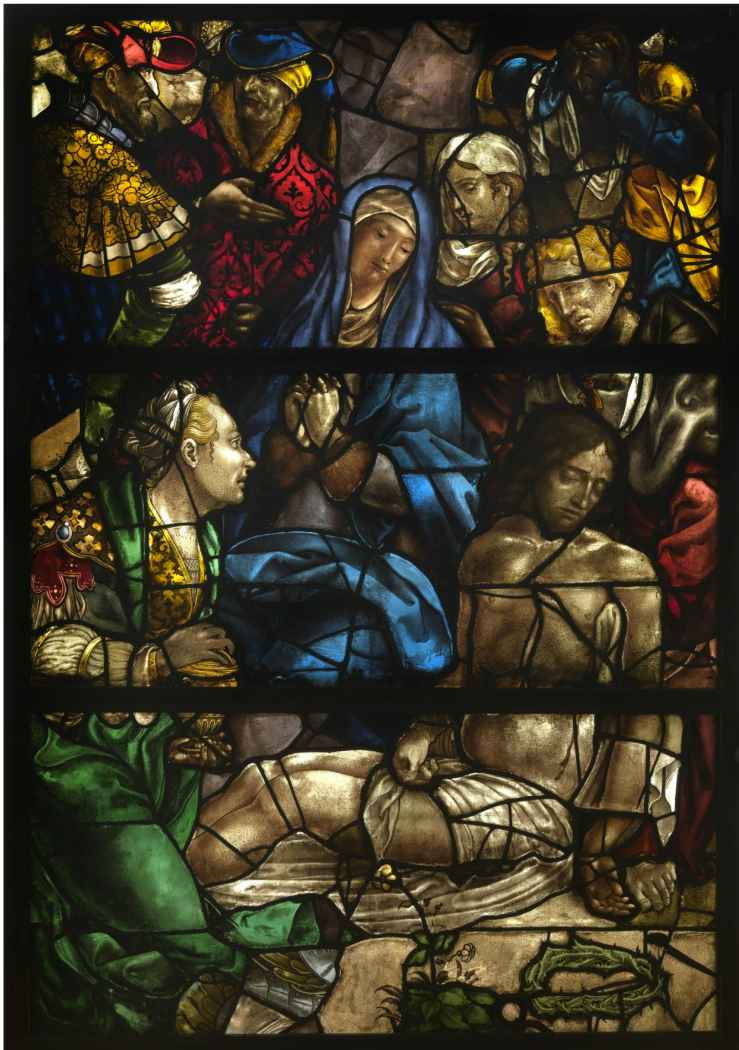
Pietà, stained glass

Coecke van Aelst is recorded joining the local Guild of Saint Luke of Antwerp in 1527. In 1533, he travelled to Constantinople where he stayed for one year during which he tried to convince the Turkish sultan to give him commissions for tapestries. This mission failed to generate any commissions from the sultan. Coecke made many drawings during his stay in Turkey including of the buildings, people and the indigenous flora. He seems to have retained from this trip an abiding interest in the accurate rendering of nature that gave his tapestries an added dimension. The drawings which Coecke van Aelst made during his stay in Turkey were posthumously published by his widow under the title Ces moeurs et fachons de faire de Turcz avecq les regions y appertenantes ont este au vif contrefaictez (Antwerp, 1553).

Upon his return to Antwerp in 1534, Coecke van Aelst produced designs for a large-scale figure, called 'Druon Antigoon' or the 'Giant of Antwerp' of which the head in papier-maché possibly still survives (Museum aan de Stroom, Antwerp). The giant made its premiere many years later in 1549 at the occasion of the Joyous entry into Antwerp of Prince Philip (the future Philip II). The giant became a regular fixture in public processions in Antwerp until the 20th century. In the year 1537 Coecke van Aelst was elected a dean of the Antwerp Guild of Saint Luke. He also received a stipend from the Antwerp city government. Around this time Coecke van Aelst received major commissions for the design of stained-glass windows including for the Antwerp Cathedral.

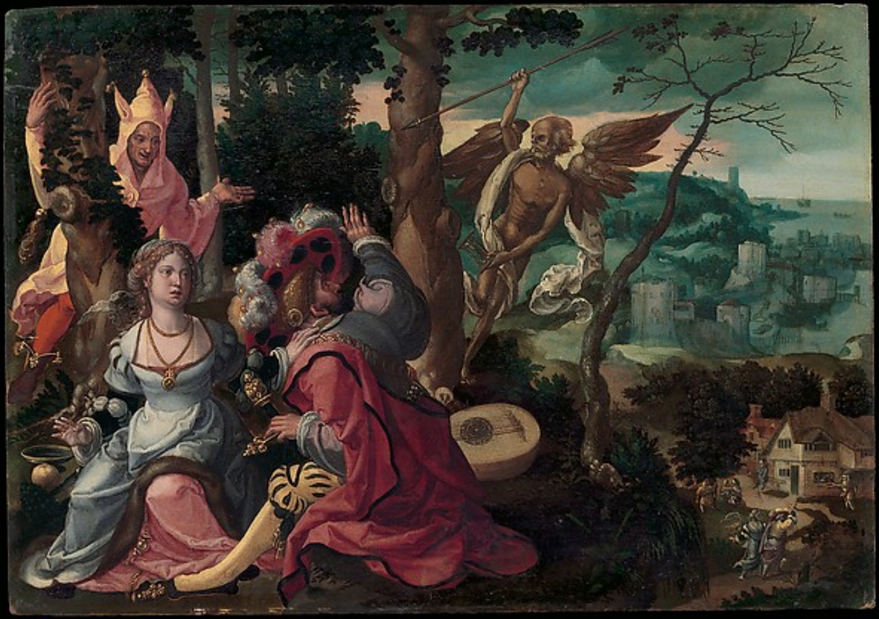
Lovers Surprised by a Fool and Death

Around 1538–1539 Coecke van Aelst married for the second time. His second wife Mayken Verhulst was originally from Mechelen and a painter of miniatures. The couple had three children, two daughters called Katelijne and Maria and a son named Pauwel (even though he had another son with this name). The prominent painter Pieter Brueghel the Elder married Coecke van Aelst's daughter Maria (called 'Mayken'). Karel van Mander has asserted that Coecke van Aelst's second wife was the first teacher of her grandchildren, Pieter Brueghel the Younger and Jan Brueghel the Elder. Through his marriage with Mayken Verhulst, Pieter Coecke became a brother-in-law of the prominent printmaker and publisher Hubertus Goltzius who had married Mayken's sister Elisabeth.

There is speculation that Coecke set up a second workshop in Brussels but there is no evidence for this. Coecke van Aelst was appointed court painter to Charles V only a few months prior to his death. Coecke was in Brussels in 1550 where he died in December. As his two youngest children died at the same time, it is possible that all three family members were victims of a contagious epidemic.

His students included leading painters such as Gillis van Coninxloo, Willem Key, Hans Vredeman de Vries, Michiel Coxcie, and possibly Pieter Brueghel the Elder.

== Work ==
=== General ===
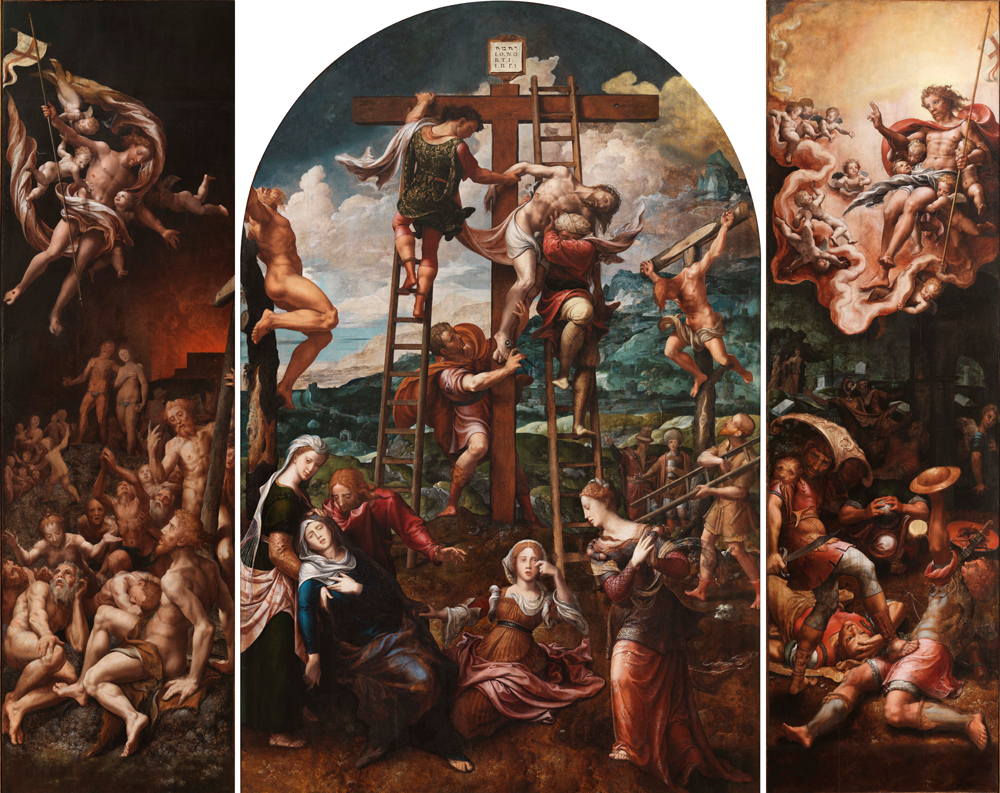
Descent from the Cross

Aanbidding der wijzen. Musea Brugge-Groeningemuseum.

Pieter Coecke van Aelst was a versatile artist and a master designer who devised projects across a wide range of different media, including panel paintings, sculptures, prints, tapestries, stained glass and goldsmith's work. No signed and few reliably documented paintings by Coecke van Aelst have survived.

His drawings are an important witness to his skills as they are the only body of works by the artist, which are autograph. Approximately forty drawings are regarded as autograph, in addition to cartoons and cartoon fragments on which he likely worked with assistants. A majority of his drawings are related to his tapestry designs.

In his art Coecke showed his ambition to emulate contemporary Italian artists. From the later 1520s his works start to reveal the Italian influence, as is noticeable in his figures, which gain in monumentality, and the greater movement and drama in his compositions. His main model was Raphael and his circle. Coecke was likely already familiar with their compositions in Antwerp. However, when he traveled to Constantinople around 1533, he likely visited Mantua, where Raphael's leading pupil Giulio Romano was active at the time. Romano possessed a large collection of Raphael's drawings and Coecke must have availed himself of the opportunity to study these in detail during his visit. After his return to Flanders Coecke's style changed dramatically and approached the Italian models he had studied.

Coecke operated a large workshop, which was organized in an efficient manner. He acted as an entrepreneur who provided his assistants with his original inventions, which were then turned into final works under his supervision. The style that he created was widely imitated.

=== Last Supper ===
Van Aelst's composition of the Last Supper became extremely popular in the 16th century and many versions were produced. The version dated 1527 in the collection of the Duke and Duchess of Rutland, Belvoir Castle, Grantham, England is believed to be the original, from which all the others were derived. The composition was popularised through a print after it made by Hendrik Goltzius.

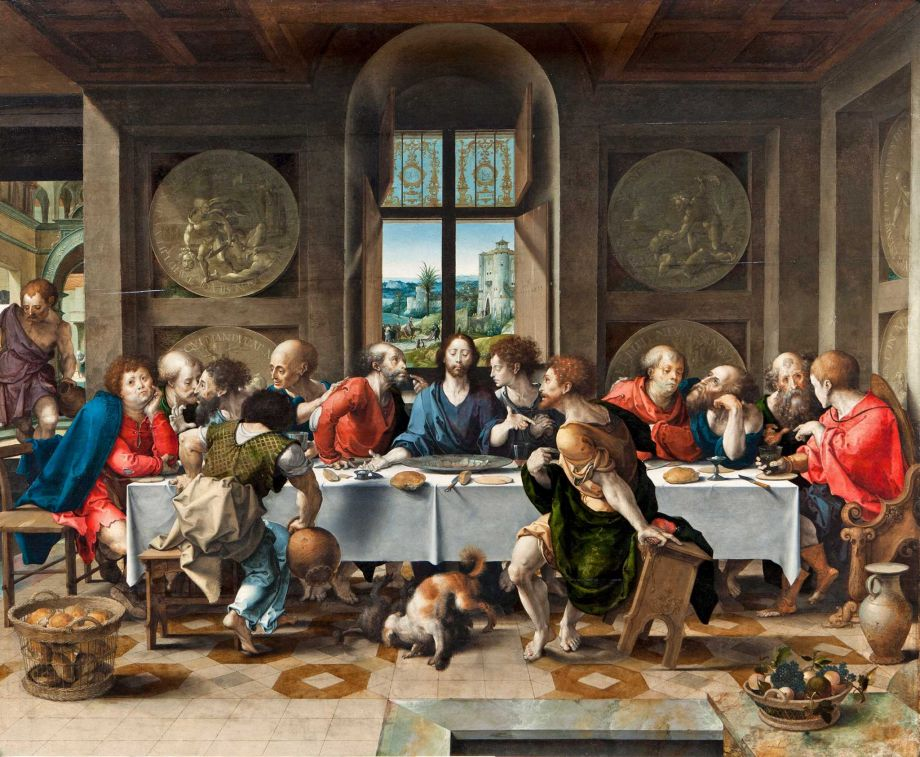
The Last Supper

Van Aelst's painting of the subject was freely inspired by Leonardo da Vinci's Last Supper (1498, Convent of Santa Maria delle Grazie in Milan) and Marcantonio Raimondi's engraving of about 1515–1516 based on a lost drawing by Raphael. The gestures of the apostles are derived from Dürer's print of the Last Supper dated 1523. There exist about 45 versions of this composition, which were executed with the assistance of workshop assistants. A great number of the versions are dated, and of these 6 or 7 are dated 1528. Van Aelst likely produced the original drawing for the Last Supper, which was subsequently copied onto a panel by means of intermediary cartoons. The composition could be ordered in two formats: 50 x 60 cm and 60 x 80 cm. The large version was more popular than the smaller one.

Small biblical scenes in the background of the composition place the Last Supper in its theological context. Through the window it is possible to discern a scene depicting the Entry in Jerusalem of Jesus Christ, the principal event preceding the Last Supper according to Christian literature. Scenes of the Fall of Man and the Expulsion from Paradise can be discerned in the ornaments of the upper panes of the window. The medals on the wall depict the biblical stories of the Slaying of Abel and David and Goliath. The scene representing the slaying of Abel is based on a print by the prominent Romanist artist Jan Gossaert. The whole iconography accentuates the Christian occupation with original sin and the belief that mankind's salvation solely relies on Christ's sacrifice. The original version of 1527 expresses in some of its details an iconography, which shows a close link to the Protestant Reformation movement. In the other versions this meaning is less pronounced.

=== St. Jerome in his Study ===
Coecke van Aelst and his workshop produced multiple versions of St. Jerome in his Study.

Saint Jerome is revered by Christians for his translation into Latin of the Bible, which he produced while residing in a monastery in Palestine. One of the principal influences on the Flemish iconography of St. Jerome was Albrecht Dürer's St. Jerome in His Study completed in March 1521. In the version of the subject in the Walters Museum Coecke van Aelst suggests the Oriental setting by the view visible through the window which shows a landscape with camels. To the wall is affixed an admonition, "Cogita Mori" (Think upon death), a vanitas motif that is reiterated by the skull. Further reminders of the motifs of the passage of time and the imminence of death are the image of the Last Judgment visible in the saint's Bible, the candle and the hourglass.

Another version of this subject was sold at Christie's (28 January 2015, New York, lot 104). This version reprises iconographic elements, which stress Christian beliefs regarding the transience of human life and the importance of the sacrifice of Christ for people to find salvation at the time of the so-called Last Judgement. The work also clearly is close to Albrecht Dürer's St. Jerome in His Study of 1521.

=== Tapestry designs ===
Pieter Coecke van Aelst was renowned for his tapestry designs which were executed by the Brussels tapestry workshops. These designs were typically small-scale drawings in black-and-white. His cartoon for the Martyrdom of St. Peter (Brussels Town Hall) is in grisaille with touches of green and red while the names of the other colors, such as gold or blue, are written in.

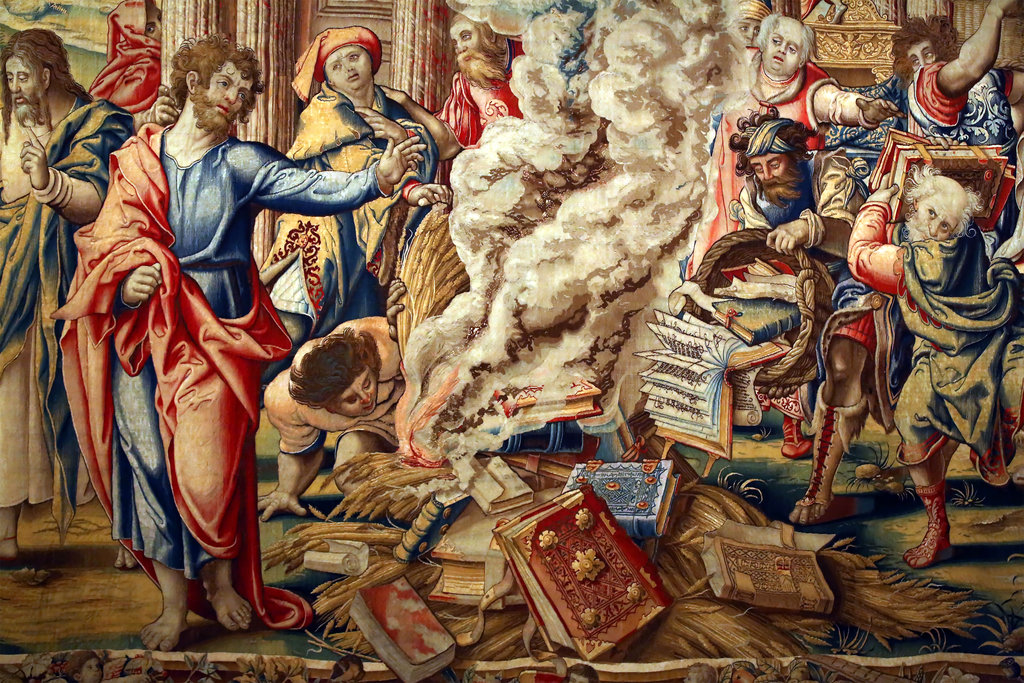
The Story of Saint Paul: The Burning of the Books at Ephesus (detail)

The patrons for the tapestries included Emperor Charles V, Francis I of France, Henry VIII of England and Cosimo de' Medici. His reputation as a tapestry designer was established through his popular series of the Story of Saint Paul, the Seven Deadly Sins, the Story of Abraham, the Story of Vertumnus and Pomona, the Story of Joshua, the Story of the Creation, Poesia, the Conquest of Tunis and Julius Caesar.

Between 1545 and 1550 Coecke designed tapestries in which the scenes are placed in architectural or landscape settings as is apparent in the Conquest of Tunis, the Poesia and the Story of the Creation tapestry series. Mary of Hungary, the Governor General of the Netherlands, appealed to Coecke to assist Jan Cornelisz Vermeyen with the design of the Conquest of Tunis tapestry series. The Conquest of Tunis series was designed around 1546 and recounts Charles V's successful recapture of Tunis from the Turks. The tapestries were designed about 11 years after the events they recount took place. Coecke and Vermeyen collaborated on the cartoons for the tapestries. Vermeyen had reportedly accompanied Charles V on the military expedition to Tunis and had made sketches of the people, events and landscapes that he observed during the campaign. The Conquest of Tunis tapestries were extensively used for propagandistic purposes by the Habsburg dynasty. They were displayed at all court festivities, state events and religious ceremonies and had pride of place in the principal reception rooms of the Brussels palace and later in the Alcázar palace.

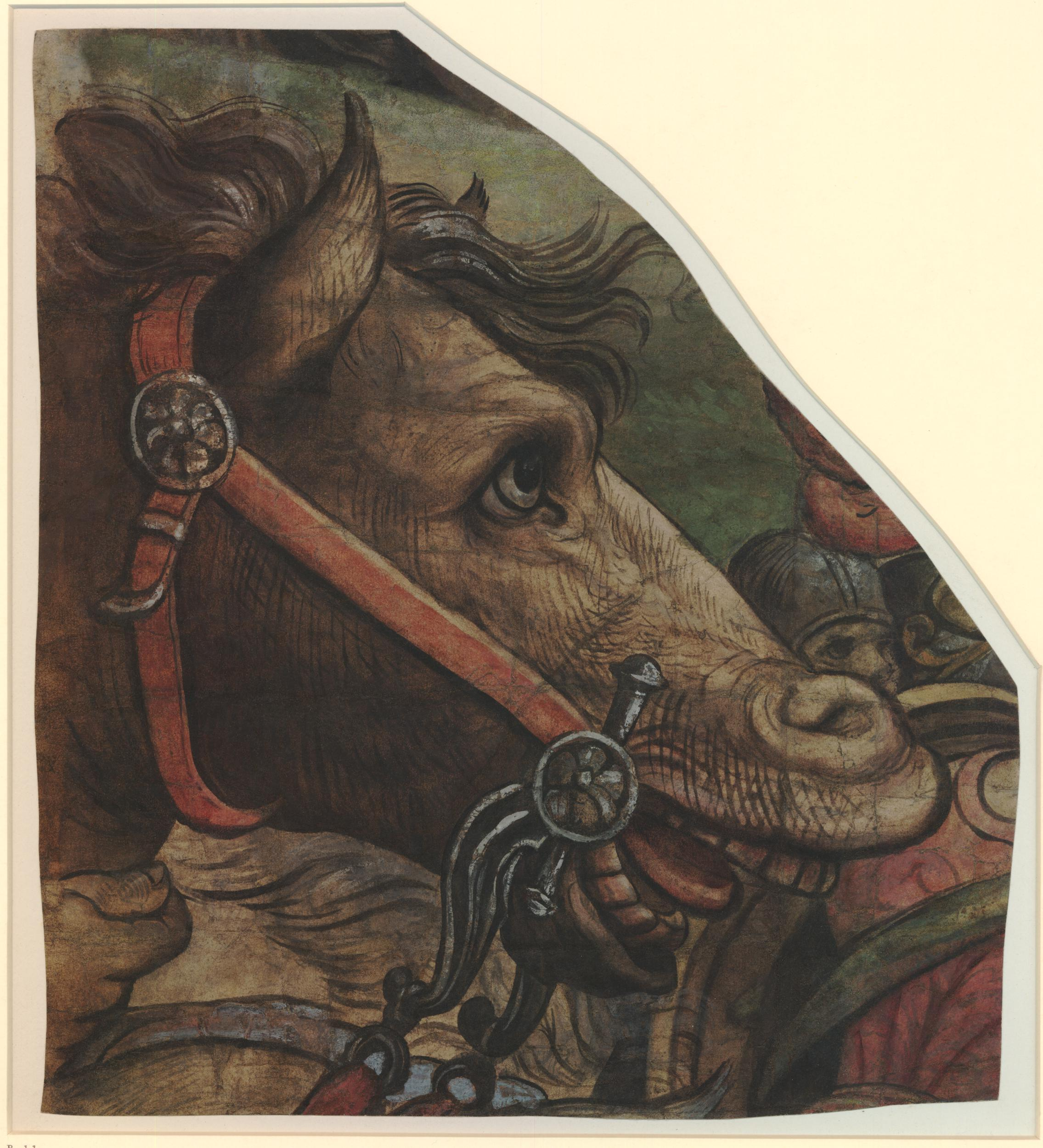
Head of a Horse, fragment of a tapestry design

The Poesia series was inspired by the stories in Ovid's Metamorphoses. Only one set of the tapestries was ever woven after they were designed around 1547–1548. King Philip II of Spain acquired the set in 1556. The Story of the Creation was designed around 1548 and acquired by Grand Duke Cosimo I de' Medici and his spouse Eleanor of Toledo.

=== Graphic works ===
Coecke van Aelst's studio was well known for its graphic works and publications. Coecke van Aelst had during his visit to Turkey made drawings of local sights and scenes. The drawings were published posthumously in 1553 by his widow Mayken Verhulst under the title Ces moeurs et fachons de faire de Turcz avecq les regions y appertenantes ont este au vif contrefaictez (Antwerp, 1553).

He was also the publisher and designer of a volume of prints entitled De seer wonderlijke...Triumphelijke Incompst van ... Prince Philips commemorating the Joyous entry into Antwerp of Prince Philip (the future Philip II) in 1549. Coecke had himself designed some of the triumphal arches and stages that were reproduced in the volume. It is believed that the appreciation for these prints at the Spanish court led to Coecke van Aelst's appointment as court painter to Charles V.

=== Architectural publications ===
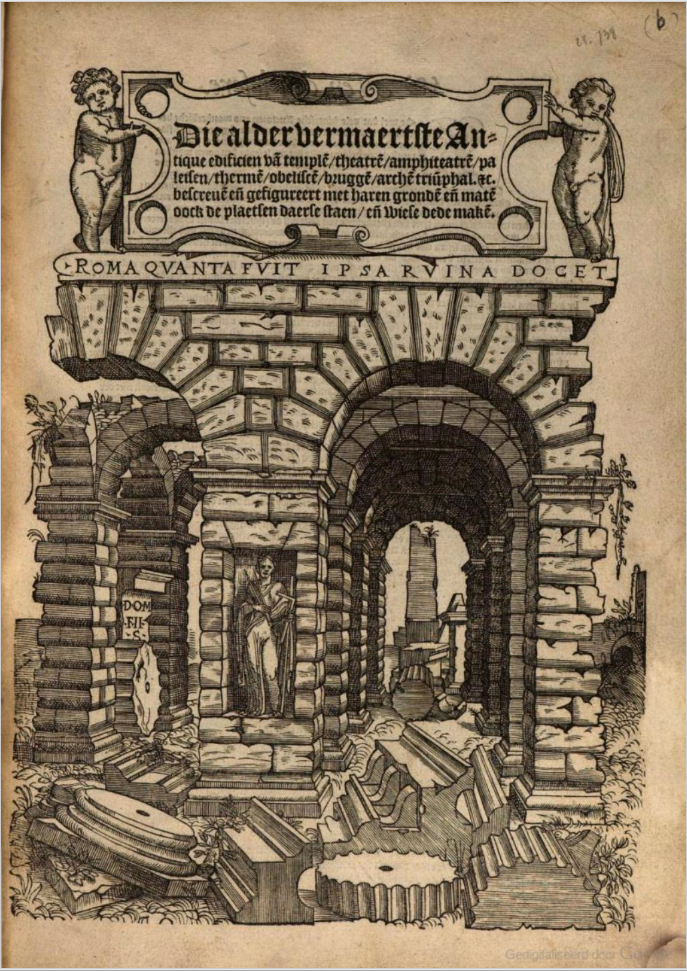
Title page of part III of Coecke's translation of Serlio's First Book

Pieter Coecke van Aelst was a gifted linguist and is noted for his translation of Vitruvius' De architectura into Flemish under the title Die inventie der colommen met haren coronementen ende maten. Wt Vitruuio ende andere diuersche auctoren optcorste vergadert, voor scilders, beeltsniders, steenhouders, &c. En allen die ghenuechte hebben in edificien der antiquen published first in 1539. He, and after his death, his widow Mayken Verhulst, published the five books of Sebastiano Serlio's architectural treatise Architettura in Flemish, French and High German (the German translation was done by another translator). The first translation published was the fourth book of the Architettura published under the title Generale Reglen der architecturen op de vyve manieren van edificie in 1539.

Coecke van Aelst's translation of Vitruvius was hailed by the humanist Dominicus Lampsonius as the only Dutch-language book to discuss the building styles of other countries. In line with Italian translations of Vitruvius published earlier in the 16th century, Coecke's translation gave prominence to woodcut illustrations of the text and used columns to indicate the difference between three kinds of architectural representation: plan, elevation, and view. This was a clear break with the few treatises on architecture published earlier in the Low Countries which generally did not provide any visual exegesis.

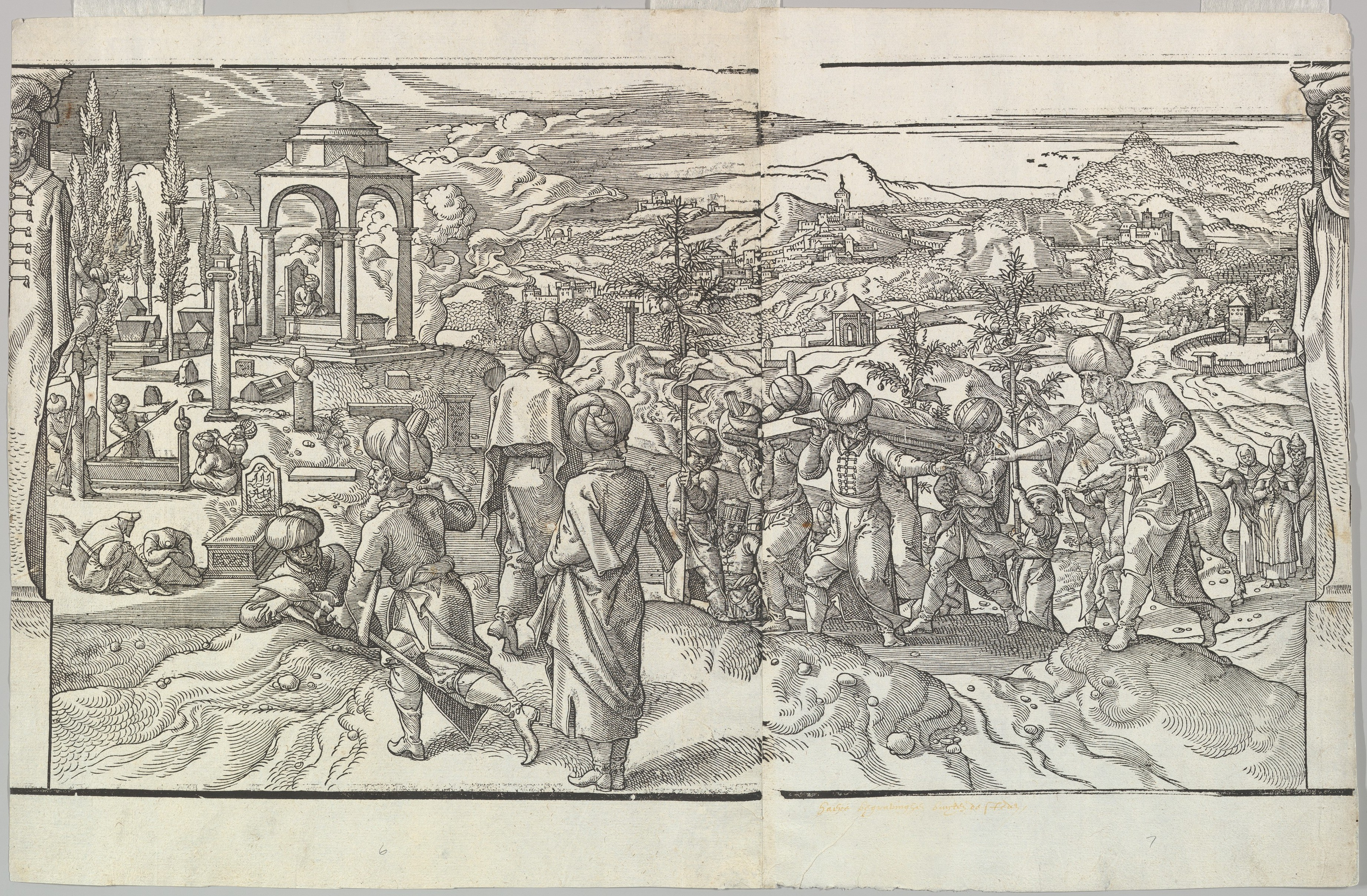
A Turkish Funeral

Coecke van Aelst's 1539 Flemish translation of Serlio provided to the Low Countries a relatively affordable translation of one of the first illustrated architectural treatises in Europe. The original Italian edition had appeared in Venice only two years earlier. Coecke van Aelst's Flemish (Dutch) edition in turn served as the basis for the first English translation of Serlio. The translations of Serlio's works were in fact pirated editions since Serlio never authorised Coecke to translate and publish his works. In the Flemish translation of volume IV Serlio was only mentioned in the notice to the reader and in the colophon. The first translation in French by Coecke (also of Book IV) dated 1542 only mentioned Serlio in the colophon. In the first German translation dated 1543 Coecke mentioned Jacob Rechlinger from Augsburg as the translator but remained silent on Serlio's authorship. Serlio was clearly unhappy with these unauthorised translations and repeatedly threatened to sue Coecke who was, however, safe from prosecution as Coecke lived in a region under Spanish control while Serlio resided in France, an enemy of Spain.

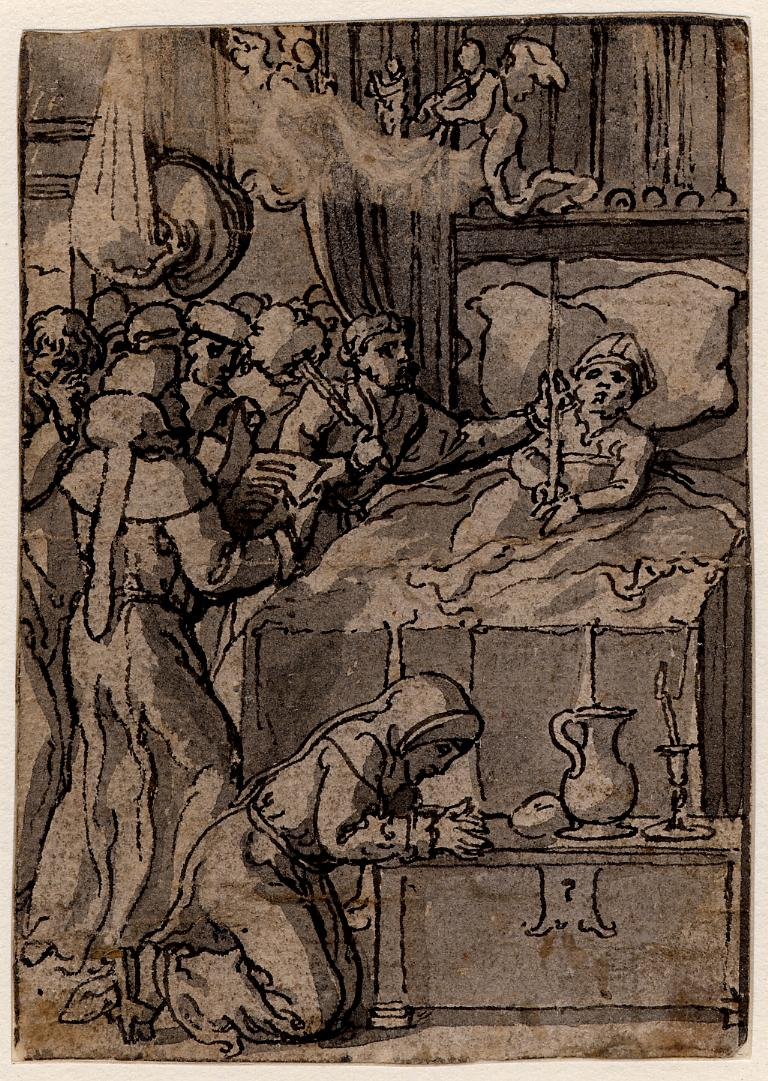
Dying bishop in bed surrounded by monks

The translations of these important Roman and Italian architectural works played a crucial role in spreading Renaissance ideas to the Low Countries and hastening the transition from the late Gothic style prevalent in the area at the time towards a modern "antique-oriented" architecture in Northern Europe. The translations were further instrumental in establishing a theoretical distinction between the acts of planning and executing a building. This led to the development of architecture as a new independent discipline distinguished from the craft of stonemason. In the Low Countries the relation between architecture and perspective also acquired theoretical backing in Coecke van Aelst's translations. Coecke's translations of architectural publications had an important impact on the architect and graphic artist Hans Vredeman de Vries who is said to have assiduously copied their designs.

In the interest of 'localisation', Coecke van Aelst's translation made significant changes to Serlio's original designs. For instance in one illustration he inserted 24 Latin block-letter patterns where Serlio had placed woodcuts of shields.
