= Albert Simonsz =

Dutch painter

Albert Simonsz was a historical painter, born at Haarlem in 1523, told Karel van Mander in 1604 that he had been a scholar of Jan Mostaert 60 years previously when Mostaert himself was already an old man of 70. Van Mander noted his remark because Simonsz also said that Mostaert had claimed he had never heard of Ouwater (or Geertgen tot Sint Jans). The 18th-century writer Jacobus de Jongh was the first to extrapolate Simonsz' birth year from his statements to Karel van Mander. Simonsz clearly lived to a great age, but the exact year of his death after 1604 is not recorded. Though no known works survive, Hessel Miedema in his more recent edition of the Schilder-boeck wonders whether he isn't the same "Aelbert symonssen" mentioned in a document in the Haarlem archives who was paid 15 florins in 1592–1593 for making several copies of maps of Haarlem after the one by mayor Thomas Thomassen, and who was also paid 25 florins for making one copy of a map made in 1570 of the boundary of Rhineland after Joost Janssen of Amsterdam.
