= Limburg Museum =

Museum in Venlo, Netherlands

Coordinates: 51°22′0″N 6°10′19″E

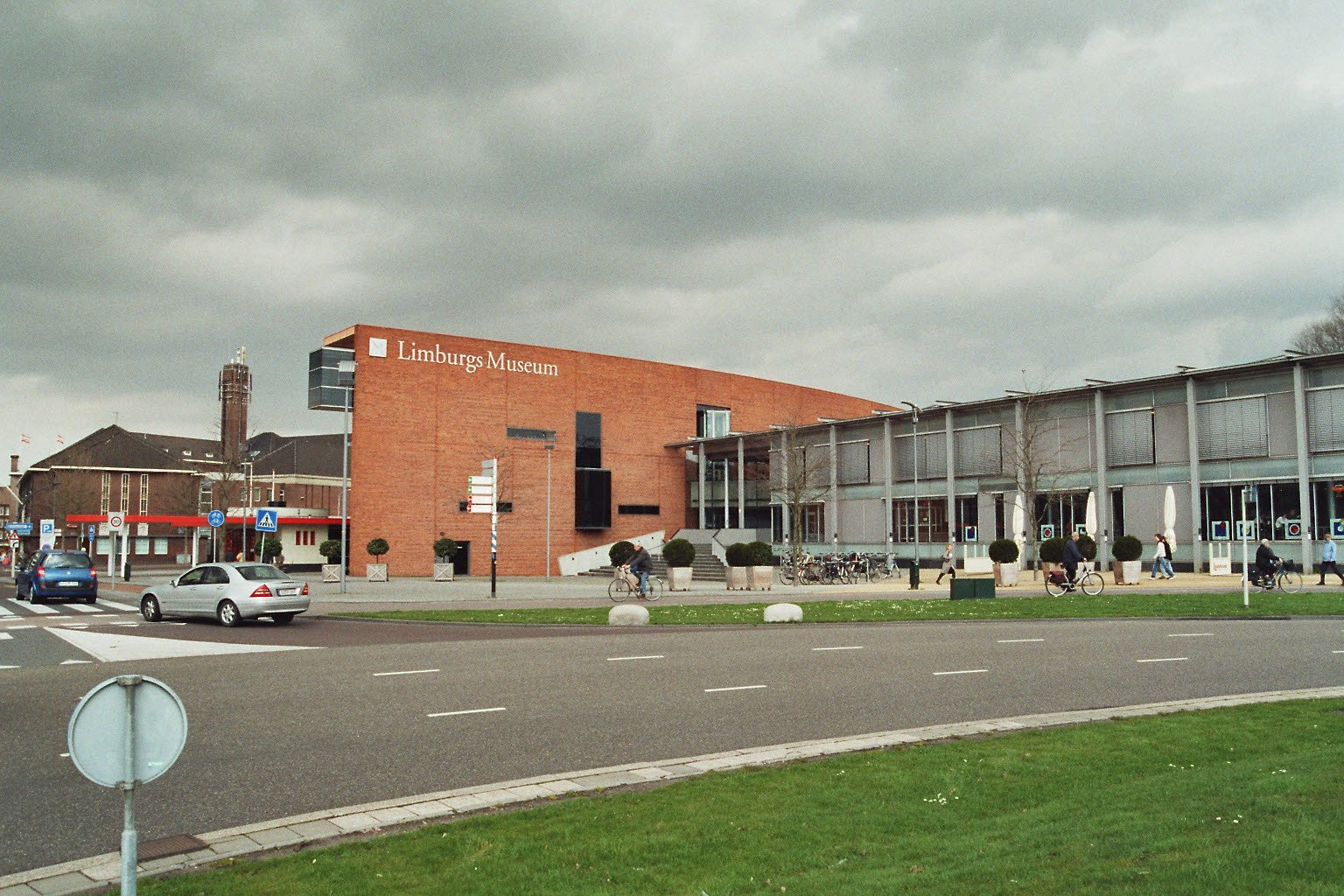
The museum.

The Limburg Museum (Dutch: Limburgs Museum) is a cultural-historical museum in the Julianapark in the Dutch city of Venlo. The Limburg Museum, the Discovery Center Continium in Kerkrade and the Bonnefantenmuseum in Maastricht are the three provincial museums in Limburg.

The museum's collections include archaeological material from the Neolithic onwards and folklore items, including agricultural tools, kitchen utensils, textiles, clothing and objects relating to carnival and popular religious devotion. It mounts a number of special exhibitions each year along with events, activities and historical film showings.

== History ==
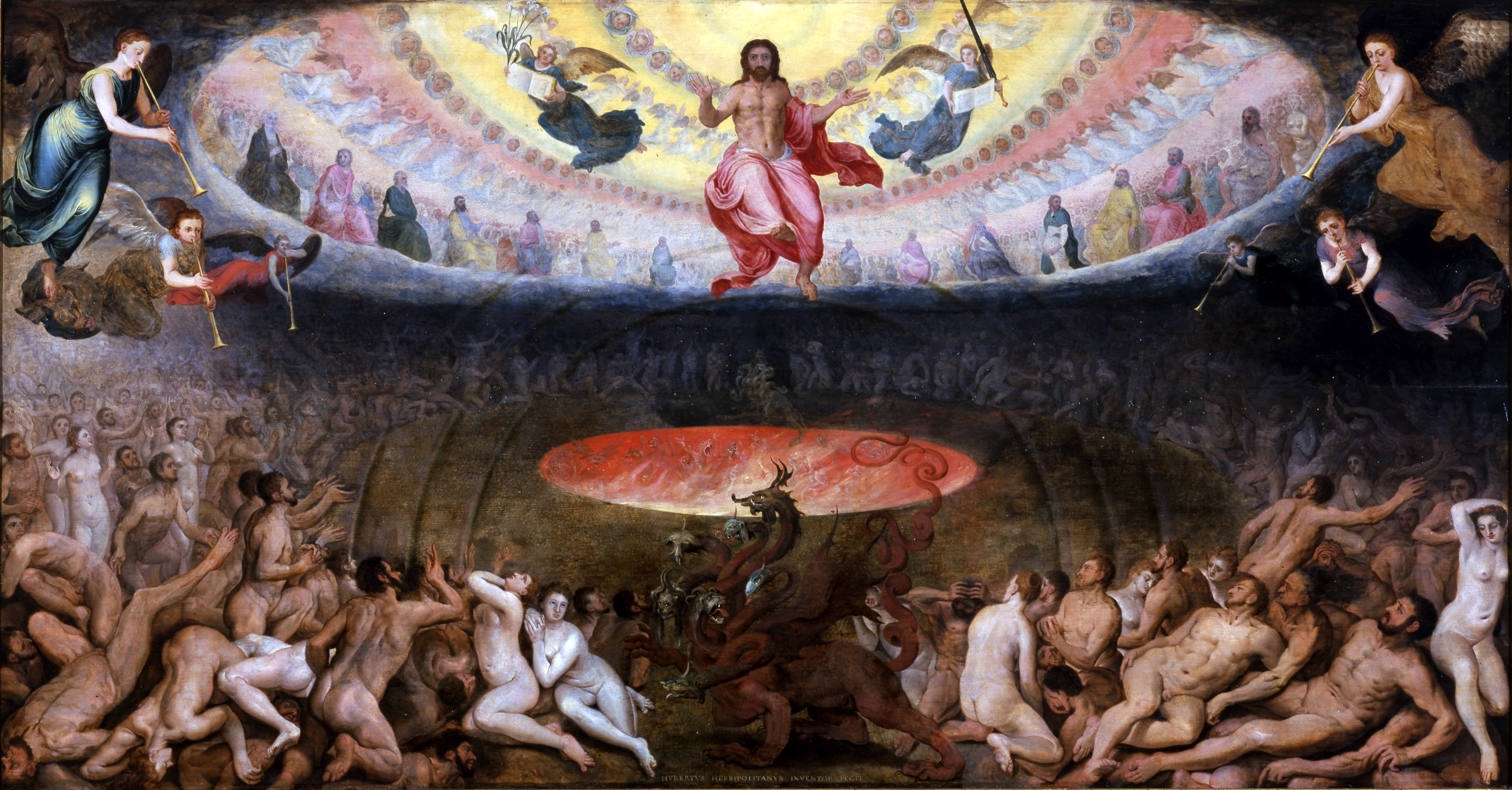
Hubertus Goltzius. The Last Judgement. 1557. Venlo, Limburgs Museum. From Venlo's town hall.

It was established in September 1993 by merging the Goltziusmuseum in Venlo with the Limburg Folk Centre (Limburgs Volkskundig Centrum) in Limbricht.

=== Goltziusmuseum ===
Sited in the Goltziusgebouw building, the Goltziusmuseum was the town museum for Venlo, containing the town's art and historical collections. There were already plans for a "city museum" in 1924, but these were never implemented and so the collection long remained in Venlo's town hall.

Around 1963 the decision was taken to set up the Goltziusmuseum, which was officially opened on 3 June 1967 by Marga Klompé, then the Dutch minister for Culture, Leisure and Social Work.

=== Limburgs Volkskundig Centrum ===
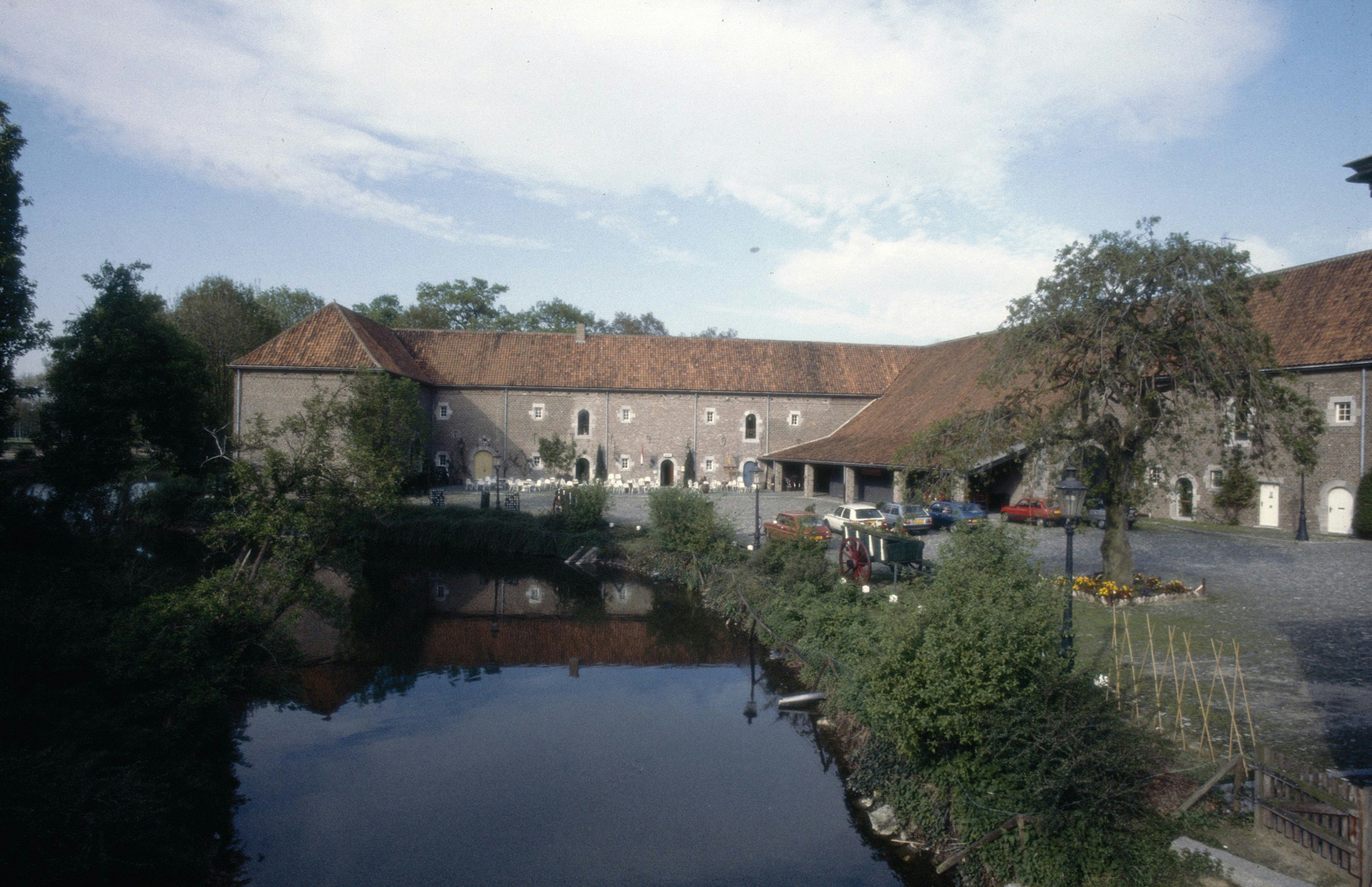
Outer bailey of the Kasteel Limbricht, then the site of the Limburgs Volkskundig Centrum.

The Limburgs Volkskundig Centrum was set up in 1987 by the Gedeputeerde Staten van Limburg and designated as a provincial museum. It represented a merger of the Limburgs Volkskundig Museum, the Limburgs Volkskundig Instituut and the Volkskundige Activiteiten Limburg, a charitable foundation. On 25 June 1984 it moved into a newly-restored Kasteel Limbricht.

The nucleus of its collection was formed by buying the collection of the bankrupt Peelmuseum in Ospel. The Limburgs Volkskundig Instituut was also moved into the Kasteel Limbricht, with its collections including a library bequeathed by the folk-scholar Winand Roukens. The visitor numbers for the Limburgs Volkskundig Centrum proved disappointing, the space too small and the site too poorly connected to local transport. At the end of 1989 plans were made to move it to Venlo and merge it with the Goltziusmuseum and possibly with another Limburg institution.

=== New building ===
In 1993 the Goltziusmuseum and the Limburgs Volkskundig Centrum merged to form the Limburg Museum. The Goltziusgebouw was too small for the combined collection and so before the merger it was decided to create a new building. Designed by Venlo-born architect Jeanne Dekkers, it was only completed in 2000.

In June 2011 construction work began on a new room at the museum and two months later the supposed 13th-century CE mikveh discovered in excavations on Maasboulevard was resited in the museum's basement., although in 2014 the museum announced that the structure was not a mikveh.

== Bibliography ==
- Anoniem (9 oktober 1924) ‘Een stedelijk museum te Venlo’, Het Vaderland, Avondblad B, p. 2.
- Anoniem (24 september 1988) ‘Limburgse volkskunde bundelt zijn krachten’, Limburgs Dagblad, p. 2. Zie delpher.nl.
- Anoniem (6 december 1989) ‘Volkskundig Centrum mogelijk naar Venlo’, Limburgs Dagblad, p. 17. Zie delpher.nl.
- Anoniem (13 maart 1992) ‘Bouw musea gaat door’, Limburgs Dagblad, p. 15. Zie delpher.nl.
- Anoniem (24 juli 1993) ‘Limburgs volkskundig centrum gaat verhuizen’, Limburgs Dagblad, p. 11. Zie delpher.nl.
- Overhof, Servé (17 januari 1987) ‘G.S. erkennen drie ‘provinciale’ musea. Bonnefanten, Mijnmuseum en Volkskundig Centrum’, Limburgs Dagblad, p. 15. Zie delpher.nl.
- Rousseau, Pierre (7 juli 1984) ‘Vele plannen voor een leeg kasteel. Museum moet open centrum voor volkskunde worden’, Limburgs Dagblad, p. 13. Zie delpher.nl.
