= Roswitha Hecke =

German photographer (born 1944)

Roswitha Hecke (born 1944 in Hamburg) is a German photographer and photojournalist. With content ranging from faces to places, her photographic projects explore the unfamiliar and re-examine the familiar.

== Life ==
Hecke wanted to become a photographer from the time she was a teenager. The daughter of a teacher, she had never before held a camera in her hands, but one morning, she woke up one knowing that she needed to take photos. After a three-year apprenticeship as a photographer, Hecke became acquainted with the theatrical director Peter Zadek. During the seven years of their relationship, she photographed Zadek’s theatre productions exclusively. This period was followed by shots of many other stage works and films, including productions by Werner Schroeter, Rainer Werner Fassbinder and, in Paris, of Éric Rohmer.

Hecke lived with the German author and poet Wolfgang Wondratscheck and travelled with him around the United States in the 1970s. They published a book together entitled People, Places, Fists. Hecke has portrayed many artists, actors and musicians, including Omar Sharif, Heinz Bennent, Ingrid Caven and Andrés Segovia.

Hecke regards herself as a modern nomad. She has travelled the world: France, Spain, Italy, Turkey, India, Mexico, Peru, USA, Spain, and Switzerland. In Morocco, she lived in a tent for three years . In 2002, she moved to St. Petersburg, where she taught the Masterclass of Photography at the Art Academy.

At present, Hecke lives in Hamburg. She has two sons, Said and Ivan.

== Art of photography ==
"She never ridicules her models, but she does not glorify them either. Her eye never stops enquiring and thus her photos are honest, sometimes humorous and always unique." (Joachim Sartorius, superintendent of the Berliner Festspiele)

Hecke was first recognised for her black-and-white photography of theatrical scenes and portraits. In the beginning of the 1970s, she switched to photojournalism and colour photography. Her unstaged photographs explore strange and yet often simple worlds and situations. She is a precise, unprejudiced and sensitive observer. Some of her photo-cycles deal with people living on the edge of society: transvestites, homeless people and prostitutes. Her photos are respectful and do not rob her subjects of their dignity. Another one of her favorite topics is the fascination with the human male as such and all the expressions of machismo. Her work was published by numerous renowned German magazines like Stern, Vogue, Twen, Playboy, Theater heute, Die Zeit, Spiegel, and others.

== Awards ==
Her work LoveLife, about the Zurich prostitute Irene, won the 1979 Kodak Prize as best photobook. In 1982, it was awarded the prize as Most beautiful book by the German foundation Stiftung Buchkunst and was published in Norway, the United States and Japan.

== Exhibitions ==
- 1978: Galerie Levy, Hamburg „Liebes Leben“
- 1980: Fotoforum in der Fabrik, Hamburg, Solo "LiebesLeben"
- 1990: Prince Gallery, Kyoto, Solo "LiebesLeben"
- 1990: Olympus Galerie, Hamburg "Mann für Mann"
- 1997: Libro Azul, Ibiza, Spain "LiebesLeben and "Mann für Mann"
- 1998: Kunsthaus Hannover, "Augenlust-erotische Kunst im 20. Jahrhundert"
- 1999: Galerie Levy, Madrid "LiebesLeben"
- Kunsthaus Hannover, "New York City Faces"
- 2002: Contemporary Art Gallery, Basel "Pigalle"
- Speicherstadtmuseum Hamburg, Installation “Secret Views”
- 2003: Kunstclub Hamburg "Hamburg für St. Petersburg - St. Petersburg für Hamburg"
- 2004: NORD/LB art gallery, constant exhibition "Roy Finer"
- Aplanat Galerie für Fotografie, Hamburg "Roy Finer"
- 2005: Galerie Molitoris, Hamburg "The Bennent Family"
- Aplanat Galerie für Fotografie, Hamburg, "Im Dickicht der Fäuste"
- 2006: Ruhrtrienale, Bochum "Oh, mein Zadek", private Photos
- 2007: Academy of Arts, Berlin
- 2007: Witte de With; Rotterdam, group show
- 2007: Martin-Gropius-Bau, Berlin Retrospective "Secret Views" Photos from 1964 to present"
- 2008: Anna Augstein Gallerie. Berlin "TwoSome"
- 2008: Fotomuseum Winterthur, Swiss "Darkside" group show

== Books ==
- Liebes Leben. Bilder mit Irene. Bildband. Rogner & Bernhard, München 1979. ISBN 3-8077-0100-1
- Blott til lyst. bilder med Irene. Sandberg, Oslo 1982, ISBN 82-7316-144-7
- Mann für Mann. Bildband. Rowohlt, Reinbek bei Hamburg 1989, ISBN 3-498-02883-9
- Japanese edition of Liebes Leben. JICC Shuppankyoku. Tokio 1993, ISBN 4-7966-0582-7
- Pigalle. Mit einem Text von Joachim Sartorius. Deutsch und Englisch. König, Köln 2007, ISBN 978-3-86560-162-9
- Secret Views. Fotografien 1964 bis heute. Ausstellungskatalog und Buch. Schirmer Mosel, München 2007, ISBN 978-3-8296-0325-6
