= Senator Heck =

Senator Heck may refer to:

- Homer Heck (1936–2014), West Virginia State Senate
- Joe Heck (born 1961), Nevada State Senate
- Max W. Heck (1869–1938), Wisconsin State Senate
