= Hubert Goltzius =

Renaissance painter and publisher

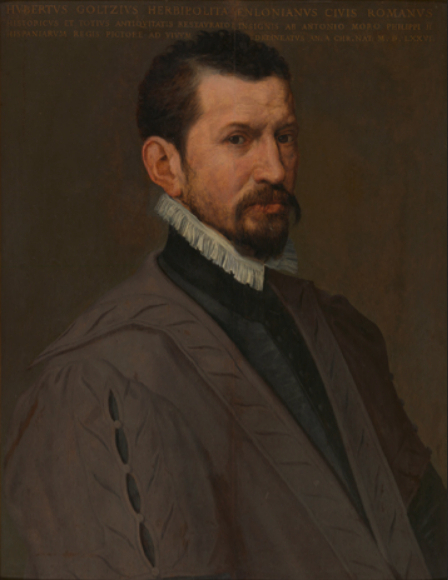
Hubert Goltzius by Anthonis Mor, 1574

Hubert Goltzius or Hubertus Goltzius, latinized form of Hubrecht Goltz or Hubert Goltz (Venlo, 30 October 1526 – Bruges, 24 March 1583) was a Renaissance painter, engraver, publisher, printer and numismatist from the Habsburg Netherlands. He was also active as an art and antique dealer. He was the great-uncle of the now better known engraver and painter Hendrik Goltzius. He is now recognized mainly for his contribution to numismatics and has been referred to as the 'father of ancient numismatics'.

== Life ==
Goltzius was born in Venlo as the son of Rutger van Weertsburg and Catharina Goltzius. His father was an architect and painter originally from Wurzburg. His mother was the daughter of Hubrecht Goltz or Goltzius (the Elder), a painter who was originally from Hinsbeck in Upper Guelders (present-day Germany), a town close to Venlo, also in Upper Guelders (present-day Netherlands) where he had moved in 1494. His father had adopted the name of his wife at their marriage. Hubert was initially trained by his father.

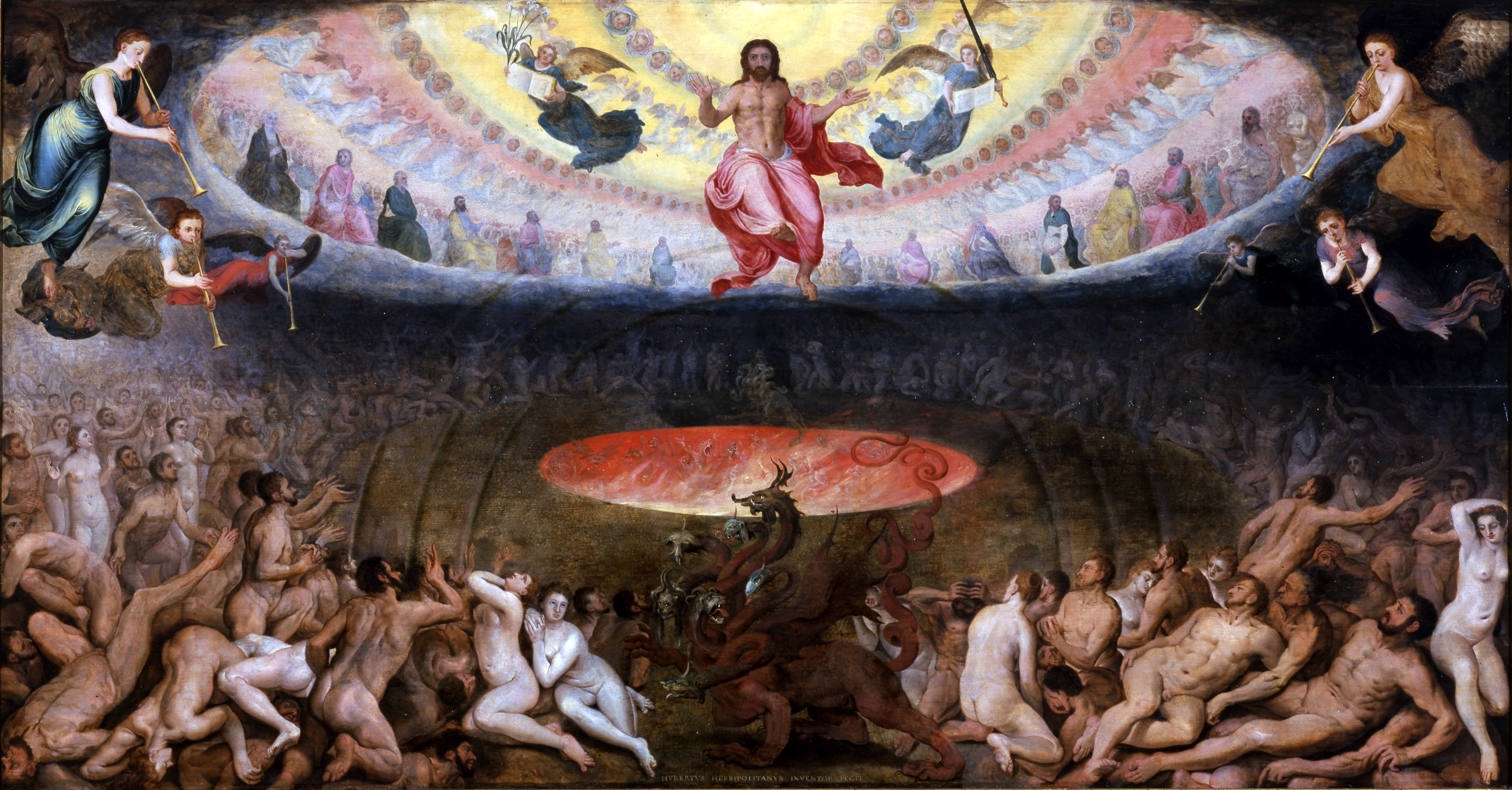
Last Judgement, Limburg Museum, 1557

He was then sent to Liège where from 1544 to 1546 he studied painting and engraving at the academy operated by the prominent humanist and painter Lambert Lombard. In addition to being a painter, architect, printmaker and writer, Lombard was an avid coin collector, an activity he had likely started while residing in Rome. It was Lombard who introduced Goltzius to coin collecting and numismatics and thought him printmaking. In his preface to the reader (“Ad Lectorem Praefatio”) of the Vivae omnium fere imperatorum Imagines, a C. Iulio Caes. usque ad Carolum .V. et Ferdinandum eius fratrem, Goltzius describes his apprenticeship with Lombard. He praised his master for his dedication to learning from older masters by making drawings after pictures and wall paintings by earlier German artists. During his apprenticeship with Lombard, Goltzius studied the historical writings and relics from Antiquity, in particular coins. In 1565, he would assist Dominicus Lampsonius with the editing and publishing of his Lamberti Lombardi apvd Ebvrones pictoris celeberrimi vita, a panegyric on Lombard that praises his vast learning, role in educating a generation of Netherlandish artists and early promotion of printmaking in Northern Europe.

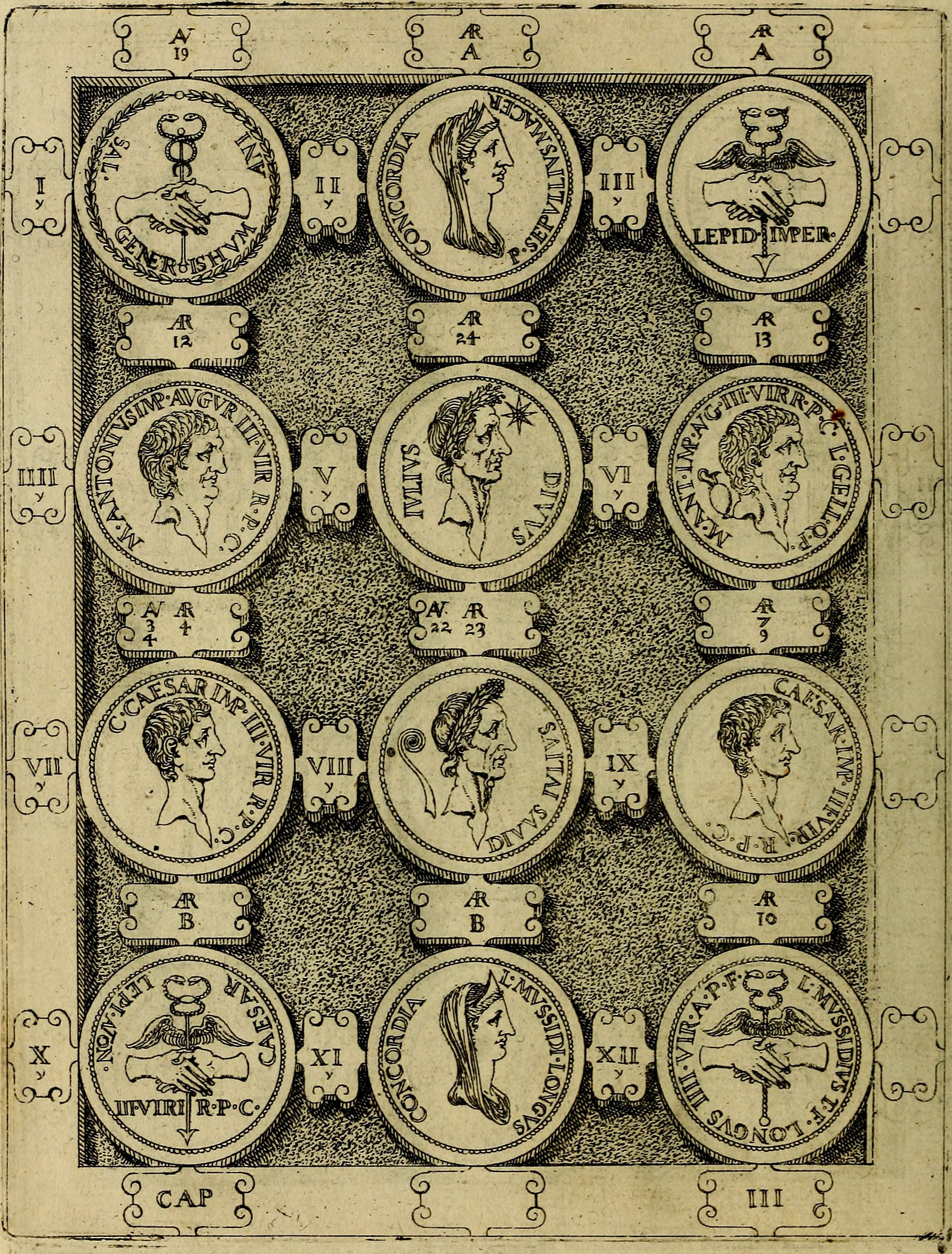
C. Ivlivs Caesar - sive Historiae imperatorvm Caesarvmqve romanorvm ex antiqvis nvmismatibvs restitvtae liber primvs; accessit C. Ivlii Caesaris vita et res gestae (1563)

From 1548 he was in Antwerp where he married Lysbeth (Elisabeth) Verhulst. His wife was the daughter of a painter from Mechelen and the sister of Mayken Verhulst and Barbara Verhulst, who were respectively married to the painters Pieter Coecke van Aelst and Jacob de Punder. A daughter of Mayken Verhulst and Pieter Coecke van Aelst, also called Mayken, would later marry the famous Flemish painter Pieter Bruegel the Elder. Goltzius would occasionally collaborate on commissions with his brother-in-law Jacob de Punder. Through his marriage he had become connected to very important artists active in Flanders in the period. The family had four sons: Marcel became an apothecary, Scipio a draughtsman and painter (only one known painting of Fruit and Vegetable Vendors, Museum of Fine Arts, Boston), Julius an engraver at the Officina Plantiniana printing house in Antwerp and Aurelius whose job description is unknown. The first names of the sons were those of Roman rulers. There were also three daughters.

He must have been active as a painter in his early years in Antwerp. On 28 September 1551 he testified that two years before he had delivered to Elisabeth Borremans, wife of the painter Jan van Sevenhoven, 8 paintings of which four scenes, respectively of a Cleopatra, an Ecce Homo, an Our Lord on the Cross and a Christmas Night. He also testified that he had supplied four canvases representing respectively Adam and Eve, an Ecce Homo, the Carrying of the Cross and Lucretia. He painted a Last Judgement for the tribunal of the city hall of Venlo in 1557 (now in the Limburg Museum). He also painted some scenes on the occasion of festivities celebrated in Antwerp such as the meeting of a chapter of the Golden Fleece.

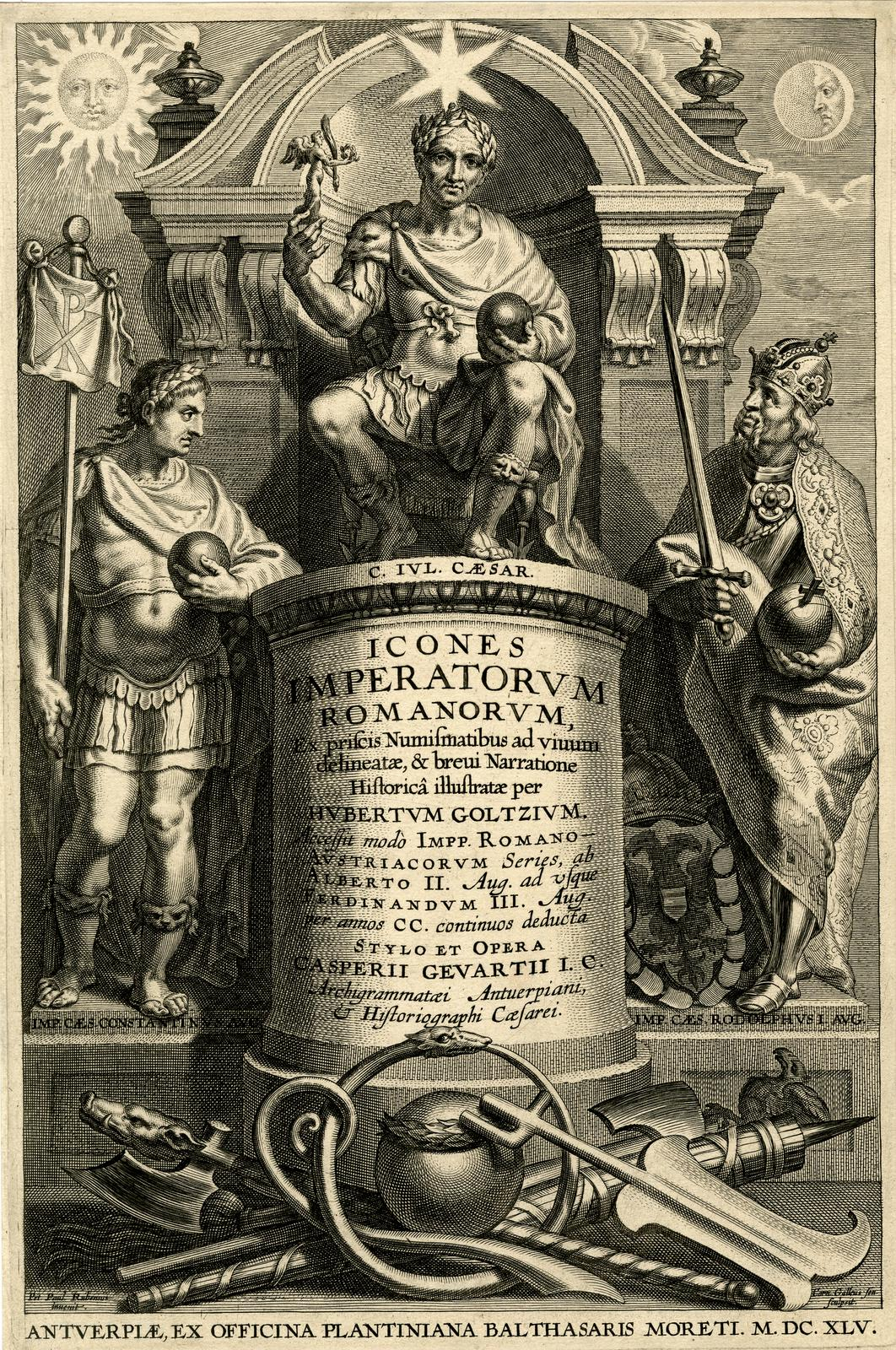
Frontispiece of the Icones Imperatorum Romanorum after a design by Rubens, 1645

Goltzius also started to deal in art and antiquities, in particular in coins. This he did on occasion in partnership with Abraham Ortelius, the famous geographer who was also a dealer in antiques. At the time, collecting ancient coins had become fashionable, as the cost and relatively large quantity of coins available put this activity within the financial reach of the professional and trading classes of the time. It was Ortelius who put Goltzius in touch with the man who could fund his project to publish a series of books with as subject the reverse sides of Roman coins: Marcus Laurinus (Lauweryn) (1530-1581), the lord of Watervliet and brother of the eminent classicist Guido Laurinus. Marcus first commissioned Goltzius to draw his personal numismatic collection. He then sent the artist on a study trip to make drawings in Europe's most important antiquities collections, with which Laurinus could supplement his own collection. Hubert Goltzius made two trips, one of two months in 1556, another of two years in 1558-1560, during which he visited 978 coin collections in 120 cities. In the Southern Netherlands alone, he reported no less than 119 collections. Goltzius had his own printshop in Bruges. In 1566, Goltzius published his most influential book, the Fasti magistratuum ettriumphorum Romanorum, in which he gave a chronological overview of the history of Rome, from its foundation to the death of Emperor Augustus, based on coins and marble inscriptions. Goltzius dedicated this book to the Roman Senate and received the honorary title of Roman citizen or Civis romanus as a token of gratitude. He made a trip to Germany in 1570.

His portrait was painted twice by the eminent portrait painter Antonis Mor in exchange for his book on medals. Melchior Lorck also made an engraved portrait which was used in his last book of 1576 and also independently.

He died in Bruges. When he died he left a lot of unpublished manuscripts. The engraver and numismatist Jacob de Bie worked during the years 1617 to 1620 on compiling the first collections of these works. The Plantin Press of Antwerp published his Opera Omnia in 1644-1645 in five volumes, with a frontispiece engraved by Cornelis Galle the Elder after a design by Rubens, who was an avid collector of ancient medals. The Verdussen printing press in Antwerp reprinted in 1708 the Plantin edition to which was added extensive commentary.
