= Jacob de Punder =

Flemish painter

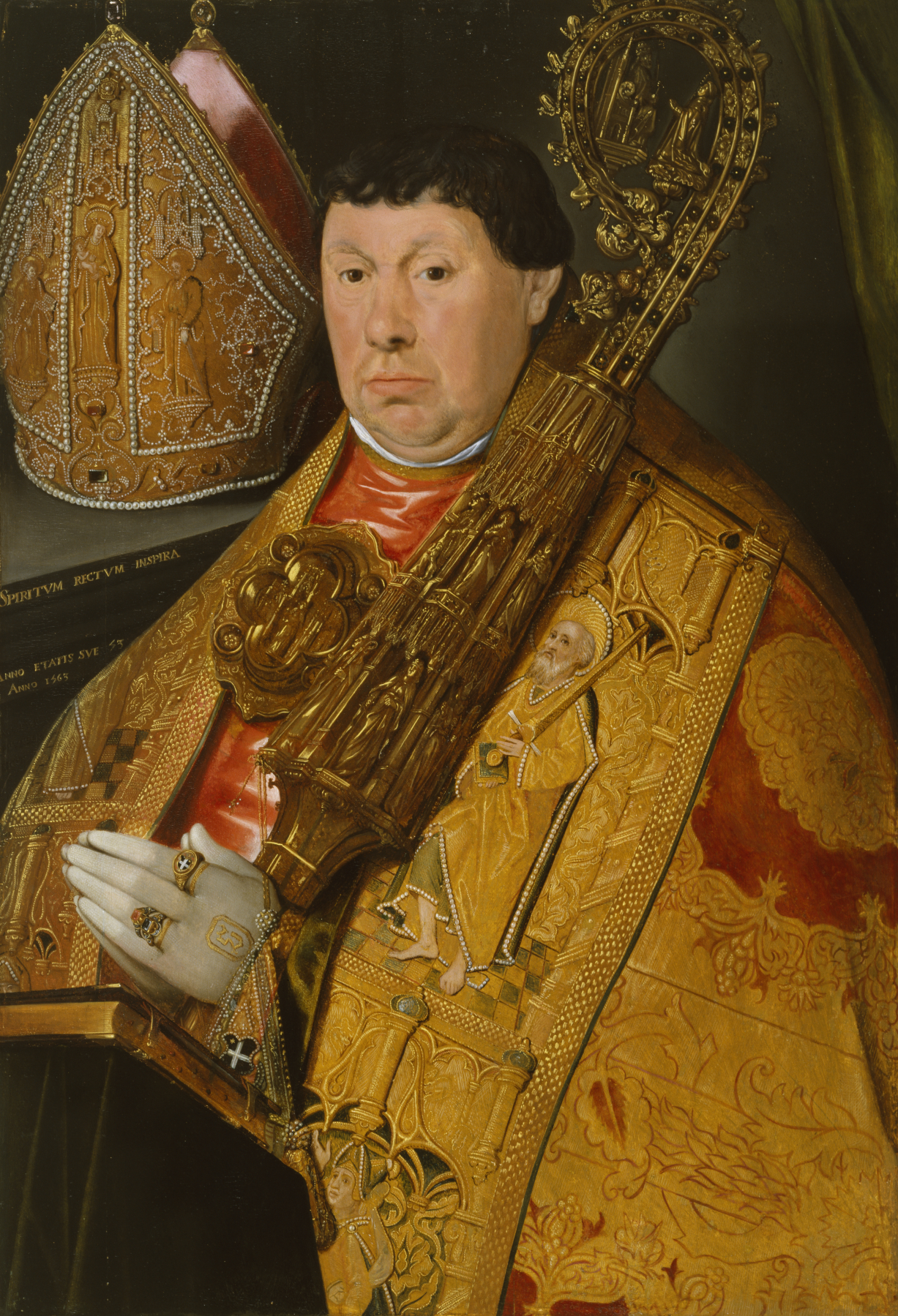
Portrait of Nicholas à Spira

Jacob de Punder or Jacques de Punder (1527 – c.1570), was a Flemish Renaissance painter mainly known for his portrait paintings.

== Biography ==
Jacob de Punder was born in Mechelen. The early Flemish biographer Karel van Mander states in the Schilder-boeck (1604) that de Punder was in Mechelen the pupil of the painter Marcus Willems (1527–1561). Willems had been a disciple of Michiel Coxie, one of the leading Romanist painters in Flanders who had helped introduce Italian Renaissance painting there. Willems married de Punder's sister Katharina.

De Punder married Barbara (Barbel) Verhulst. She was the sister of Lysbeth Verhulst, the first wife of the painter and engraver Hubert Goltzius. De Punder and Goltzius would occasionally collaborate on commissions.

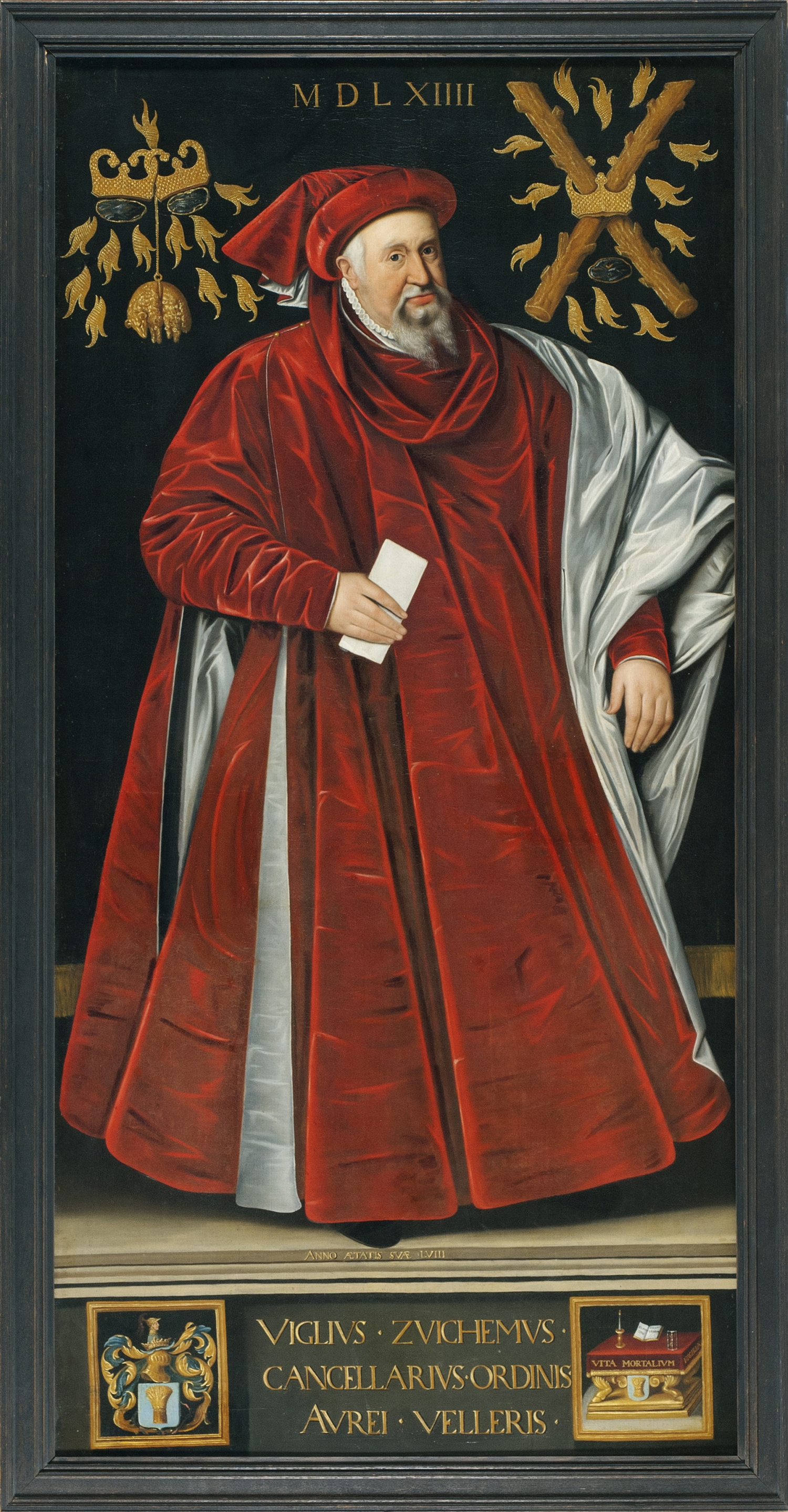
Portrait of Viglius of Aytta

De Punder was in 1559 the master of a certain Willem de Vos in Mechelen. He worked in Leipzig in 1570 before moving to Denmark, where he later died.

== Work ==
Van Mander describes de Punder as a skilled portrait painter. Only three paintings are currently attributed to Jacob de Punder, all three portraits.

The Walters Art Museum holds a pair of portraits dated 1543: one a Portrait of Abbot Nicholas à Spira and the other a Portrait of Saint Nicholas. On the backs of the panels are remnants of an Annunciation scene, with Gabriel on one panel and the Virgin on the other. The panels were originally part of an altarpiece, with the Annunciation forming a unified scene on the exterior of the wings when the altarpiece was closed. The panels flanked a lost central painting, perhaps a Madonna and Child. The altarpiece was commissioned by Nicholas à Spira (1510–1568) who was the abbot of the abbey of the Norbertine Order in Grimbergen in Flanders. Depicting the saintly bishop Saint Nicholas together with his namesake the living abbot in similar ecclesiastical vestments confers dignity upon the latter. The altarpiece was placed in the abbey. While the abbey was destroyed in 1566 during the Iconoclastic fury of the Beeldenstorm, the altarpiece survived. During the anticlerical campaigns of the 1790s following the French Revolution, the altarpiece was apparently dismantled, possibly to separate the portraits from the central panel, which was very likely destroyed.

The Fries Museum holds a Portrait of Viglius of Aytta dated 1564 which is attributed to de Punder. It depicts the Dutch statesman and jurist Viglius as chancellor of the Order of the Golden Fleece.

A Portrait of Emmanuel Philibert, Duke of Savoy by Jacob de Punder (referred to as 'Jaques Pindar') was in the collection of John Lumley, 1st Baron Lumley according to the Lumley inventories. This painting is now untraced.
