= Marten Heemskerck van der Heck =

Dutch painter

Marten Heemskerck van der Heck (1620, Alkmaar – 1660, Alkmaar), was a Dutch Golden Age painter.

== Biography ==
According to Houbraken he was the son of Nicolaes van der Heck, and the nephew of Maerten van Heemskerck, after whom he was named. He became a member of the Alkmaar Guild of St. Luke in 1653 and became regent the next year. He was specialized in painting ruins in the manner of Roelant Roghman, and painted the ruins of Egmond Castle and also Egmond Abbey.

According to the RKD he was the son of Claes Dirksz van der Heck, member of the guild, and known for landscapes and interiors.
