= Hessel Miedema =

Dutch art historian (1929–2019)

Hessel Miedema (21 January 1929, Sneek – 14 April 2019) was a leading Dutch art historian and the world authority on Karel van Mander.

== Biography ==
He was born in Sneek, but grew up in Amsterdam, where he studied art history at the University of Amsterdam. After his studies in 1957 he became curator of the Princessehof Ceramics Museum in Leeuwarden. In 1963 he returned to Amsterdam to write his dissertation on Karel van Mander. Though best known for his (Dutch and English) work on Van Mander, he is also an artist and linguistics expert who has written poems and stories in his native Frisian. He wrote the poem De greate wrakseling with illustrations by his own hand in West Frisian in 1964 about a sculptor who fights for innovation against the strict structures of musea. The sculptor realizes at a certain point that he has forgotten to knock his art to pieces.

== Select bibliography ==
- The lives of the illustrious Netherlandish and German painters, from the first edition of the Schilder-boeck (1603-1604), preceded by the lineage, circumstances and place of birth, life and ..., from the second edition of the Schilder-boeck (1616-1618), 1994-1997 (Massive publication in 6 volumes; Volume 1 is the facsimile version of the original; volumes 2-5 are commentary volumes, and volume 6 is the cross-reference)
- Karel van Manders leven der moderne, oft dees-tijtsche doorluchtighe Italiaensche schilders en hun bron : een vergelijking tussen van Mander en Vasari, 1984
- Kunst, kunstenaar en kunstwerk bij Karel Van Mander : een analyse van zijn levensbeschrijvingen, 1981
- Miedema, Hessel. "Over de betrouwbaarheid van Karel van Mander". Colloquium Neerlandicum 11 (1991). Amsterdam.
- De Archiefbescheiden van het St. Lukasgilde te Haarlem 1497-1798, 1980, ISBN 90-6469-584-9
- Denkbeeldig schoon: Lambert ten Kate, opvattingen over beeldende kunst, 2007 ISBN 90-5997-035-7
- Op 'e literaire toer (in Friesian), 1973, Bolswert Koperative Utjowerij (Republished in 2010, ISBN 90-8954-169-1)
