= Janissary =

Elite infantry units and standing army of the Ottoman Empire (active 1363–1826)

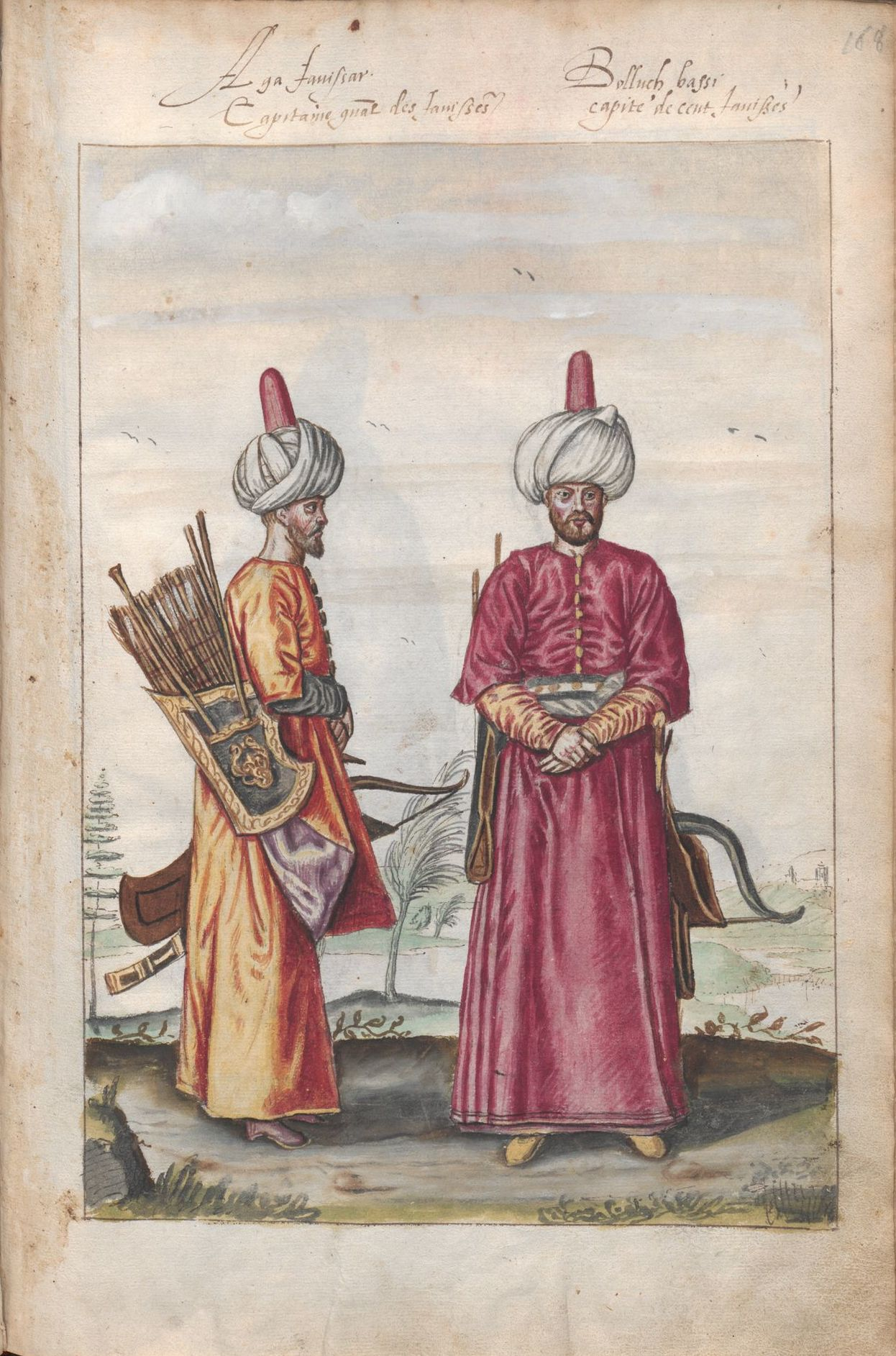
- Agha of the Janissaries and a Bölük of the Janissaries by Lambert Wyts, 1573
- Founded: 28 June 1363
- Disbanded: 15 June 1826
- Allegiance: Ottoman Empire
- Type: Infantry
- Role: Standing professional military
- Size: 1,000 (1400); 7,841 (1484); 13,599 (1574); 37,627 (1609); 135,000 (1826)
- Part of: Ottoman army
- Garrisons: Adrianople; Constantinople
- Patron: Haji Bektash Veli
- Colors: Blue, red, and green
- Equipment: Various
- Engagements: Battle of Kosovo, Battle of Nicopolis, Battle of Ankara, Battle of Varna, Fall of Constantinople, Battle of Chaldiran, Battle of Mohács, Siege of Vienna, Great Siege of Malta, and others

Commanders
- Commander: Agha of the Janissaries

A janissary (UK: /ˈdʒænɪsəri/ JAN-iss-ər-ee, US: /-sɛri/ -err-ee; Ottoman Turkish: یڭیچری, romanized: yeñiçeri, IPA: [jeˈɲit͡ʃeɾ̞i], lit. 'new soldier') was a member of the elite infantry units that formed the Ottoman sultan's household troops. They were one of the first modern standing armies, and perhaps the first infantry force in the world to be equipped primarily with firearms, adopted during the reign of Murad II (r. 1421–1444, 1446–1451). The corps was established under either Orhan or Murad I, and dismantled by Mahmud II in 1826.

Janissaries began as an elite corps made up through the devşirme system of child levy enslavement, by which Christian boys, chiefly from the Balkans, were taken, levied, subjected to forced circumcision and forced conversion to Islam, and incorporated into the Ottoman army. They became famed for internal cohesion cemented by strict discipline and order. Unlike typical slaves, they were paid regular salaries. Forbidden to marry until retirement (typically in their 40s) or engage in trade, their complete loyalty to the Ottoman sultan was expected. By the 17th century, due to a dramatic increase in the size of the Ottoman standing army, the corps' initially strict recruitment policy was relaxed. Civilians bought their way into it in order to benefit from the improved socio-economic status it conferred upon them. Consequently, the corps gradually lost its military character, undergoing a process that has been described as "civilianization".

The Janissary Corps were a formidable military unit in the early centuries, but as Western Europe modernized its military organization and technology, the Janissaries became a reactionary force that resisted all change within the Ottoman army. Steadily the Ottoman military power became outdated, but when the Janissaries felt their privileges were being threatened, or outsiders wanted to modernize them, or they might be superseded by their cavalry rivals, they would rise in rebellion. By the time the Janissaries were suppressed, it was too late for Ottoman military power to catch up with the West. The Janissary Corps was abolished by Mahmud II in 1826 in the Auspicious Incident, in which 6,000 or more Janissaries were executed.

== Origins and history ==
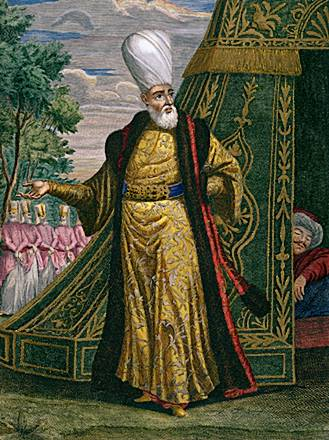
Agha of the Janissaries, commander of the Janissary Corps, in 1768

The Janissary Corps was formed in the 14th century, either during the rule of Murad I (r. 1362–1389), the third sultan of the Ottoman Empire, or during the time of Murad's father, Orhan (r. c. 1324 – 1362). The Ottoman government instituted a tax of one-fifth on all slaves taken in war, and from this pool of manpower the sultans first constructed the Janissary corps as a personal army loyal only to the Ottoman sultan.

From the 1380s to 1648, the Janissaries were gathered through the devşirme system of child levy enslavement, which was abolished in 1648. This recruitment of Janissary troops was achieved through the enslaving of dhimmi peoples (i.e., non-Muslims), predominantly Balkan Christians. Jews were never subject to devşirme; however, there is evidence that Jews tried to enroll into the system. Jews were not allowed to join the Janissary Corps, and so in suspected cases the entire batch would be sent to the Imperial Arsenal as indentured laborers. Ottoman documents from the levy of the winter of 1603–1604 from Bosnia and Albania wrote to draw attention to some children as "possibly being Jewish" (şekine-i arz-ı yahudi). According to the Encyclopedia Britannica, "in early days, all Christians were enrolled indiscriminately. Later, those from what is now Albania, Bosnia, Serbia, Greece, Bulgaria and Hungary were preferred." The Bektashi Order became the official religious and spiritual institution of the Janissaries in the 15th century.

The Janissaries were kapıkulları (sing. kapıkulu), "door servants" or "slaves of the Porte", neither freedmen nor ordinary slaves (köle). They were subjected to strict discipline, but were paid salaries and pensions upon retirement and formed their own distinctive social class. As such, they became one of the ruling classes of the Ottoman Empire, rivalling the Ottoman Turkish aristocracy. The brightest of the Janissaries were sent to the palace institution, Enderun. Through a system of meritocracy, the Janissaries held enormous power, stopping all efforts to reform the military.

According to military historian Michael Antonucci and economic historians Glenn Hubbard and Tim Kane, the Turkish administrators would scour their provinces (but especially the Balkans) every five years for the strongest sons of the European Christians. When a non-Muslim boy was recruited under the devşirme system of child levy enslavement, he would first be sent to selected Ottoman Turkish families in the provinces to learn Turkish, subjected to forced circumcision and forced conversion to Islam, and to learn the customs and culture of Ottoman society. After completing this period, acemi ("new recruit") boys were gathered for training at the Enderun acemi oğlan ("rookie" or "cadet") school in the capital city. There, young cadets would be selected for their talents in different areas to train as engineers, artisans, riflemen, clerics, archers, artillery, and so forth. Most were of non-Muslim origin because it was not permissible to enslave other Muslims.

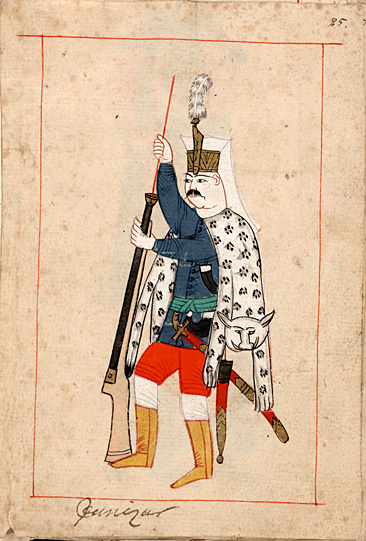
Portrait of a Janissary with a firearm (before 1657)

It was a similar system to the Iranian Safavid, Afsharid, and Qajar-era ghilman, who were drawn from converted Circassians, Georgians, and Armenians, and in the same way as with the Ottoman Janissaries, who had to replace the unreliable ghazi. They were initially created as a counterbalance to the tribal, ethnic, and favoured interests the Qizilbash gave, which make a system imbalanced.

In the late 16th century, a sultan gave in to the pressures of the Corps and permitted Janissary children to become members of the Corps, a practice strictly forbidden for the previous 300 years. According to paintings of the era, they were also permitted to grow beards. Consequently, the formerly strict rules of succession became open to interpretation. While they advanced their own power, the Janissaries also helped to keep the system from changing in other progressive ways, and according to some scholars the corps shared responsibility for the political stagnation of Istanbul.

Greek historian Dimitri Kitsikis in his book Türk Yunan İmparatorluğu ("Turco-Greek Empire") states that many Bosnian Christian families were willing to comply with the devşirme because it offered a possibility of social advancement. Conscripts could one day become Janissary colonels, statesmen who might one day return to their home region as governors, or even Grand Viziers or beylerbey ("governor generals"). Some of the most famous Janissaries include George Kastrioti Skanderbeg, an Albanian feudal lord who defected and led a 25‑year Albanian revolt against the Ottomans. Another was Sokollu Mehmed Paşa, a Bosnian Serb who became a Grand Vizier, served three sultans, and was the de facto ruler of the Ottoman Empire for more than 14 years.

== Characteristics ==
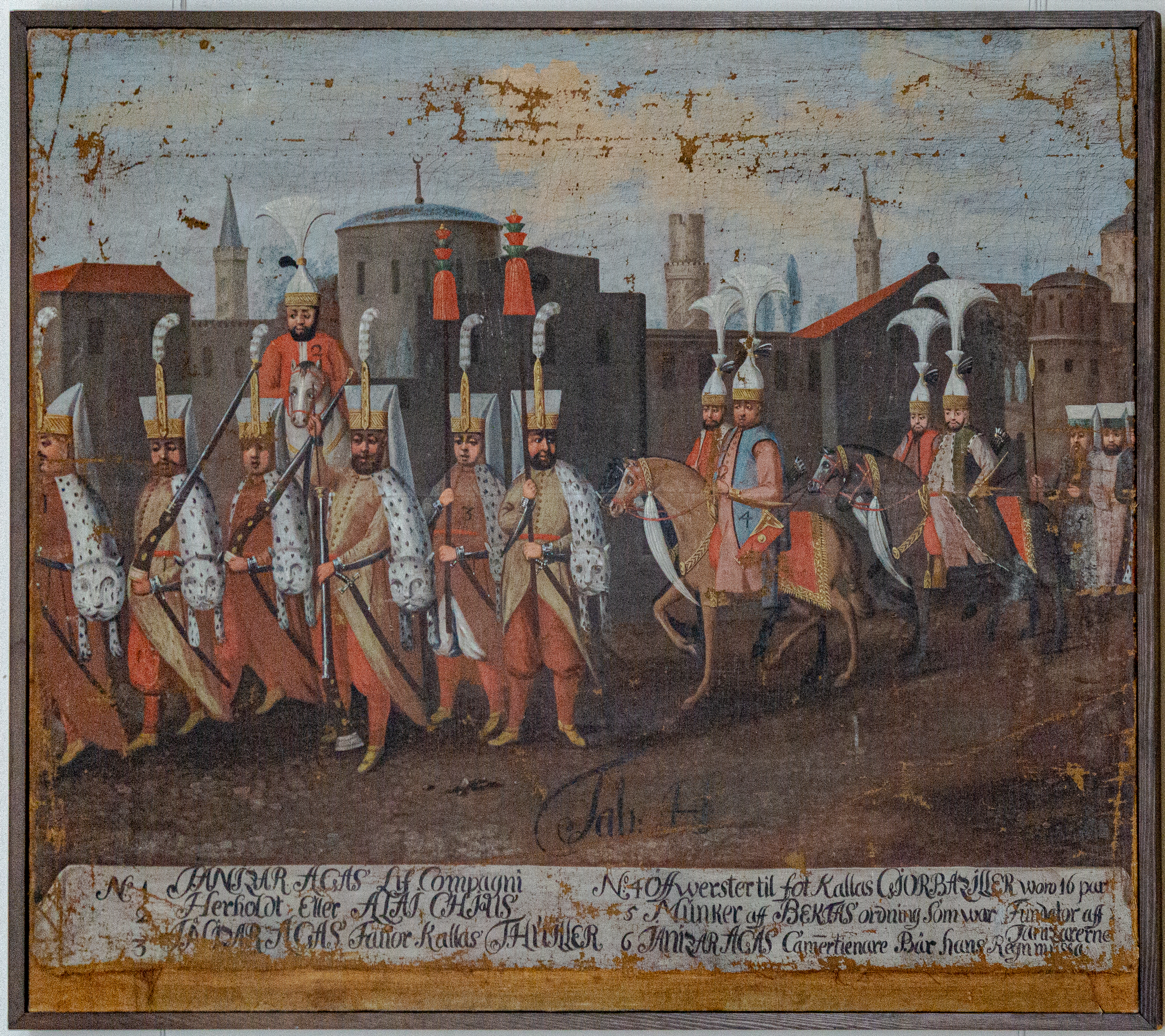
The Janissary Agha leading the corps, 1658.

The Janissary corps was distinctive in a number of ways. They wore unique uniforms, were paid regular salaries (including bonuses) for their service, marched to music (the mehter), lived in barracks, and were the first military corps to make extensive use of firearms. A Janissary battalion was a close-knit community, effectively the soldier's family. By tradition, the Ottoman sultan himself, after authorizing the payments to the Janissaries, visited the barracks dressed as a Janissary trooper, and received his pay alongside the other men of the First Division. They also served as policemen, palace guards, and firefighters during peacetime. The Janissaries also enjoyed far better support on campaign than the other armies of the time. They were part of a well-organized military machine, in which one support corps prepared the roads while others pitched tents and baked the bread. Their weapons and ammunition were transported and re-supplied by the cebeci corps. They campaigned with their own medical teams of Muslim and Jewish surgeons and their sick and wounded were evacuated to dedicated mobile hospitals set up behind the lines. By the mid-18th century, they had taken up many trades and gained the right to marry and enroll their children in the corps and very few continued to live in the barracks. Many of them became administrators and scholars in other branches of government service.

== Recruitment, training, and status ==
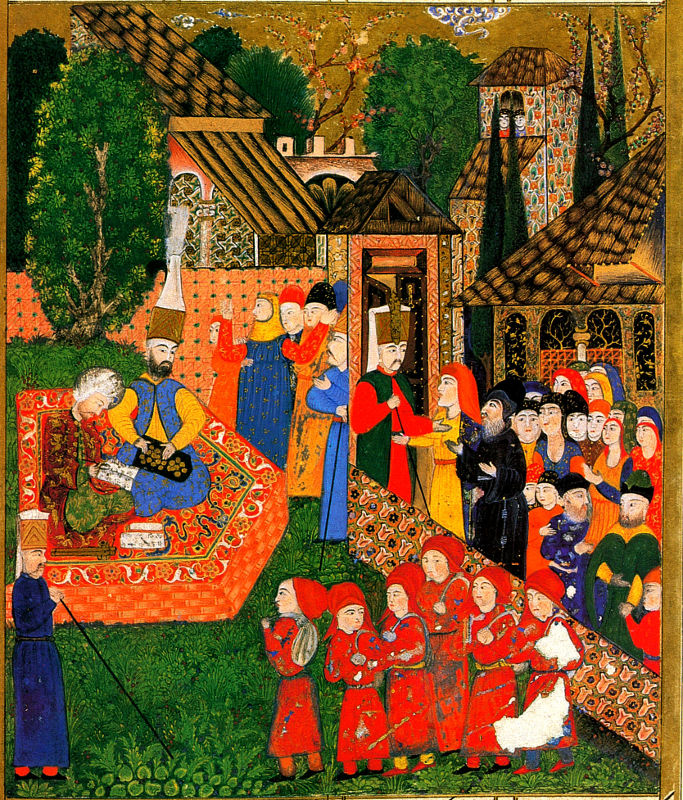
Registration of Christian boys for the tribute in blood, Süleymannâme, 1558

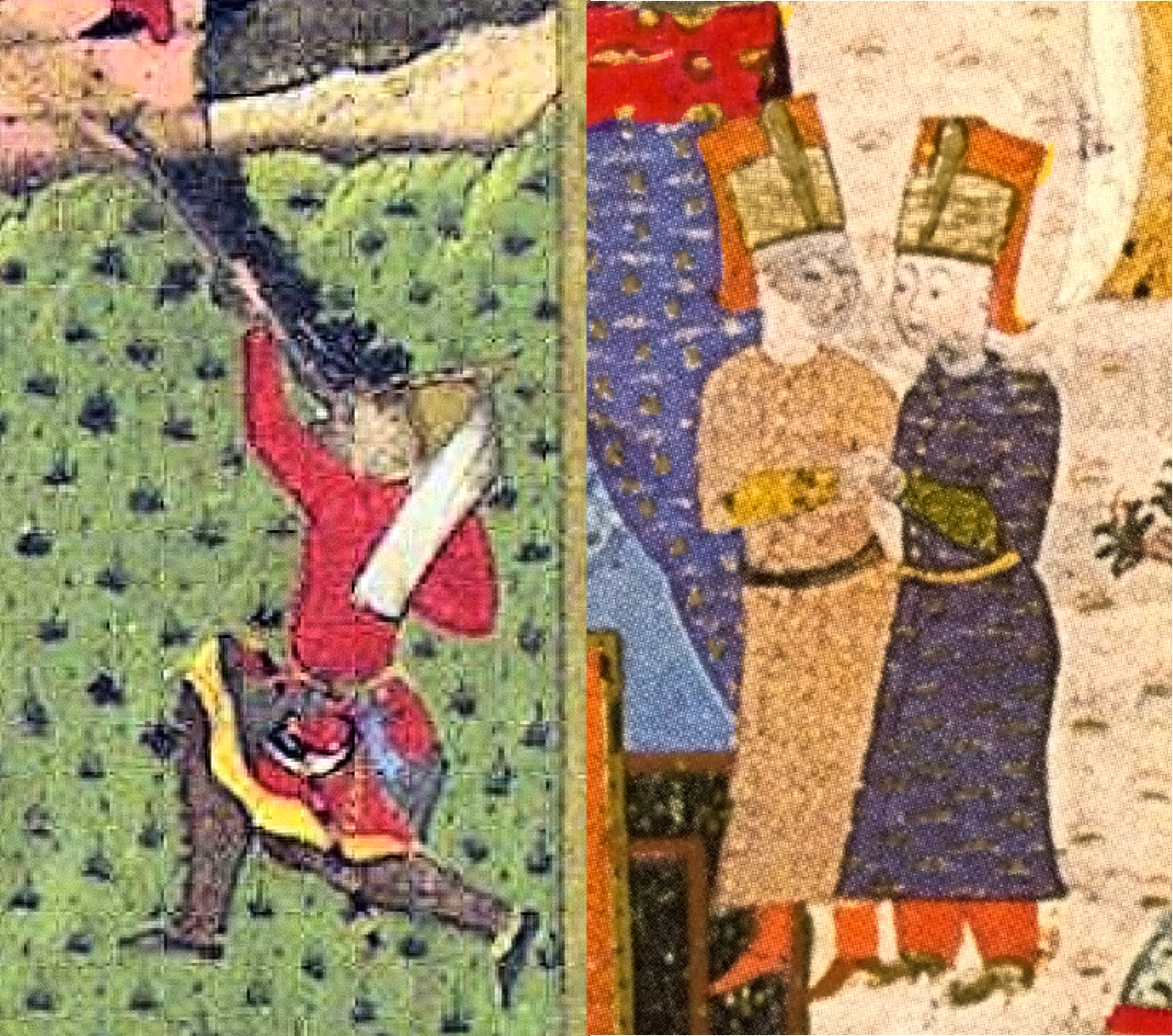
Ottoman Janissaries in 1558, Futūhāt-i jamīla, 1592

The first Janissary units were formed from prisoners of war and slaves, probably as a result of the sultan taking his traditional one-fifth share of his army's plunder in kind rather than monetarily; however, the continuing exploitation and enslavement of dhimmi peoples (i.e., non-Muslims), predominantly Balkan Christians, constituted a continuing abuse of subject populations. For a while, the Ottoman government supplied the Janissary Corps with recruits from the devşirme system of child levy enslavement. Children were drafted at a young age and soon turned into slave-soldiers in an attempt to make them loyal to the Ottoman sultan. The social status of devşirme recruits took on an immediate positive change, acquiring a greater guarantee of governmental rights and financial opportunities. In poor areas officials were bribed by parents to make them take their sons, thus they would have better chances in life. Initially, the Ottoman recruiters favoured Greeks and Albanians. The Ottoman Empire began its expansion into Europe by invading the European portions of the Byzantine Empire in the 14th and 15th centuries up until the capture of Constantinople in 1453, establishing Islam as the state religion of the newly-founded empire. The Ottoman Turks further expanded into Southeastern Europe and consolidated their political power by invading and conquering huge portions of the Serbian Empire, Bulgarian Empire, and the remaining territories of the Byzantine Empire in the 14th and 15th centuries. As borders of the Ottoman Empire expanded, the devşirme system of child levy enslavement was extended to include Armenians, Bulgarians, Croats, Hungarians, Romanians, Serbs, Ukrainians, and later Bosniaks, and, in rare instances, Circassians, Georgians, Poles, and southern Russians.

The slave trade in the Ottoman Empire supplied the ranks of the Ottoman army between the 15th and 19th centuries. They were useful in preventing both the slave rebellions and the breakup of the Empire itself, especially due to the rising tide of nationalism among European peoples in its Balkan provinces from the 17th century onwards. Along with the Balkans, the Black Sea Region remained a significant source of high-value slaves for the Ottomans. Throughout the 16th to 19th centuries, the Barbary States sent pirates to raid nearby parts of Europe in order to capture Christian slaves to sell at slave markets in the Muslim world, primarily in North Africa and the Ottoman Empire, throughout the Renaissance and early modern period. According to historian Robert Davis, from the 16th to 19th centuries, Barbary pirates captured 1 million to 1.25 million Europeans as slaves, although these numbers are disputed. These slaves were captured mainly from the crews of captured vessels, from coastal villages in Spain and Portugal, and from farther places like the Italian Peninsula, France, or England, the Netherlands, Ireland, the Azores Islands, and even Iceland. For a long time, until the early 18th century, the Crimean Khanate maintained a massive slave trade with the Ottoman Empire and the Middle East. The Crimean Tatars frequently mounted raids into the Danubian Principalities, Poland–Lithuania, and Russia to enslave people whom they could capture.

Apart from the effect of a lengthy period under Ottoman domination, many of the subject populations were periodically and forcefully converted to Islam as a result of a deliberate move by the Ottoman Turks as part of a policy of ensuring the loyalty of the population against a potential Venetian invasion. However, Islam was spread by force in the areas under the control of the Ottoman sultan through the devşirme system of child levy enslavement, by which Christian boys from the Balkans (predominantly Albanians, Bulgarians, Croats, Greeks, Romanians, Serbs, and Ukrainians) were taken, levied, subjected to forced circumcision and forced conversion to Islam, and incorporated into the Ottoman army, and jizya taxes. Radushev states that the recruitment system based on child levy can be bisected into two periods: its first, or classical period, encompassing those first two centuries of regular execution and utilization to supply recruits; and a second, or modern period, which more focuses on its gradual change, decline, and ultimate abandonment, beginning in the 17th century.

In response to foreign threats, the Ottoman government chose to rapidly expand the size of the corps after the 1570s. Janissaries spent shorter periods of time in training as acemi oğlan, as the average age of recruitment increased from 13.5 in the 1490s to 16.6 in 1603. This reflected not only the Ottomans' greater need for manpower but also the shorter training time necessary to produce skilled musketeers in comparison with archers. However, this change alone was not enough to produce the necessary manpower, and consequently the traditional limitation of recruitment to boys conscripted in the devşirme was lifted. Membership was opened up to free-born Muslims, both recruits hand-picked by the commander of the Janissaries, as well as the sons of current members of the Ottoman standing army. By the middle of the seventeenth century, the devşirme had largely been abandoned as a method of recruitment. The prescribed daily rate of pay for entry-level Janissaries in the time of Ahmet I was three Akçes. Promotion to a cavalry regiment implied a minimum salary of 10 Akçes. Janissaries received a sum of 12 Akçes every three months for clothing incidentals and 30 Akçes for weaponry, with an additional allowance for ammunition as well.

For all practical purposes, the Janissary Corps belonged to the Ottoman sultan and they were regarded as the protectors of the throne and the sultan. Janissaries were taught to consider the corps their home and family, and the sultan as their father. Only those who proved strong enough earned the rank of true Janissary at the age of 24 or 25. The Odjak inherited the property of dead Janissaries, thus acquiring wealth. Janissaries also learned to follow the dictates of the dervish and Sufi saint Haji Bektash Veli, disciples of whom had blessed the first troops. The Bektashi Order served as a kind of chaplaincy for the Janissaries. In this and in their secluded life, Janissaries resembled Christian military orders like the Knights Hospitaller. As a symbol of their devotion to the order, Janissaries wore special hats called börk. These hats also had a holding place in front, called the kaşıklık, for a spoon. This symbolized the kaşık kardeşliği, or the "brotherhood of the spoon", which reflected a sense of comradeship among the Janissaries who ate, slept, fought, and died together.

=== Training ===
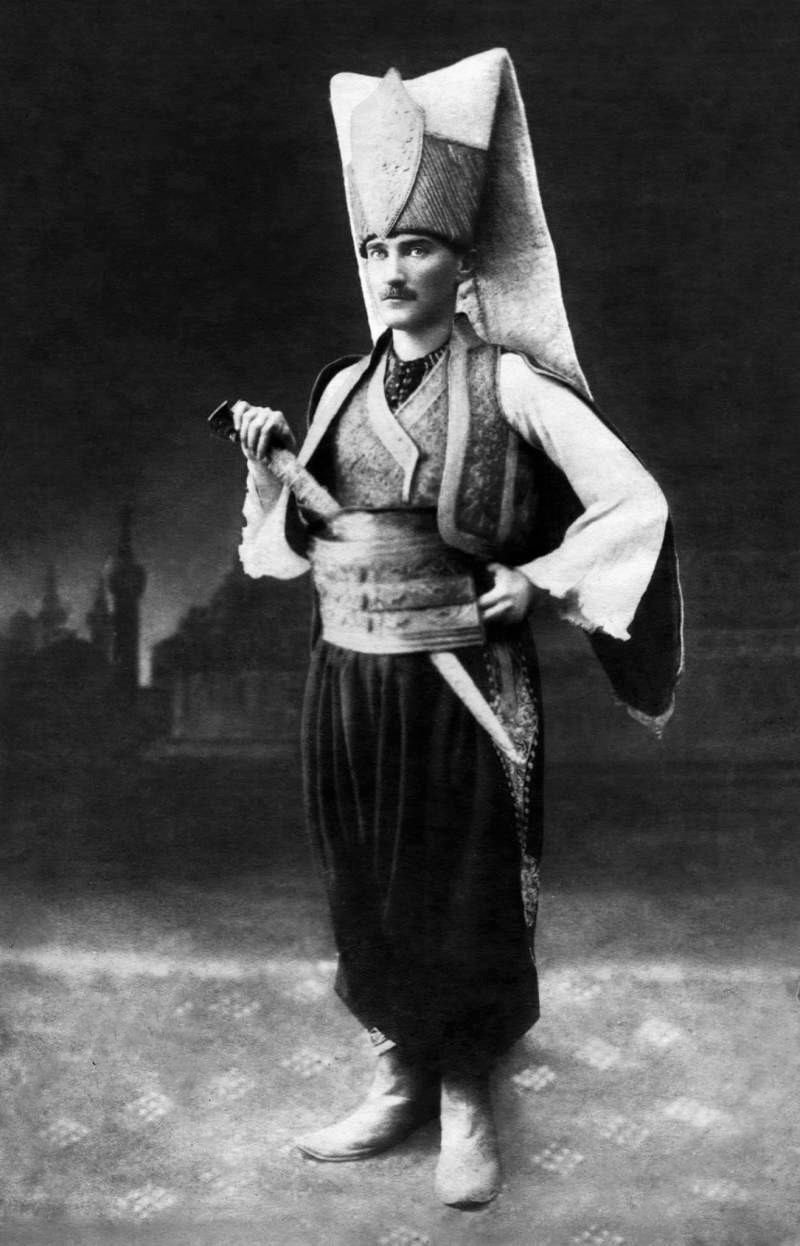
Mustafa Kemal Atatürk wearing the traditional Janissary uniform at a masquerade ball during his early years in the Ottoman army.

When a non-Muslim boy was recruited under the devşirme system of child levy enslavement, he would first be sent to selected Ottoman Turkish families in the provinces to learn Turkish, subjected to forced circumcision and forced conversion to Islam, and to learn the customs and culture of Ottoman society. After completing this period, acemi ("new recruit") boys were gathered for training at the Enderun acemi oğlan ("rookie" or "cadet") school in the capital city. There, young cadets would be selected for their talents in different areas to train as engineers, artisans, riflemen, clerics, archers, artillery, and so forth.

Janissaries were trained under strict discipline with hard labour and in practically monastic conditions in acemi oğlan ("rookie" or "cadet") schools, where they were expected to remain celibate. Unlike other Muslims, they were expressly forbidden to wear beards, only a moustache. These rules were obeyed by Janissaries at least until the 18th century, when they also began to engage in other crafts and trades, breaking another of the original rules. In the late 16th century, an Ottoman sultan gave in to the pressures of the Janissary Corps and permitted Janissary children to become members of the Corps, a practice strictly forbidden for 200 years. Consequently, succession rules, formerly strict, became open to interpretation. They gained their own power but kept the system from changing in other progressive ways.

Even after the rapid expansion of the corps at the end of the 16th century, the Janissaries continued to undergo strict training and discipline. They experimented with new battlefield tactics and, in 1605, became one of the first armies in Europe to implement rotating lines of volley fire in battle.

Giovanni Antonio Menavino, a Genoese who was enslaved in the Ottoman Empire from 1504 to around 1514, spent five years (until 1509 or 1510) as a page to the Sultan in the Seraglio of Constantinople. in chapter XXIII Delli novitii Giannizzeri Agiami Schiavi del gran Turco (On the novice Janissaries Agiami Slaves of the Great Turk) from his book Trattato de costumi et vita de Turchi (1548), he describes what he observed about the Agiami (novice Janissaries):

The novice Janissaries, numbering around five hundred, are kept and trained to become full members of the corps. Taken from their fathers and mothers in Greece, they do not speak Turkish. They receive a daily wage of two aspers. Their captain, called the Agiander agasi (Note: Typographical error for acemiler agası.), receives a stipend of thirty aspers and is issued a uniform. They are tasked with sweeping the entire Seraglio once a week, and when the Sultan orders construction, they carry lime, stones, water, and similar materials. In winter, they collect snow and store it underground in a place where it is preserved throughout the summer and used to cool the drinks of the Great Turk. When the Sultan goes to war, these novices remain in Constantinople.

== Reception of Janissaries in local populations subject to Devshirme ==
The devshirme system of conscription was deeply resented among many Christian populations of the Balkans. In Serbian, Greek, Bulgarian, and other regional historical memory, the forced levy of boys for service in the Ottoman administration and Janissary corps became one of the most enduring symbols of Ottoman rule. Folk traditions, epic poetry, and later nationalist historiography, frequently portrayed the practice as a form of child abduction and enslavement.

The historian George Finlay described the devshirme as "the tribute of children", and argued that the system inspired "universal hatred" among Christian populations of the empire. Likewise, the Romanian historian Nicolae Iorga referred to the practice as "one of the darkest features of Ottoman domination in the Balkans."

The Yugoslav writer Ivo Andrić, awarded the 1961 Nobel Prize in Literature for his historical novels concerning Ottoman Bosnia, depicted the devshirme in his novel The Bridge on the Drina. The novel opens with the removal of a Serbian Orthodox boy from Bosnia who would later become the Ottoman Grand Vizier Sokollu Mehmed Pasha (Serbian: Mehmed-paša Sokolović). According to the narrative, his later construction of the Višegrad bridge symbolically reflected a connection to the homeland from which he had been taken. Andrić described the collection of Christian boys for the "blood tribute" as follows:

'On that November day a long convoy of laden horses arrived on the left back of the river and halted there to spend the night. The aga of the janissaries, with armed escort, was returning to Stambul after collecting from the villages of eastern Bosnia the appointed number of Christian children for the blood tribute.

It was already the sixth year since the last collection of this tribute of blood, and so this time the choice had been easy and rich; the necessary number of healthy, bright and good-looking lads between ten and fifteen years old had been found without difficulty, even though many parents had hidden their children in the forests, taught them how to appear half-witted, clothed them in rags and let them get filthy, to avoid the aga's choice. Some went so far as to maim their own children, cutting off one of their fingers with an axe. The chosen children were laden on to little Bosnian horses in a long convoy. On each horse were two plaited panniers, like those for fruit, one on each side, and in every pannier was put a child, each with a small bundle and a round cake, the last thing they were to take from their parents' homes. From these panniers, which balanced and creaked in unison, peered out the fresh and frightened faces of the kidnapped children. Some of them gazed calmly across the horses' cruppers, looking as long as they could at their native land, others ate and wept at the same time, while others slept with heads resting on the pack-saddles.

A little way behind the last horses in that strange convoy straggled, dishevelled and exhausted, many parents and relatives of those children who were being carried away for ever to a foreign world, where they would be circumcized, become Turkish and, forgetting their faith, their country and their origin, would pass their lives in the ranks of the janissaries or in some other, higher, service of the Empire. They were for the most part women, mothers, grandmothers and sisters of the stolen children.

When they came too close, the aga's horsemen would drive them away with whips, urging their horses at them with loud cries to Allah. Then they would fly in all directions and hide in the forests along the roadsides, only to gather again a little later behind the convoy and strive with tear-filled eyes to see once again over the panniers the heads of the children who were being taken from them. The mothers were especially persistent and hard to restrain. Some would rush forward not looking where they were going, with bare breasts, and dishevelled hair, forgetting everything about them, wailing and lamenting as at a burial, while others almost out of their minds moaned as if their wombs were being torn by birth-pangs, and blinded with tears ran right on to the horsemen's whips and replied to every blow with the fruitless question: 'Where are you taking him? Why are you taking him from me?' Some tried to speak clearly to their children and to give them some last part of themselves, as much as might be said in a couple of words, some recommendation or advice for the way___

'Rade, my son, don't forget your mother....'

'Ilija, Ilija, Ilija!' screamed another woman, searching desperately with her glances for the dear well-known head and repeating this incessantly as if she wished to carve into the child's memory that name which would in a day or two be taken from him forever.

But the way was long, the earth hard, the body weak and the Osmanlis powerful and pitiless. Little by little the women dropped back exhausted by the march and the blows, and one after the other abandoned their vain effort. Here, at the Višegrad ferry, even the most enduring had to halt for they were not allowed on the ferry and were unable to cross the water. Now they could sit in peace on the bank and weep, for no one persecuted them any longer. There they waited as if turned to stone and sat, insensible to hunger, thirst and cold, until on the farther bank of the river they could see once more the long drawn out convoy of horses and riders as it moved onward towards Dubrina, and tried once more to catch a last glimpse of the children who were disappearing from their sight.'

— Ivo Andrić, The Bridge on the Drina, trans. Lovett F. Edwards, University of Chicago Press, 1977, pp. 28–33.

The novel's depiction became one of the most influential literary portrayals of the devshirme in South Slavic literature, and contributed significantly to modern popular perceptions of the Janissary system in the Balkans.

== Organization ==
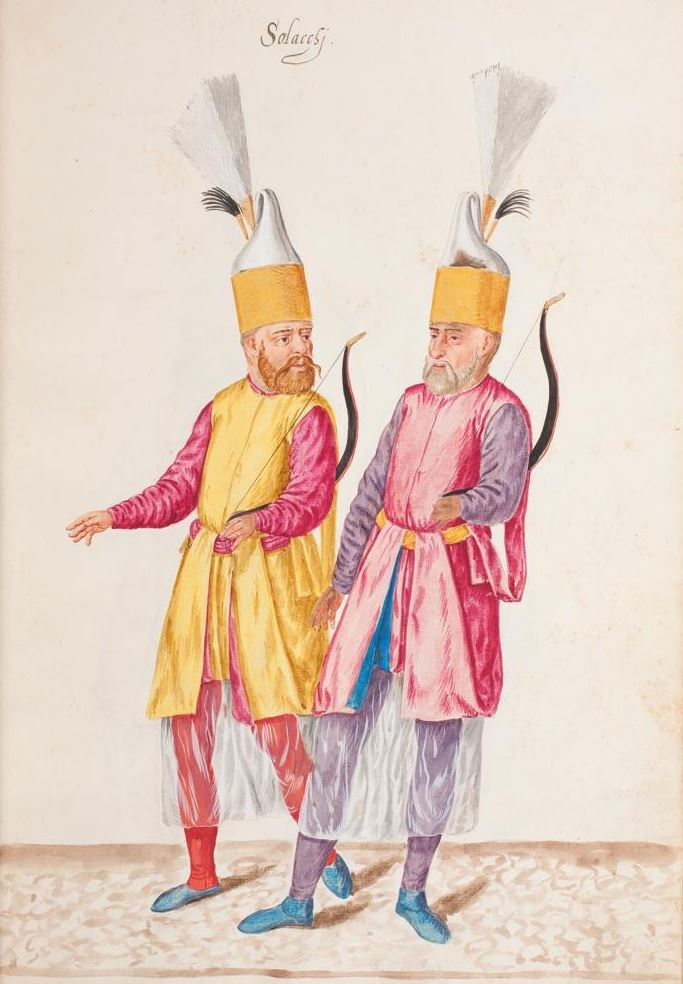
Solaks, the Janissary archer bodyguard of the Sultan by Lambert de Vos, c. 1574

The Janissary Corps was organized into orta ("centers"). An orta (equivalent to a battalion) was headed by a çorbaci. All orta together comprised the Janissary corps proper and its organization, named ocak ("hearth"). Suleiman I had 165 orta and the number increased over time to 196. While the Sultan was the supreme commander of the Ottoman Army and of the Janissaries in particular, the corps was organized and led by a commander, the ağa. The corps was divided into three sub-corps:

- the cemaat (frontier troops; also spelled jemaat in old sources), with 101 orta
- the bölük or beylik (the Sultan's own bodyguard), with 61 orta
- the sekban or seymen, with 34 orta

In addition there were also 34 orta of the ajemi ("cadets"). A semi-autonomous Janissary corps was permanently based in Algiers, called the Odjak of Algiers.

Originally Janissaries could be promoted only through seniority and within their own orta. They could leave the unit only to assume command of another. Only Janissaries' own commanding officers could punish them. The rank names were based on positions in the kitchen staff or Sultan's royal hunters; 64th and 65th Orta 'Greyhound Keepers' comprised as the only Janissary cavalry, perhaps to emphasise that Janissaries were servants of the Sultan. Local Janissaries, stationed in a town or city for a long time, were known as yerliyyas.

== Corps strength ==
Even though the Janissaries were part of the royal army and personal guards of the sultan, the corps was not the main force of the Ottoman military. In the classical period, Janissaries were only one-tenth of the overall Ottoman army, while the traditional Turkish cavalry made up the rest of the main battle force. According to David Nicolle, the number of Janissaries in the 14th century was 1,000 and about 6,000 in 1475. The same source estimates the number of Timarli Sipahi, the provincial cavalry which constituted the main force of the army at 40,000.

Beginning in the 1530s, the size of the Janissary corps began to dramatically expand, a result of the rapid conquests the Ottomans were carrying out during those years. Janissaries were used extensively to garrison fortresses and for siege warfare, which was becoming increasingly important for the Ottoman military. The pace of expansion increased after the 1570s, due to the initiation of a series of wars with the Safavid Empire and, after 1593, with the Habsburg monarchy. By 1609, the size of the corps had stabilized at approximately 40,000 men, but increased again later in the century, during the period of the Cretan War (1645–1669) and particularly the War of the Holy League (1683–1699).

Paper strength of the Janissary corps
Year	1400	1484	1523	1530	1547	1574	1582	1592	1609	1654	1666–67	1687–88	1699	1710–71
Strength	<1,000	7,841	7,164	8,407	12,131	13,599	16,905	23,232	37,627	51,047	47,233	62,826	67,729	43,562

== Equipment ==
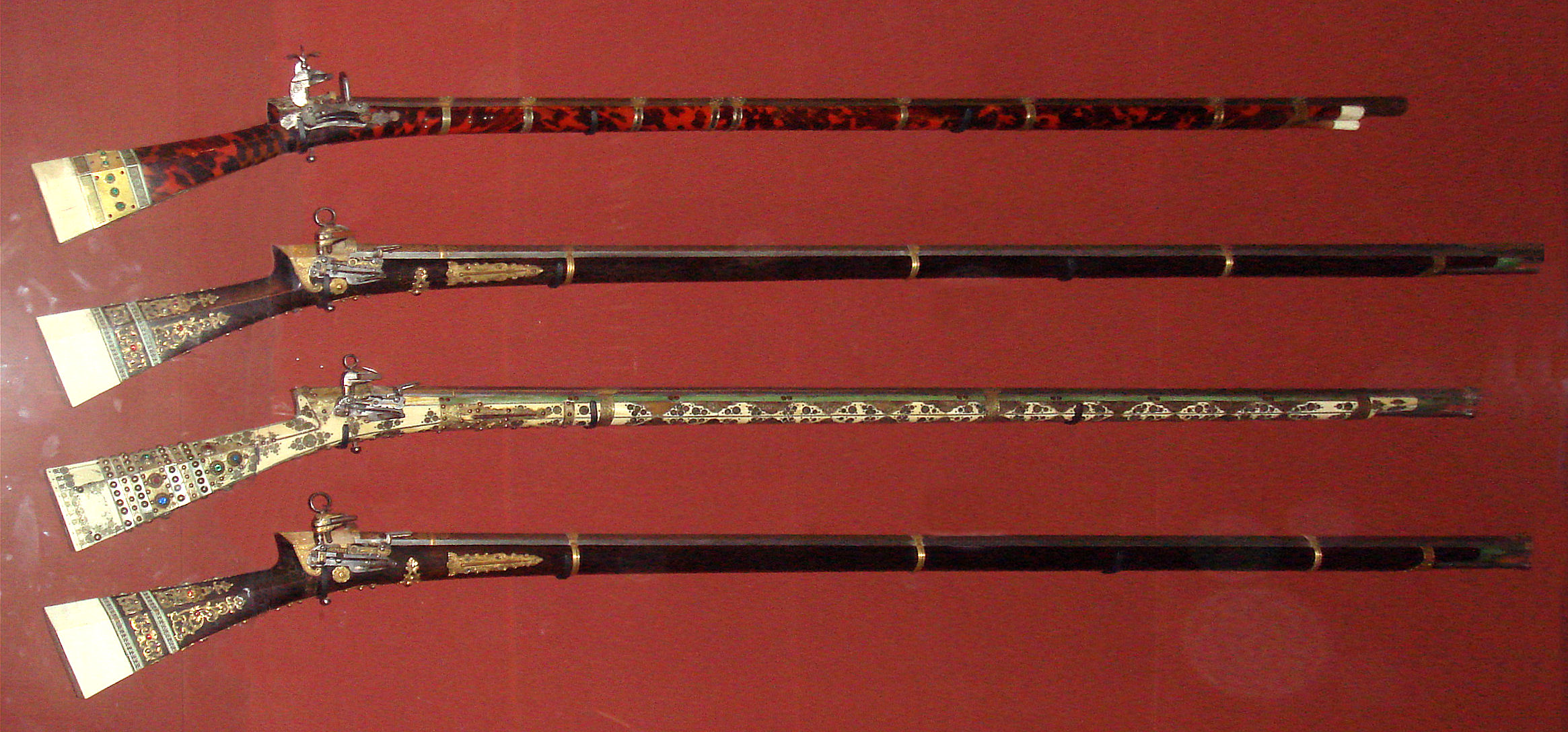
Shishane with miquelet locks, 1750–1800, Army Museum, Paris

During the initial period of formation, Janissaries were expert archers, but they began adopting firearms during the early to mid 1400s. The siege of Vienna in 1529 confirmed the reputation of their engineers, e.g. sappers, and miners. In melee combat, they used axes and kilijs. Originally in peacetime, they could carry only clubs or daggers, unless they served as border troops. Turkish yatagan swords were the signature weapon of the Janissaries, almost a symbol of the corps.

By the early 16th century, the Janissaries were equipped with and were skilled with muskets. In particular, they used a massive "trench gun", firing an 80-millimetre (3.1 in) ball, which was "feared by their enemies". Janissaries also made extensive use of early grenades and hand cannons, such as the abus gun. Pistols were not initially popular, but they became so after the Cretan War (1645–1669).

== Battles ==
The Ottoman Empire used Janissaries in all its major campaigns, including the 1453 capture of Constantinople, the defeat of the Mamluk Sultanate of Cairo and wars against Hungary and Austria. Janissary troops were always led to the battle by the Sultan himself, and always had a share of the loot. The Janissary corps was the only infantry division of the Ottoman army. In battle the Janissaries' main mission was to protect the Sultan, using cannons and smaller firearms, and holding the centre of the army against enemy attack during the strategic fake forfeit of Turkish cavalry. The Janissary corps also included smaller expert teams: explosive experts, engineers and technicians, sharpshooters (with arrow and rifle) and sappers who dug tunnels under fortresses, etc.

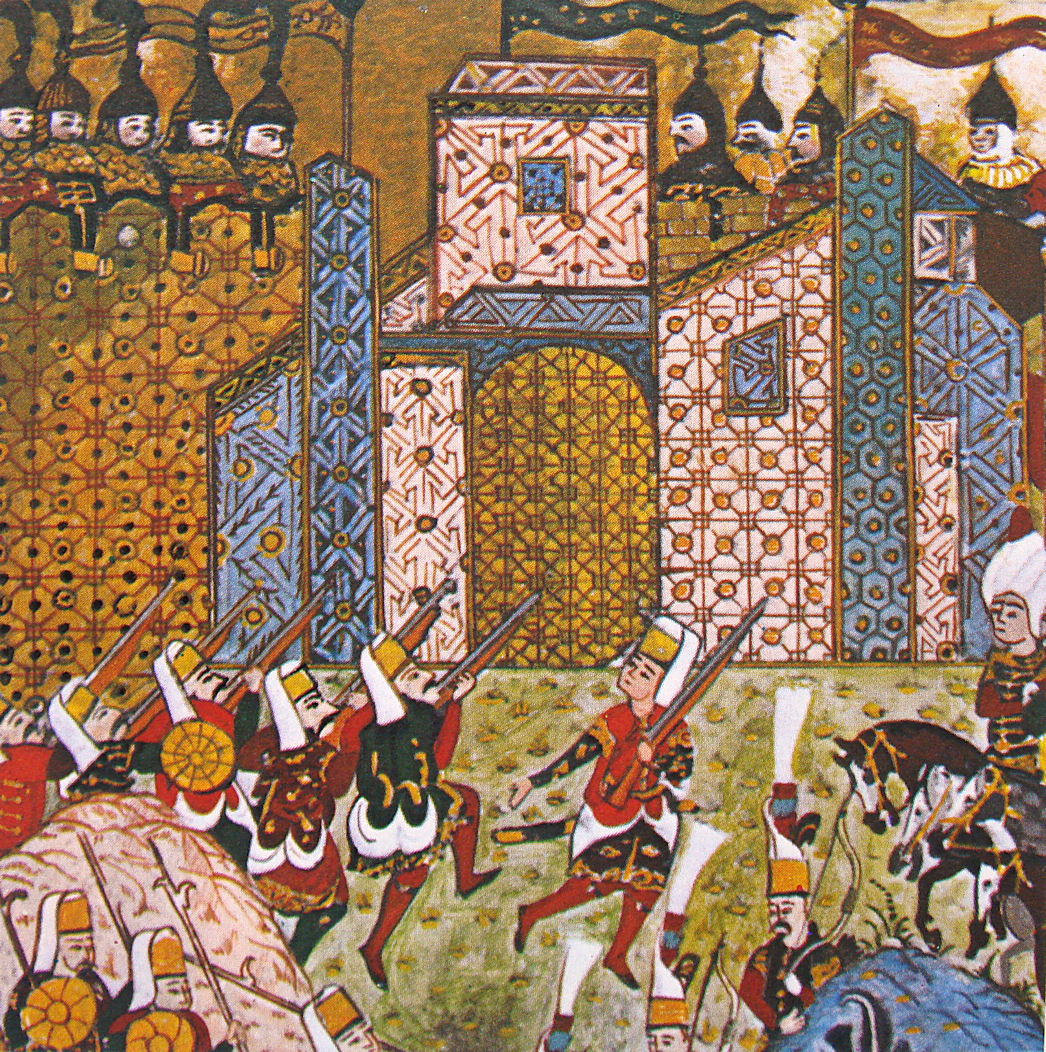
Janissaries battling the Knights Hospitaller, who are depicted wearing Eastern Armour. during the Siege of Rhodes in 1522.

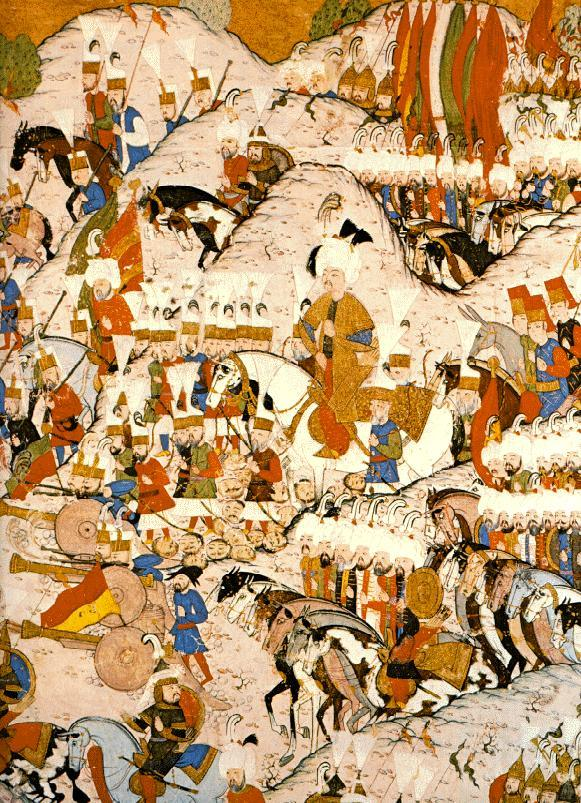
Battle of Mohács, 1526.

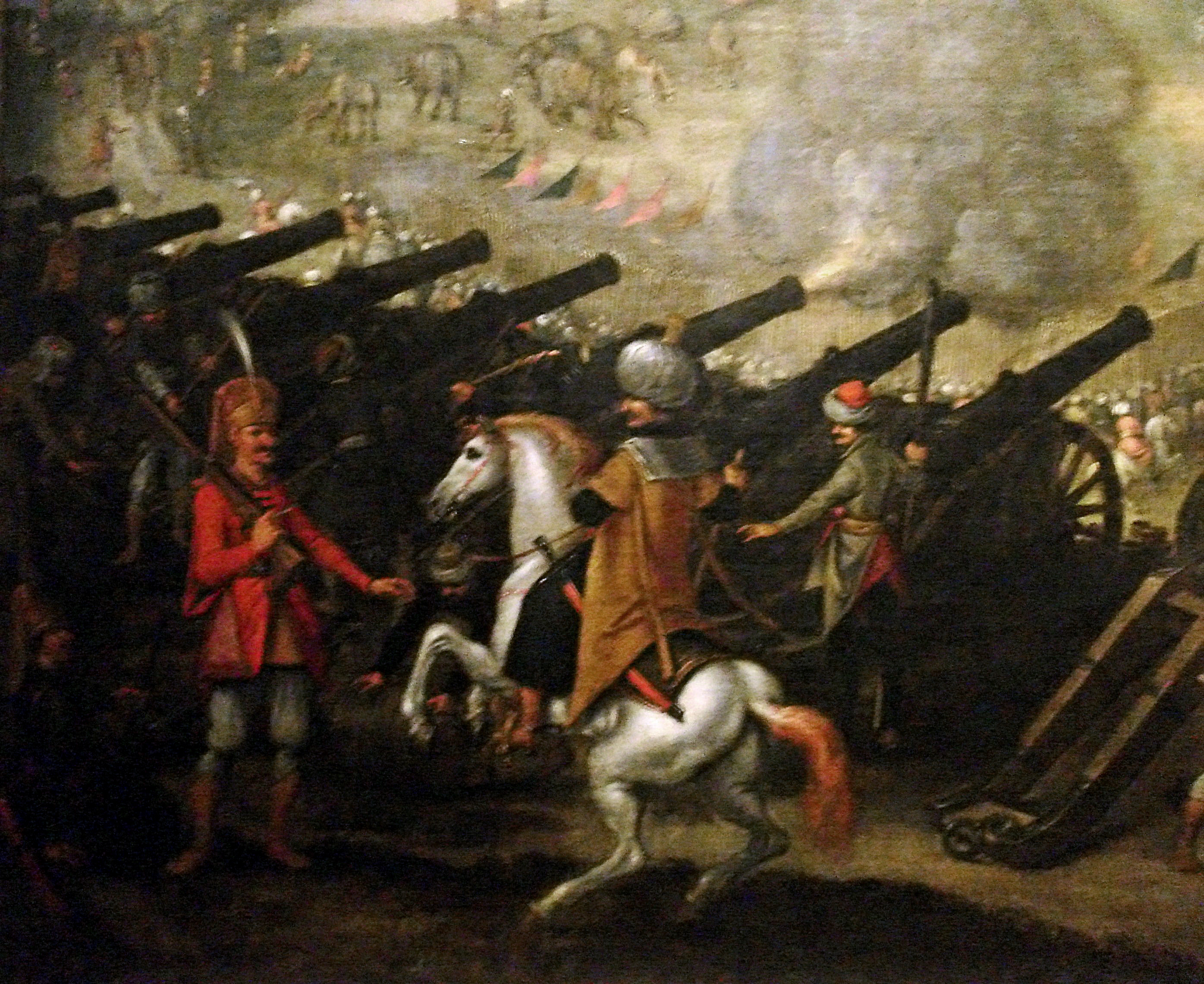
A Janissary, a pasha and cannon batteries at the Siege of Esztergom in 1543.

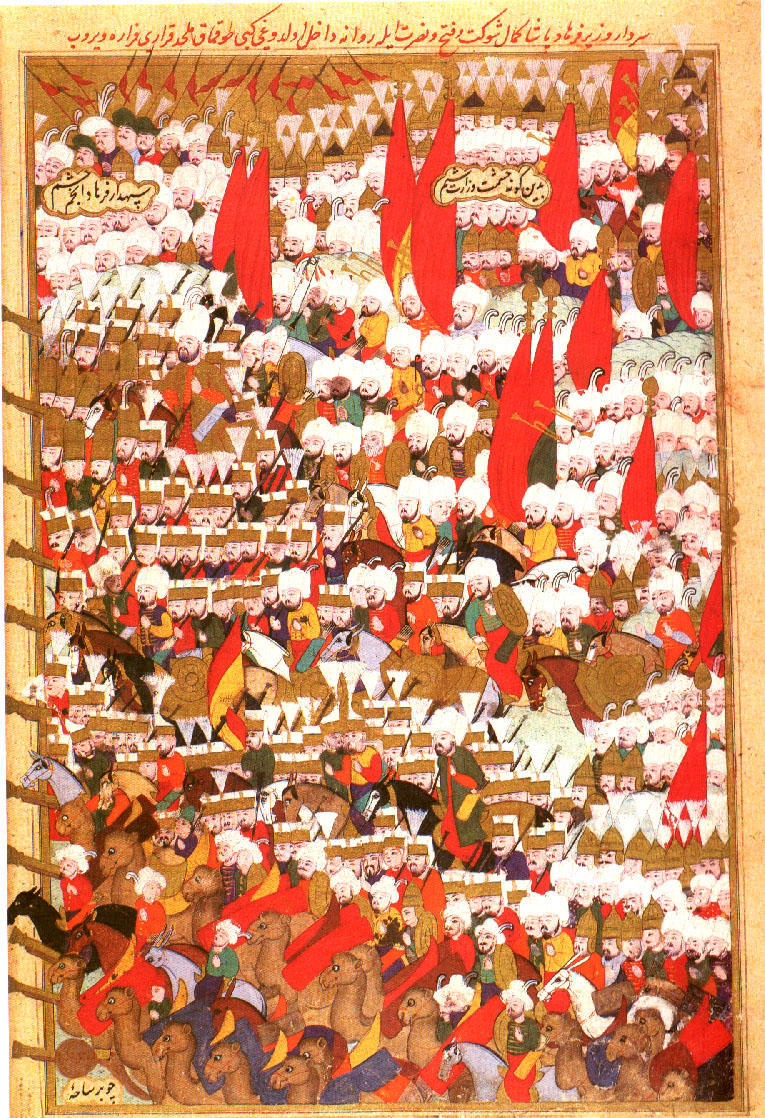
Sultan Murad III's expedition to Revan.

== Revolts and disbandment ==
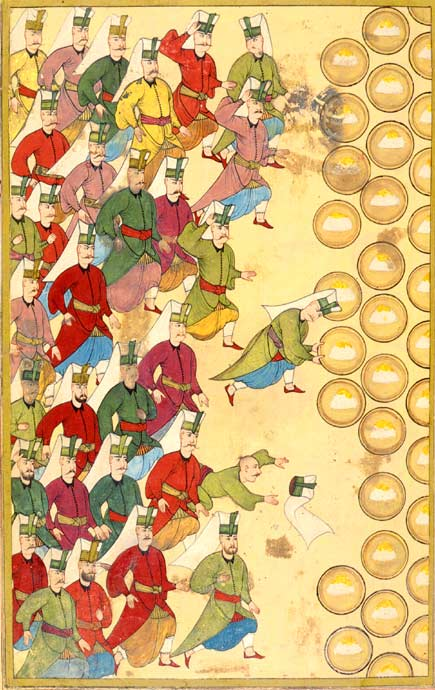
Banquet (Safranpilav) for the Janissaries, given by the Sultan. If they refused the meal, they signaled their disapproval of the Sultan. In this case they accept the meal. Ottoman miniature painting, from the Surname-i Vehbi (1720) at the Topkapı Palace Museum in Istanbul.

As Janissaries became aware of their own importance, they began to desire a better life. By the early 17th century, Janissaries had such prestige and influence that they dominated the government. They could mutiny, dictate policy, and hinder efforts to modernize the army structure. Additionally, the Janissaries found they could change Sultans as they wished through palace coups. New rules allowed them to own land and establish businesses. They would also limit the enlistment of new Janissaries to their own sons who did not have to go through the original training period in the acemi oğlan, as well as avoiding the physical selection, thereby reducing their military value. When Janissaries could practically extort money from the Sultan and business and family life replaced martial fervour, their effectiveness as combat troops decreased.

In 1449, they revolted for the first time, demanding higher wages, which they obtained. The stage was set for a decadent evolution, like that of the Streltsy of Tsar Peter's Russia or that of the Praetorian Guard which proved the greatest threat to Roman emperors, rather than effective protection. After 1451, every new Sultan felt obligated to pay each Janissary a reward and raise his pay rank (although since early Ottoman times, every other member of the Topkapi court received a pay raise as well). Sultan Selim II gave Janissaries permission to marry in 1566, undermining the exclusivity of loyalty to the dynasty. By 1622, the Janissaries were a "serious threat" to the stability of the Empire. Through their "greed and indiscipline", they were now a law unto themselves and, against modern European armies, ineffective on the battlefield as a fighting force. In 1622, the teenage Sultan Osman II, after a defeat during war against Poland, determined to curb Janissaries' excesses. Outraged at becoming "subject to his own slaves", he tried to disband the Janissary corps, blaming it for the disaster during the Polish war. In the spring, hearing rumours that the Sultan was preparing to move against them, the Janissaries revolted and took the Sultan captive, imprisoning him in the notorious Seven Towers: he was murdered shortly afterward.

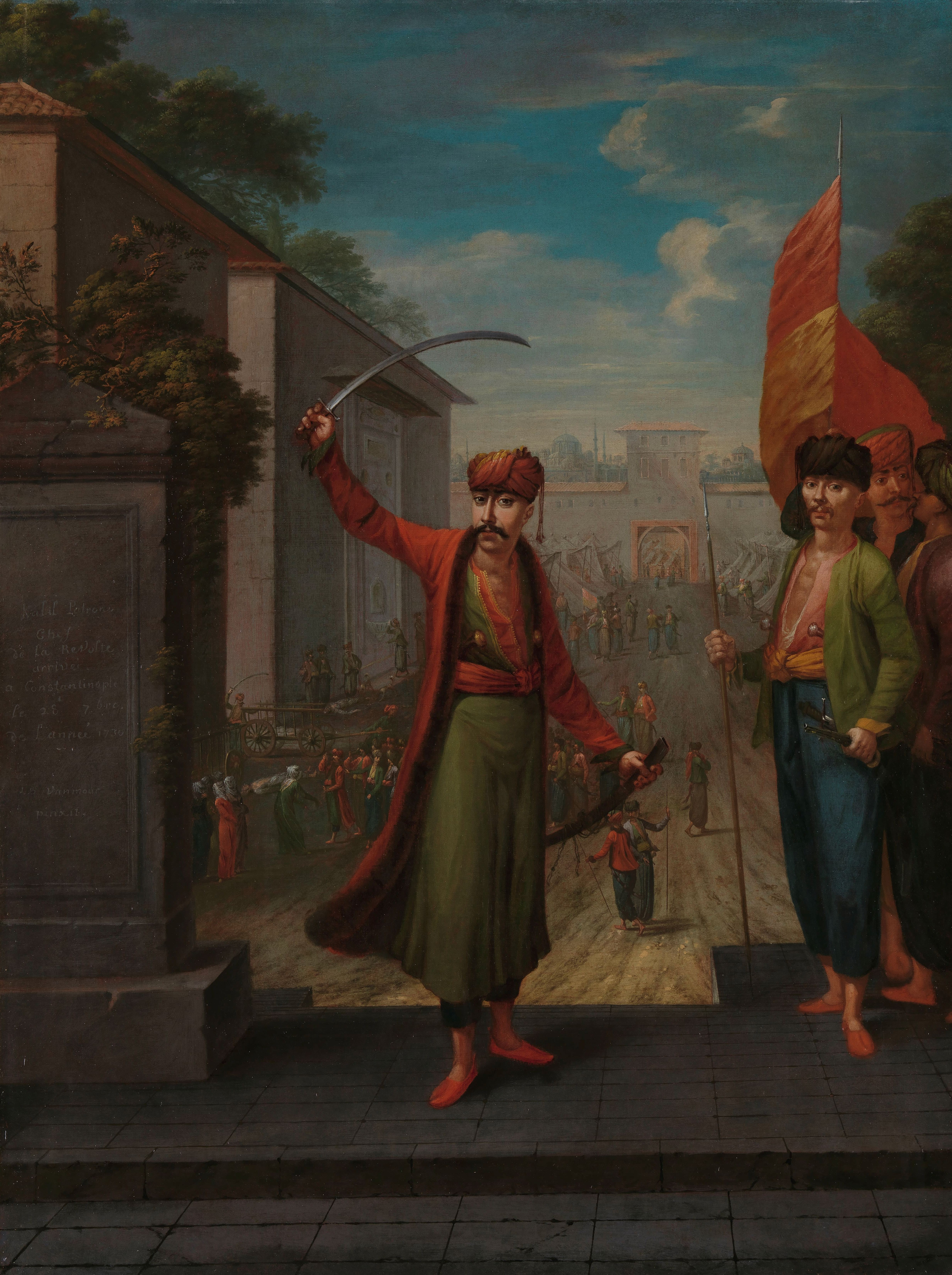
Patrona Halil with some of his supporters, painting by Jean Baptiste Vanmour, c. 1730–1737.

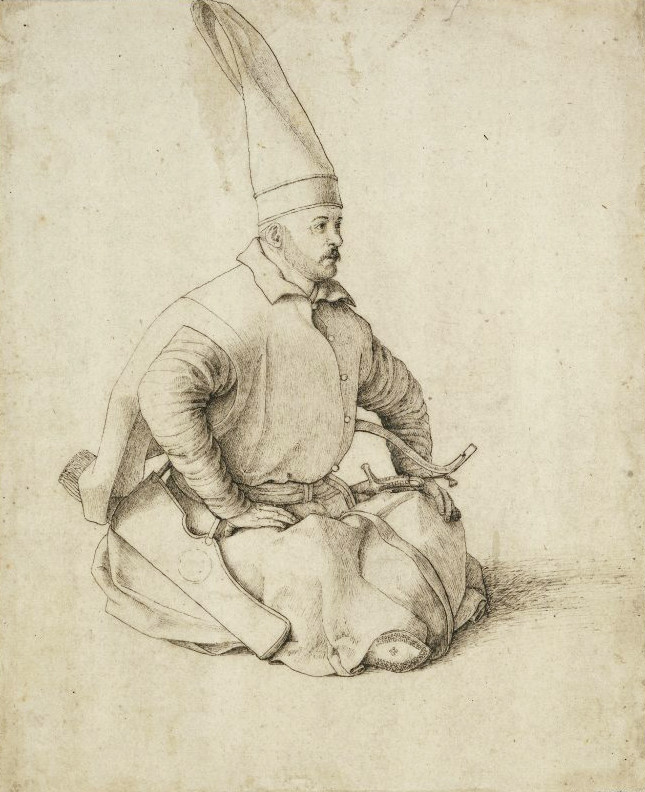
A 15th-century Janissary, drawing by Gentile Bellini, who also painted the renowned portrait of Sultan Mehmed II

The extravagant parties of the Ottoman ruling classes during the Tulip Period caused a lot of unrest among the Ottoman population. In September 1730, janissaries headed by Patrona Halil backed in Istanbul a rebellion by 12,000 Albanian troops which caused the abdication of Sultan Ahmed III and the death of the Grand Vizier Damad Ibrahim. The rebellion was crushed in three weeks with the massacre of 7,000 rebels, but it marked the end of the Tulip Era and the beginning of Sultan Mahmud I's reign. In 1804, the Dahias, the Janissary junta that ruled Serbia at the time, having taken power in the Sanjak of Smederevo in defiance of the Sultan, feared that the Sultan would make use of the Serbs to oust them. To forestall this they decided to execute all prominent nobles throughout Central Serbia, a move known as the Slaughter of the Knezes. According to historical sources of the city of Valjevo, the heads of the murdered men were put on public display in the central square to serve as an example to those who might plot against the rule of the Janissaries. The event triggered the start of the Serbian Revolution with the First Serbian Uprising aimed at putting an end to the 370 years of Ottoman occupation of modern Serbia.

In 1807, a Janissary revolt deposed Sultan Selim III, who had tried to modernize the army along Western European lines. This modern army that Selim III created was called Nizam-ı Cedid. His supporters failed to recapture power before Mustafa IV had him killed, but elevated Mahmud II to the throne in 1808. When the Janissaries threatened to oust Mahmud II, he had the captured Mustafa executed and eventually came to a compromise with the Janissaries. Ever mindful of the threat that the Janissaries posed, the sultan spent the next years discreetly securing his position. The Janissaries' abuse of power, military ineffectiveness, resistance to reform, and the cost of salaries to 135,000 men, many of whom were not actually serving soldiers, had all become intolerable.

By 1826, the sultan was ready to move against the Janissaries in favour of a more modern military. The sultan informed them, through a fatwa, that he was forming a new army, organised and trained along modern European lines. As predicted, they mutinied, advancing on the sultan's palace. In the ensuing fight, the Janissaries' barracks were set aflame by artillery fire, resulting in 4,000 Janissary fatalities. The survivors were either exiled or executed, and their possessions were confiscated by the Sultan. This event is now called the Auspicious Incident. The last of the Janissaries were then put to death by decapitation in what was later called the Tower of Blood, in Thessaloniki.

After the Janissaries were disbanded by Mahmud II, he then created a new army soon after recruiting 12,000 troops. This new army was formally named the Trained Victorious Soldiers of Muhammad, the Mansure Army for short. By 1830, the army expanded to 27,000 troops and included the Sipahi cavalry. By 1838, all Ottoman fighting corps were included and the army changed its name to the Ordered troops. This military corps lasted until the end of the empire's history.

== Music ==
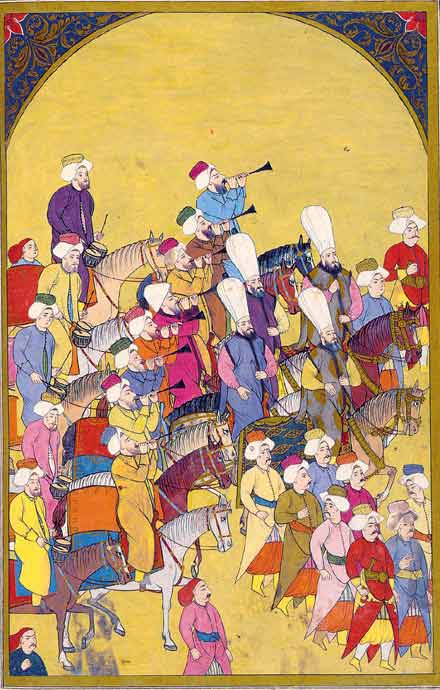
Janissaries marching to Mehter martial tunes played by the Mehterân military band. Ottoman miniature painting, from the Surname-i Vehbi (1720) at the Topkapı Palace Museum in Istanbul.

The military music of the Janissaries was noted for its powerful percussion and shrill winds combining kös (giant timpani), davul (bass drum), zurna (a loud shawm), naffir, or boru (natural trumpet), çevgan bells, triangle (a borrowing from Europe), and cymbals (zil), among others. Janissary music influenced European classical musicians such as Wolfgang Amadeus Mozart and Ludwig van Beethoven, both of whom composed music in the Turkish style. Examples include Mozart's Piano Sonata No. 11 (c. 1783), Beethoven's incidental music for The Ruins of Athens (1811), and the final movement of Beethoven's Symphony No. 9, although the Beethoven example is now considered a march rather than Alla turca.

Sultan Mahmud II abolished the mehter band in 1826 along with the Janissary corps. Mahmud replaced the mehter band in 1828 with a European style military band trained by Giuseppe Donizetti. In modern times, although the Janissary corps no longer exists as a professional fighting force, the tradition of Mehter music is carried on as a cultural and tourist attraction.

In 1952, the Janissary military band, Mehterân, was organized again under the auspices of the Istanbul Military Museum. They hold performances during some national holidays as well as in some parades during days of historical importance. For more details, see Turkish music (style) and Mehter.

== Modern traditions ==
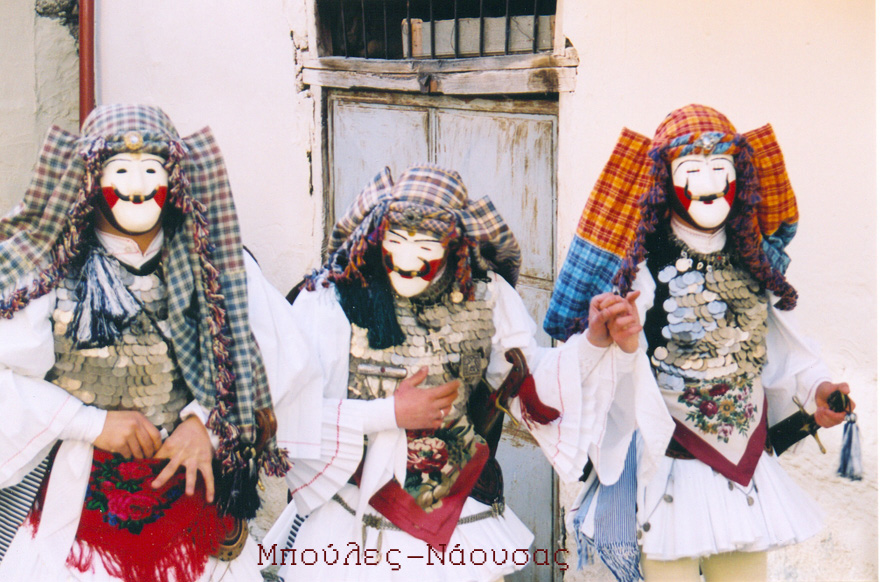
Greek traditional costumes

"Janissaries and boules" is a carnival tradition of Naousa, Greece, dating back to the 18th century. It is said that in 1705, Turks attempted the first child kidnapping in Naousa, only to be met with the people of Naousa resisting and killing the sultan's envoy. This resulted in many Greeks becoming klephts and fleeing in the mountains, most of whom were eventually killed by Turks. The next year, instead of holding a memorial service for those who died, the people of Naousa wore the clothing of the armatoles and a face mask (known as prosopo) so that the Turks couldn't recognize them. In this attire, they returned to their city and reenacted the events of 1705. Today, this attire remains a popular carnival tradition in Naousa. It includes people dancing in crowds in the streets of Naousa, with musical instruments such as zournades and daoulia.

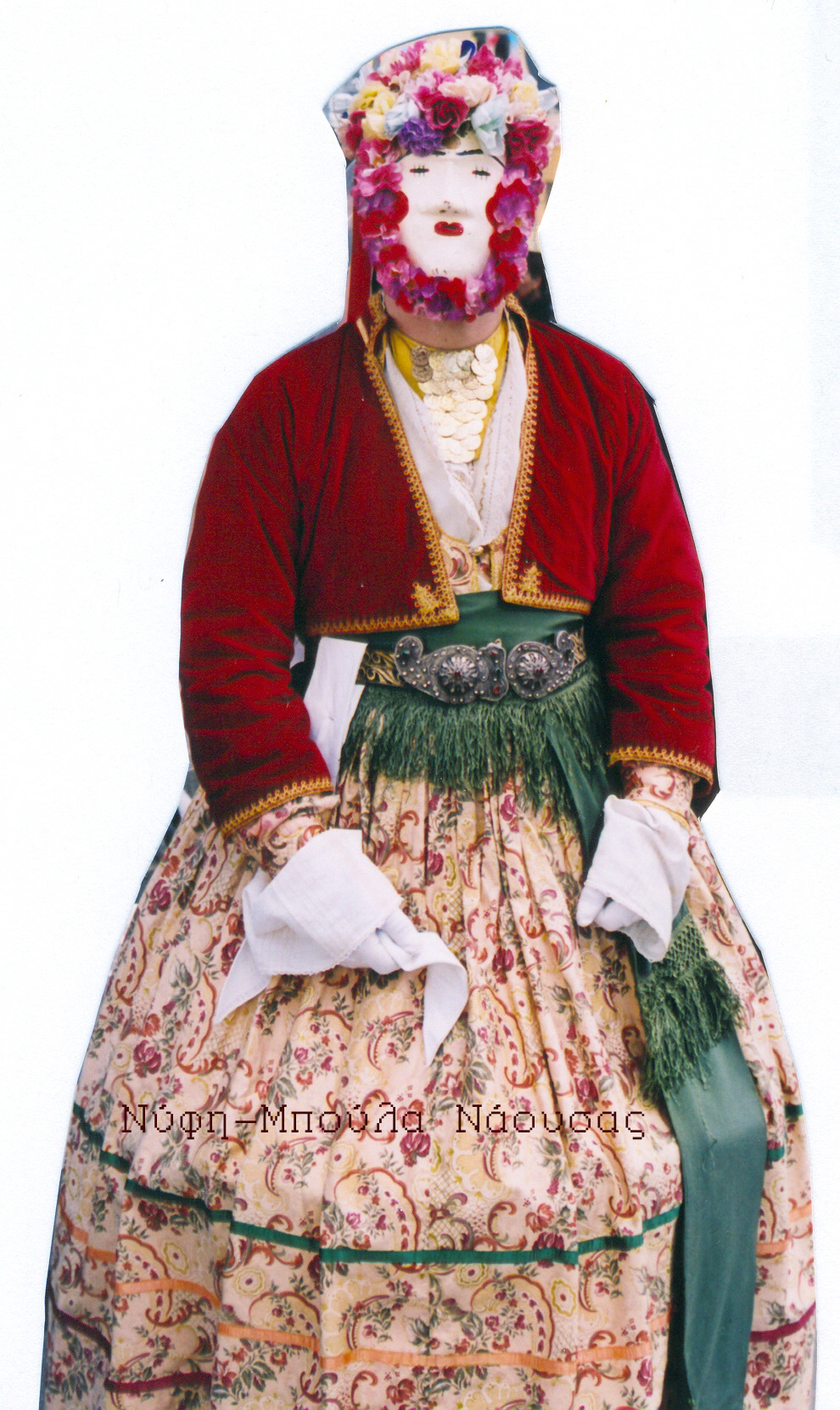
Greek traditional boula costume

Traditionally, only young men participate in the event, meaning that the female figures (boules) are also worn by men.

== Popular culture ==
- In Bulgaria and elsewhere, and for centuries in Ukraine, the word Janissar (яничар) is used as a synonym of the word renegade.
- The Janissary Tree, a novel by Jason Goodwin set in 19th-century Istanbul
- The Sultan's Helmsman, a historical novel of the Ottoman Navy and Renaissance Italy
- Salman Rushdie's novel The Enchantress of Florence details the life, organization, and origins of the Janissaries. One of the lead characters of the novel, Antonio Argalia, is the head of the Ottoman Janissaries.
- Janissaries, a 1979 novel by Jerry Pournelle
- Muhteşem Yüzyıl (The Magnificent Century) is a 2011–2014 Turkish historical fiction television series. Written by Meral Okay and Yılmaz Şahin. The Janissaries are portrayed throughout the series as part of the Sultan's royal bodyguard. The First Oath of their military order is recited in Season 1 at the Ceremony of Payment. The janissaries play a more major role in the sequel tv show Muhteşem Yüzyıl: Kösem (lit. 'Magnificent Century: Kösem'), notably through the adaptation of the Polish Campaign led by Osman II and the rise of Mustafa I.
- The popular song in Serbian, Janissar (Јањичар) by Predrag Gojković Cune
- Janissaries are the unique unit of the Ottoman Empire in Civilization IV, V, expansions of VI, Cossacks, Age of Empires II, Age of Empires III, Age of Empires IV, Europa Universalis V, and Rise of Nations.
- The Janissaries during the rule of Sultan Bayezid II are featured heavily in Assassin's Creed: Revelations.
- Janissaries appear in several books in the Lymond Chronicles by Dorothy Dunnett.
- In the song "Winged Hussars" by Sabaton about the Battle of Vienna 1683 the question is asked if "Janissaries are you ready to die?" to illustrate the impact of the arrival of the Winged Hussars in the battle.
- In the 2020 Turkish historical docudrama Rise of Empires: Ottoman, Janissaries appear throughout the show in both seasons as part of Mehmed II's army.

== See also ==
- Mamluk
- Military of the Ottoman Empire
- Saqaliba
- Genízaro
- Ottoman decline thesis
- Agha, a civilian and military title in the Ottoman Empire
- Malassay, elite infantry of the Adal Sultanate
- Akinji, irregular military scouts of Ottoman Empire
- Azeb, irregular soldiers of unmarried youths, serving in various roles in the early Ottoman army

== Bibliography ==
- Ágoston, Gábor (2014). "Firearms and Military Adaptation: The Ottomans and the European Military Revolution, 1450–1800". Journal of World History. 25: 85–124. doi:10.1353/jwh.2014.0005. S2CID 143042353.
- Aksan, Virginia H. "Whatever Happened to the Janissaries? Mobilization for the 1768–1774 Russo-Ottoman War." War in History (1998) 5#1 pp: 23–36. online Archived 2016-07-29 at the Wayback Machine
- Kinross, Lord (1977). The Ottoman Centuries: The Rise and Fall of the Turkish Empire. London: Perennial. ISBN 978-0-688-08093-8.
- Benesch, Oleg. "Comparing Warrior Traditions: How the Janissaries and Samurai Maintained Their Status and Privileges During Centuries of Peace." Comparative Civilizations Review 55.55 (2006): 6:37-55 Online Archived 2019-11-09 at the Wayback Machine.
- Chisholm, Hugh, ed. (1911). "Janissaries" . Encyclopædia Britannica. Vol. 15 (11th ed.). Cambridge University Press. pp. 151–152.
- Cleveland, William L. A History of the Modern Middle East (Boulder: Westview, 2004)
- Goodwin, Godfrey (2001). The Janissaries. UK: Saqi Books. ISBN 978-0-86356-055-2; anecdotal and not scholarly says Aksan (1998)
- Goodwin, Jason (1998). Lords of the Horizons: A History of the Ottoman Empire. New York: H. Holt. ISBN 0-8050-4081-1.
- Huart, Cl. (1987). "Janissaries". In Houtsma, Martijn Theodoor (ed.). E.J. Brill's first encyclopaedia of Islam, 1913–1936, Volume IV: 'Itk–Kwaṭṭa. Leiden: BRILL. pp. 572–574. ISBN 90-04-08265-4.
- Kafadar, Cemal (1995). Between Two Worlds: The Construction of the Ottoman State. Berkeley: University of California Press. ISBN 978-0-520-20600-7.
- Kitsikis, Dimitri, (1985, 1991, 1994). L'Empire ottoman. Paris,: Presses Universitaires de France. ISBN 2-13-043459-2
- Murphey, Rhads (2002). "Yeñi Čeri". In Bearman, P. J.; Bianquis, Th.; Bosworth, C. E.; van Donzel, E. & Heinrichs, W. P. (eds.). The Encyclopaedia of Islam, Second Edition. Volume XI: W–Z. Leiden: E. J. Brill. pp. 322–331. ISBN 978-90-04-12756-2.
- Nicolle, David (1983). Armies of the Ottoman Turks 1300-1774. Osprey Publishing.
- Nicolle, David (1995). The Janissaries. London: Osprey Publishing. ISBN 978-1-85532-413-8.
- Shaw, Stanford J. (1976). History of the Ottoman Empire and Modern Turkey (Vol. I). New York: Cambridge University Press. ISBN 978-0-521-29163-7
- Shaw, Stanford J. & Shaw, Ezel Kural (1977). History of the Ottoman Empire and Modern Turkey (Vol. II). New York: Cambridge University Press. ISBN 978-0-521-29166-8
- Uzunçarşılı, İsmail (1988). Osmanlı Devleti Teşkilatından Kapıkulu Ocakları: Acemi Ocağı ve Yeniçeri Ocağı. Ankara: Türk Tarih Kurumu. ISBN 975-16-0056-1.
