= Lambert Wyts =

Flemish courtier, draughtsman and diarist

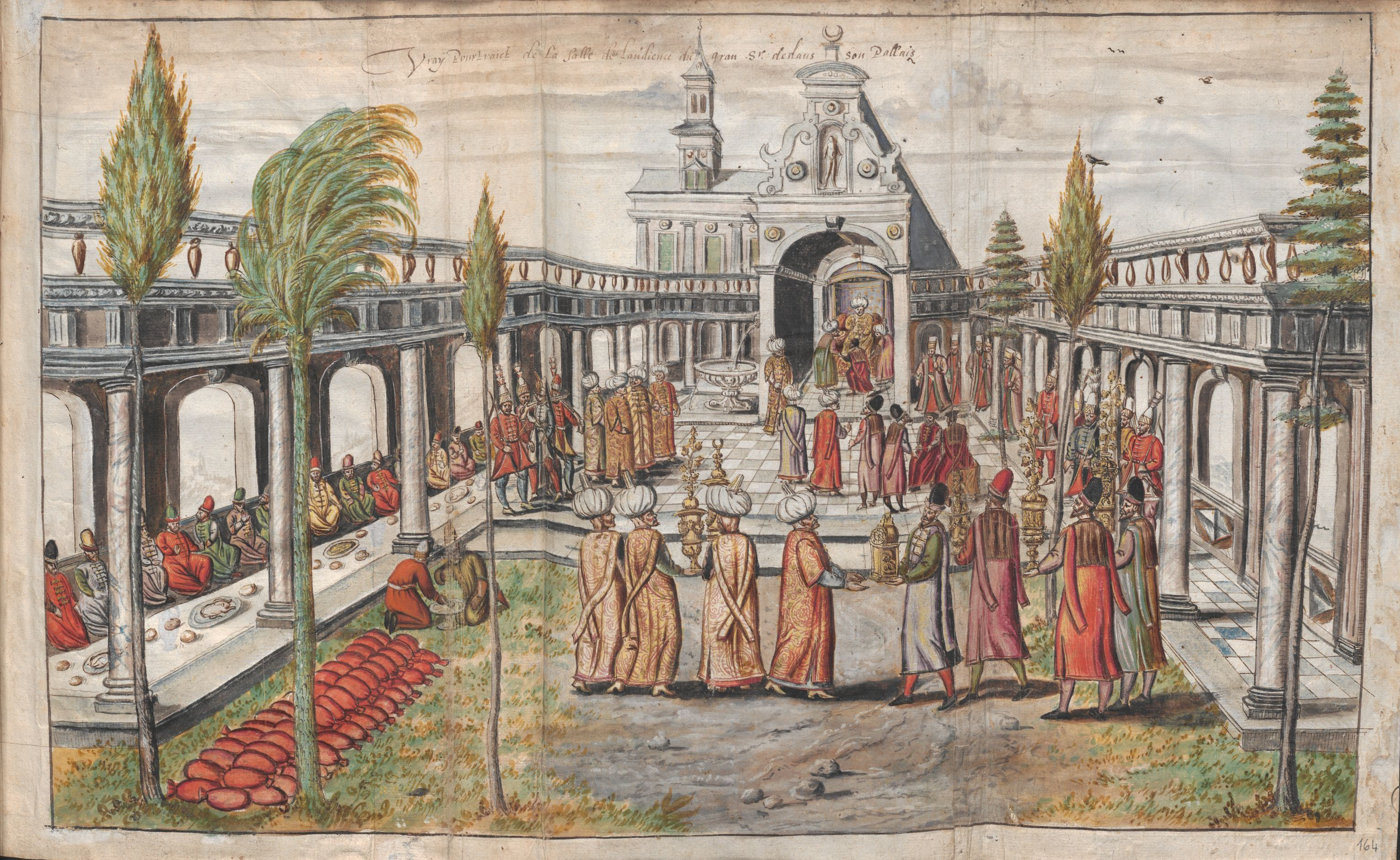
Presentation of the Tribute to the Sultan at the Topkapı Palace

Lambert Wyts or Lambert Wijts (1542 – ?) was a Flemish courtier, draughtsman and diarist. Born into a prominent family in the County of Flanders he became a courtier in the service of the Habsburg dynasty. In this role, he made three diplomatic trips respectively to Spain, Turkey and the Holy Roman Empire. He kept a diary of his travels which contribute to the understanding of contemporary circumstances in those countries. In particular, his diary regarding his trip to Turkey, with its drawings of events and local people and their dress, is of importance in this regard. In the past he has been mixed up with a contemporary Fleming from Mechelen by the name Lambert de Vos, a trained artist who traveled at the same time to Turkey where he made various drawings of local costumes and sights.

== Life ==
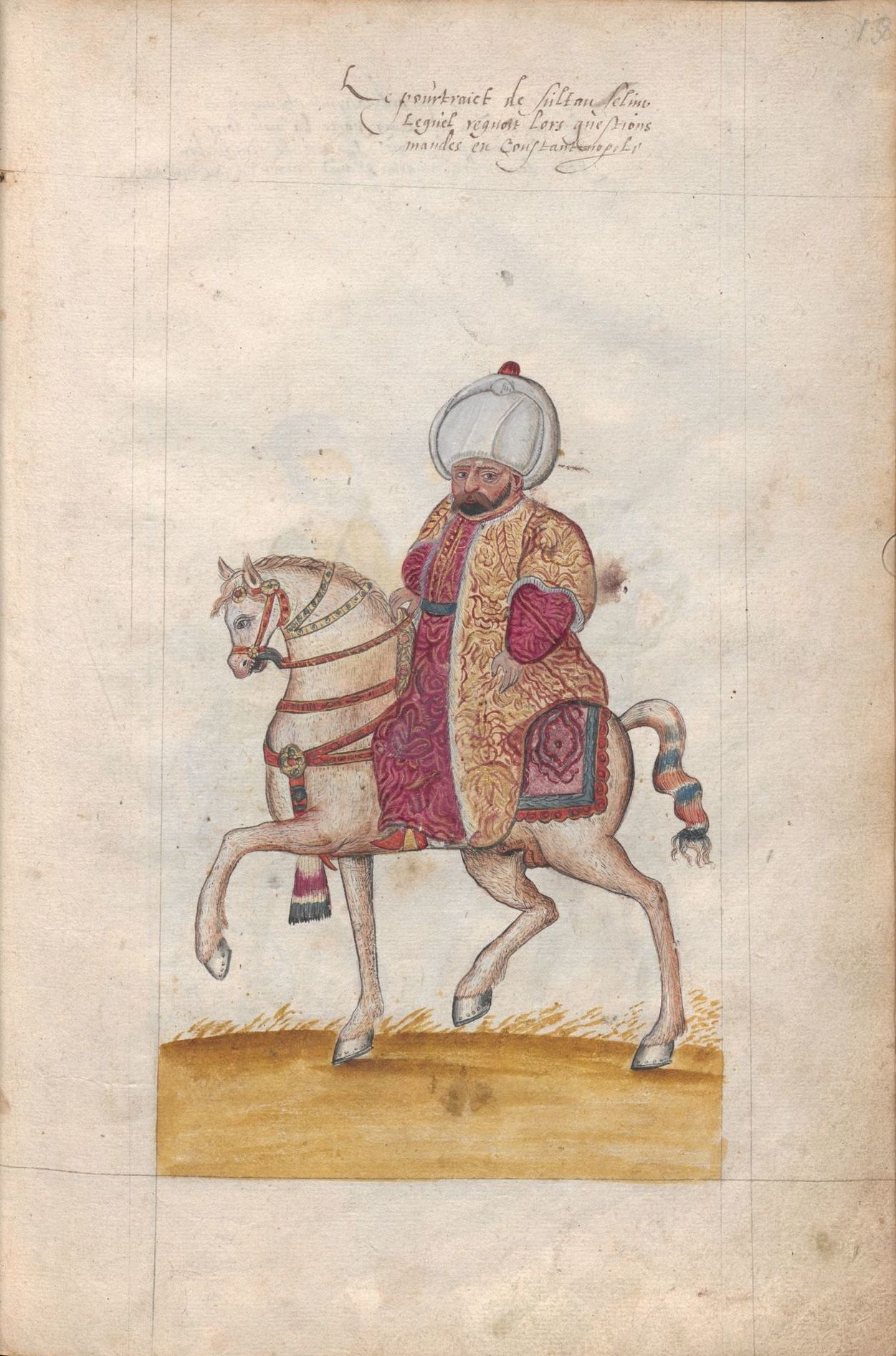
Portrait of Sultan Selim II

Lambert Wyts was born in 1542 as the son of Josse Wyts and Catherine Villain dit de la Boucharderie. His father was a member of a local aristocratic family in Flanders and held the title of lord of Wildenburg, Berentrode and Wytsvliet. The grandfather of Lambert had served the Emperor Maximilian I and his son Philip I of Castile. Lambert's mother was born in the local aristocracy, and had the title 'lady of de la Boucharderie', which refers to the stone-cutting trade. His father was appointed in 1524 as ‘watergraaf’ and ‘moermeester’ of Flanders, which put him in charge of the local water management. The family also operated a commercial fish pond. His father died in 1544.

Lambert was one of fifteen children. His brother Paul (died in 1600) became lord of Wytsvliet after the death of their father while his brother Jan (born in 1528) became lord of Wildenburg after the death of their father. Their sister Cecile (died in 1602) took the title 'de la Boucharderie' and married François de Croix in 1554. Very little is known about Lambert's youth and training. Most details about him are derived from his diary on his travels as a courtier to Spain, Turkey and Germany. In his diary he states that he had previously traveled to Italy where he resided for four or five years. He had also joined the appeal to join in 1565 the Maltese in their resistance to the Ottomans. He had further fought in Sicily, Naples and Hungary.

After his trips to Spain, Turkey and Germany he returned to Flanders in 1575. Lambert married Lievine Geerolfs. He was recorded living in Brussels in 1578. It is not known when or where he died.

== The Itinera in Hispaniam, Viennam et Constantinopolim ==
=== General ===
Lambert Wyts is now known mainly because of the diary he kept during his travels as a courtier to Spain, Turkey and Germany. The diary, sometimes referred to in Latin as 'The Itinera in Hispaniam, Viennam et Constantinopolim' (Voyages to Spain, Vienna and Constantinople) is written in 16th-century French and ended up in the collection of Prince Eugene of Savoy. It is now kept at the Österreichische Nationalbibliothek in Vienna. In the diaries he deals separately with the three trips he made. In particular his report on his stay in Turkey is of great interest as it contains his drawings of the local people he met in Turkey as well as of some official engagements he attended. The diary further contains several pages with the signatures and short messages of persons Wyts met on his travels, so that the diary also constitutes a form of Album Amicorum.

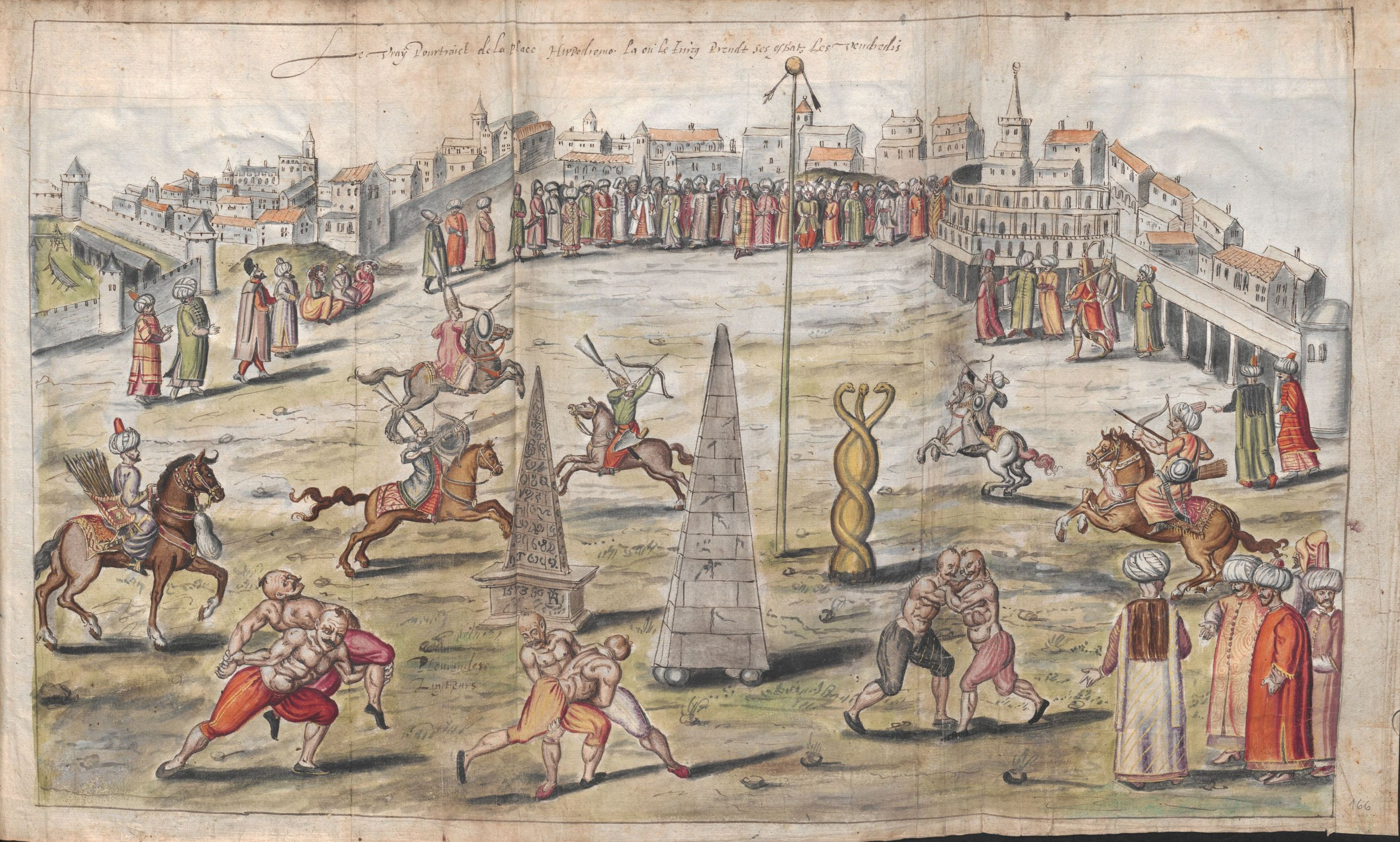
The hippodrome

He included in his diary water color drawings of the Sultan, the reception of the ambassadors and various costumes and customs of the peoples living in Constantinople. These drawings call to mind the 'Turkish costume books', a genre in Western art that became popular from the 16th century. The Flemish painter Pieter Coecke van Aelst's widow Mayken Verhulst published in 1553 a nearly five-metre-long monumental frieze entitled Ces Moeurs et fachons de faire de Turcz (Customs and Fashions of the Turks). It records van Aelst's impressions collected during his journey to Constantinople which he made in 1533 as part of the retinue of the Habsburg diplomat Cornelis de Schepper. The French geographer and courtier Nicolas de Nicolay followed with his Quatre premiers livres des navigations (Four first book of travels) published in 1567, which recorded de Nicolay's observations about the Ottoman court and peoples collected during his 1551 mission to Constantinople. The text was illustrated with 60 images engraved after original drawings by de Nicolay.

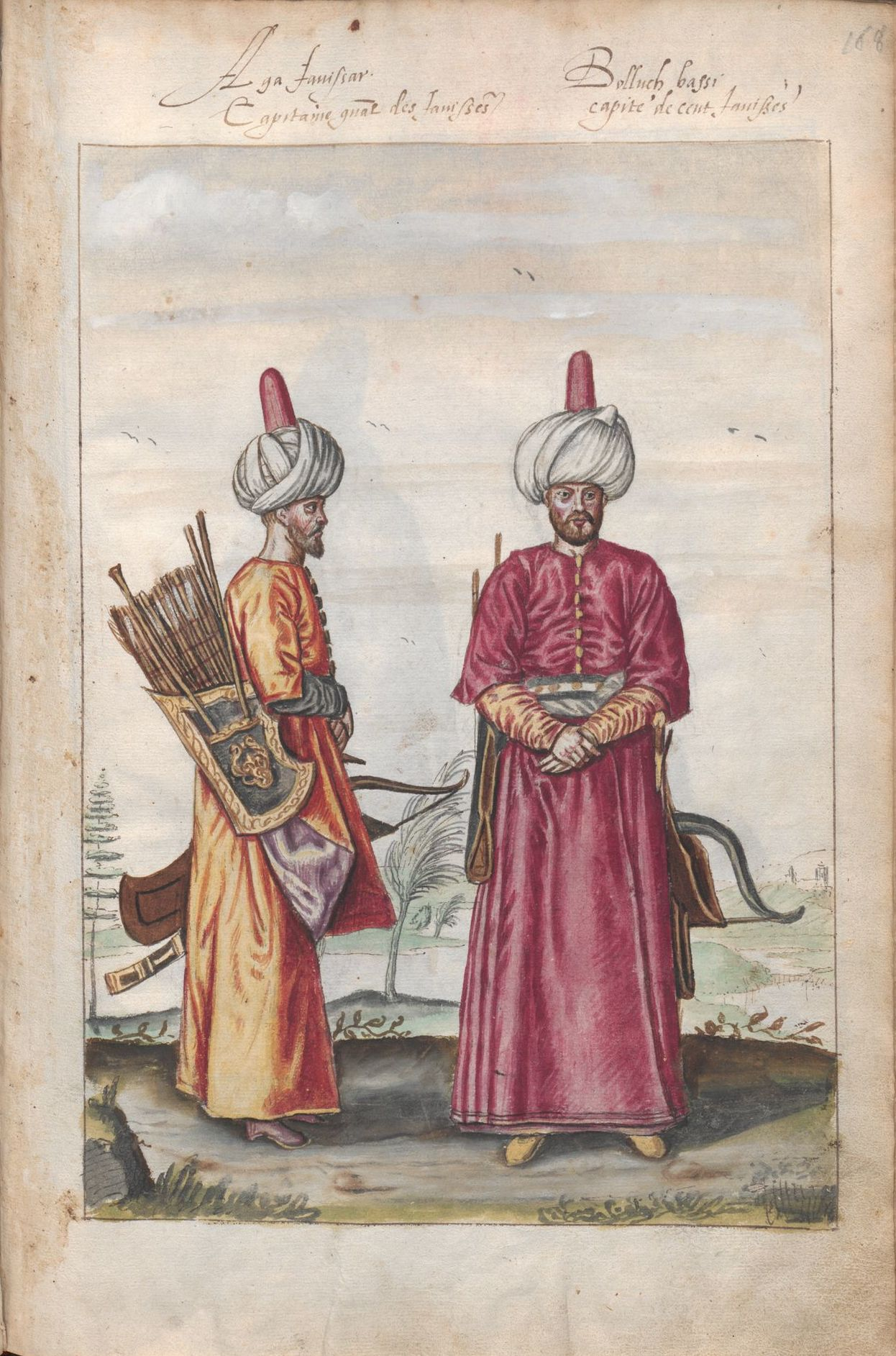
Agha of the Janissaries and a Bölük of the Janissaries.jpg

About 120 costume books or portions of them are currently known in manuscript, in addition to a large number of prints. With the rise of the Ottoman Empire both militarily and politically, the European nations wanted to learn how to deal with this new power. This created an interest in pictorial representations of Turkish buildings and people which gave an impetus to the genre of the Turkish costume book. These depictions familiarized Europeans with the exotic ways of the Turks and gave them clues to how Ottoman society worked. Not only did they serve as guides for diplomats and other visitors to the Sultan’s court, but they also satisfied the curiosity and quelled the fear that westerners felt for the Ottomans. These costume books were also meant to entertain the European audiences for which they were intended. Amateur and professional artists aimed to satisfy the demand for such representations. Another Fleming who created a costume book is Lambert de Vos, a trained artist from Mechelen who traveled to and resided in Constantinople in 1572, the same year as Wyts. Wyts has sometimes been confused with Lambert de Vos. In the beginning, most artists were European but from the 18th century such costume books were also produced by local artists in response to the demand for such illustrated publications.

=== Voyage to Spain ===
His first trip described in his diary was a trip he took to Spain as a courtier accompanying Anna of Austria, the daughter of Emperor Maximilian II on her way to get married with the King Philip II of Spain in 1570. The future queen had set out from Prague in the company of her brothers, the Archdukes Albert and Wenceslaus. In September 1570 Wyts joined the party in Antwerp from which they set out and traveled by ship via Zeeland to Spain. He recounts that in the vicinity of the Isle of Wight, a helmsman of one of the ships in the convoy caused a near collision with the ship of Anna of Austria. The helmsman was grabbed and thrown into the sea. He describes the dress of the women of Biscaye and recounts that the party of Anna of Austria was met by 2,000 envoys of the king of Spain, including about 50 musicians. The party travelled on via Burgos and Valladolid to Segovia. The royal wedding took place in Segovia on 14 November and the new Queen made her entry into Madrid on 27 November.

Wyts remained in Madrid for another half year. He travelled during that time to Toledo with three fellow Flemings. He describes the presence of a large contingent of Flemish artisans working on various projects for the king including the construction and administration of the Royal Palace of El Pardo, Aranjuez and El Escorial. When the Archdukes left Madrid in May 1571 to travel to Barcelona to embark on the return trip, Wyts left not long after and caught up with them in Aranjuez on 10 June. He left ahead of the Archdukes to travel to Barcelona where he had to attend to some business. Here he had to wait for the arrival of the ships that would take them to Genoa. The flotilla of ships, commanded by John of Austria (the illegitimate son of Emperor Charles V, left the port of Barcelona on 17 July and arrived in Genoa on the 26th. They traveled on via Piacenza and Mantua to Innsbruck. He writes in glowing terms about the statue of emperor Maximilian I in Innsbruck created by his fellow Fleming Alexander Colyn. He traveled on to Vienna where he arrived on 26 August and remained at the Imperial court until 16 April 1572.

=== Voyage to Turkey ===
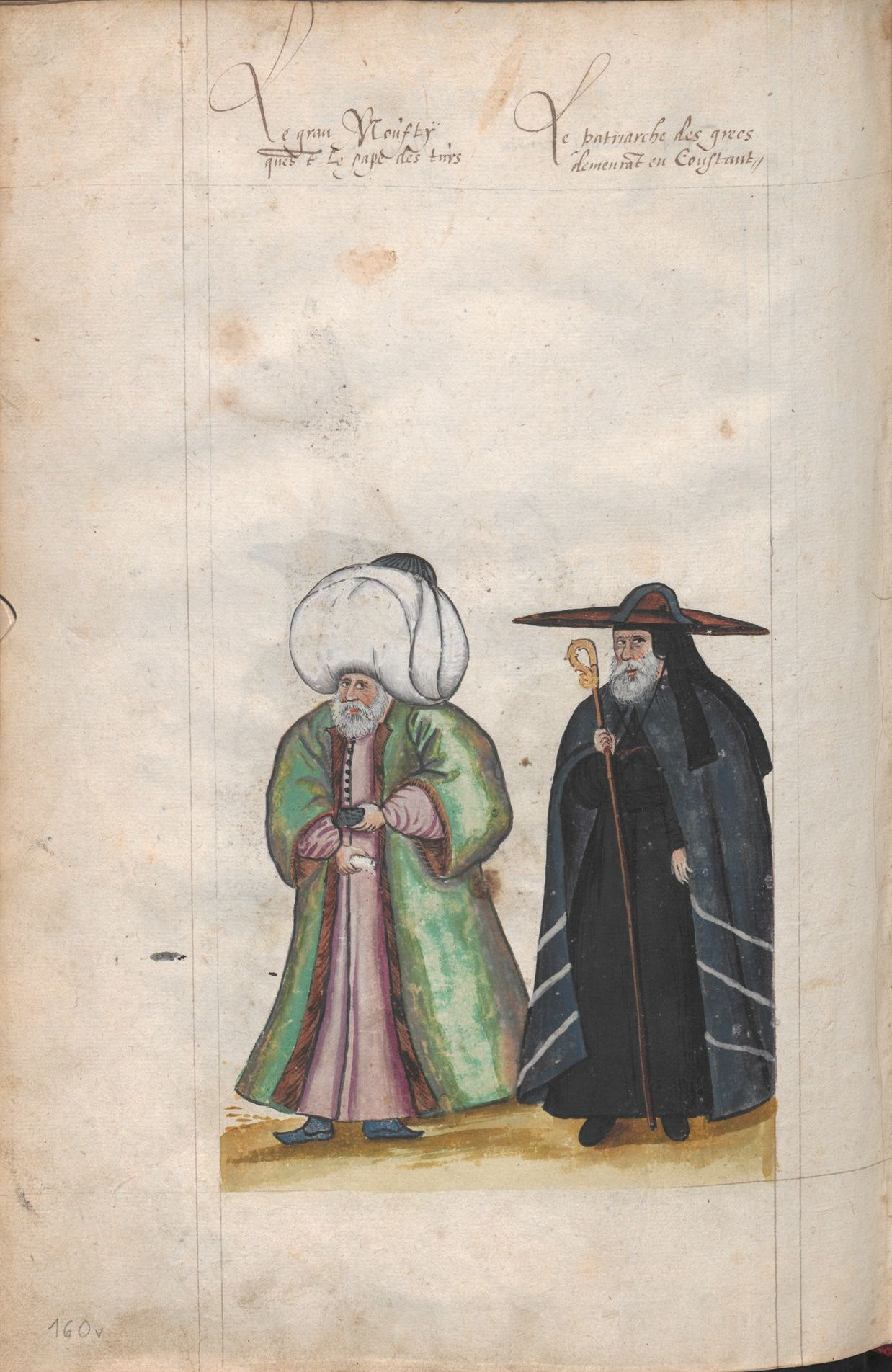
The Grand Mufti and the Patriarch of the Greek Church residing in Constantinople

Wyts states that he took the second trip described in his diary to satisfy his desire for travel. He managed to join the retinue of 20 people who accompanied David Ungnad von Sonnegg, the emperor's envoy to the Sultan of Turkey, on his mission to Constantinople to deliver tribute offerings to the Sultan. The party set off on 16 April 1572 descending the Danube to Belgrade, and passing through Buda. From Belgrade the trip was continued over land. After arriving in Constantinople on 15 June 1572 they first had an audience with the Vizier Mehmet and a few days later with the Sultan Selim II. Wyts describes the audience with some detail, including a physical description of the Sultan and a discussion on religion between the Sultan and the European ambassadors. The drawing he made of the audience with the Sultan shows the Sultan seated in the centre on a throne underneath an arched building. The building's style is similar to that of architecture in Flanders at the time. Three people are lying prostrate before the Sultan. The Sultan is watching the foreign envoys hand over the annual tribute to his servants. One of the presents is a golden table clock the hands of which are visible. In other remarks in his account on his trip to Turkey, Wyts notes that Constantinople is a city with residents of various backgrounds such as Greek, Turks and Jews. Their mission completed, the imperial envoys and Wyts left Constantinople on 24 August 1572. He was sick during the first days of the return trip, which ended in Bratislava, where he remained for a while and witnessed the crowning of Rudolf II as king of Hungary.

The part of his book on his voyage to Turkey has various appendices which deal with matters such as the crowning of Rudolf II, the life and teachings of Muhammed, Muslim laws and the Turkish customs, ceremonies, superstitions and justice system, the Turkish manner of taking baths and also the 73 drawings he had made of civil and military costumes including the portrait of the Sultan.

=== Voyage to Germany ===
He commences his account of his trip through Germany with a long description of Vienna. He set out on 16 April 1573 and traveled via Linz, Salzburg, Munich, Augsburg, Ulm, Speyer, Worms, Frankfurt, Mainz, Koblenz, Cologne and Aachen. A few days out, he ran into Count Paul de Salm, grand sommelier of the duke of Lorraine. He was invited to join de Salm's party on its return to Lorraine. He separated from de Salm on 8 May in Neuhaus. From Aachen on he traveled on via Maastricht, Antwerp, Brussels, Leuven, Namur and finally Dinant where he met his mother in her home on 2 June 1575. This is where his book ends.
