= Lambert de Vos =

Flemish painter and draughtsman

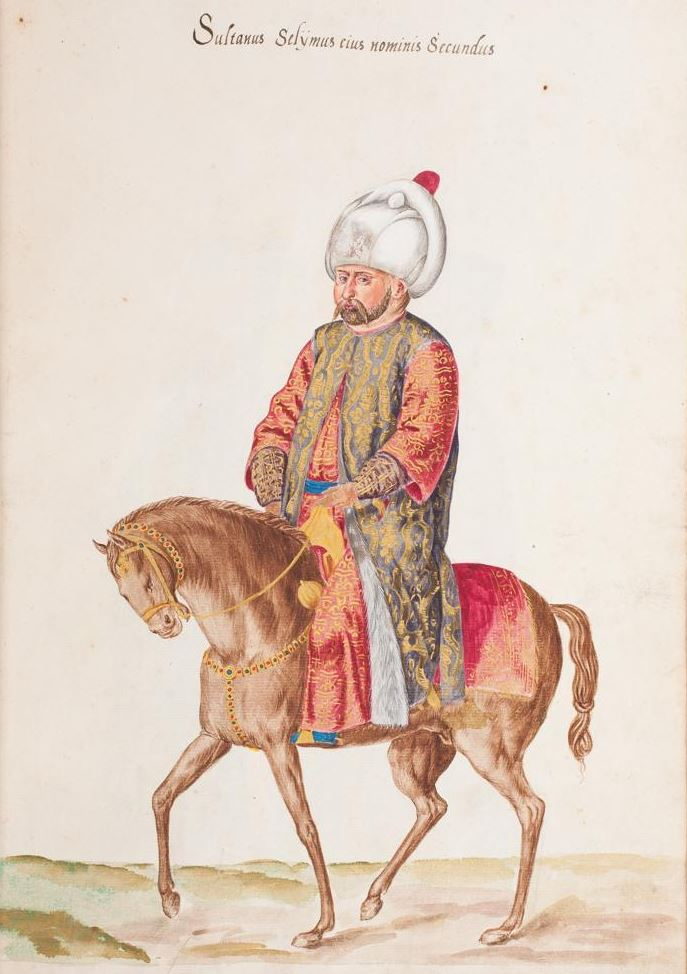
Sultan Selim II, 1574 Costume Book

Lambert de Vos (fl 1563 – 1574) was a Flemish painter and draughtsman from Mechelen who travelled to Constantinople to work for the diplomatic mission of the Habsburg Empire. Here he made a number of drawings of the various local costumes and some of the architectural sights. His drawings serve as an important source of information on the dress of people living in the Turkish empire and the architecture of Constantinople during his residence.

== Life ==
Very little is known about the life of de Vos. He was likely born in Mechelen where he was first admitted to the local Guild of St. Luke in the year 1563. As it was common to become a master at the age of 25, he was likely born around 1538.

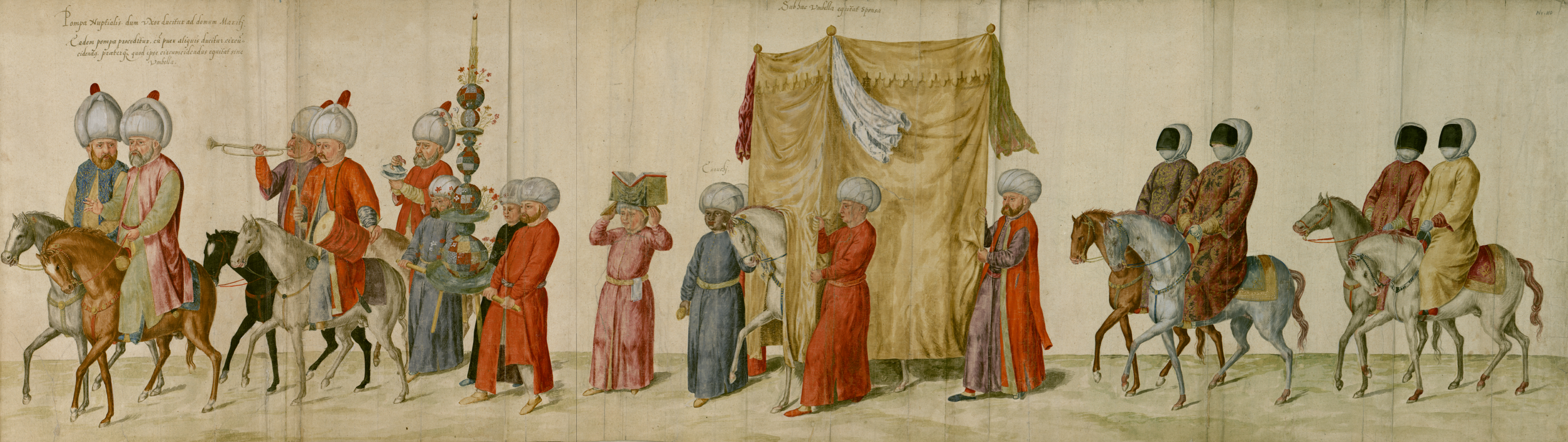
Wedding procession, Costume Book, Gennadius Library

In 1572 he travelled to Constantinople where he was active in the circle of diplomats and envoys of the Habsburg Empire. It is recorded that he made in 1574 a Costume Book for Karel Rijm, Emperor Maximilian II's ambassador to the Sublime Porte, the central government of the Ottoman Empire.

Not much is known about the remainder of the life and work of the artist. He was recorded again as a master in the Mechelen Guild of St. Luke in the year 1573.

== The Costume Book of 1574 ==
The Costume Book of 1574 is in the manuscript collection (ms. Or. 9 (1574)) of the Staats- und Universitätsbibliothek Bremen (State and University Library of Bremen) in Germany. The book comprises 124 sheets, 103 of which are numbered. A Genoese paper was used, which was smoothed in an oriental manner, giving it a silky sheen. Four sections can be distinguished in the work: the Sultan and his courtiers, Ottoman men and clergy, Ottoman women and ethnic and religious minorities. Lambert de Vos has sketched the fashion and social hierarchy among the Ottomans in vivid colours. The Costume Book of 1574 is usually associated with two illustrations: the portrait of Sultan Selim II and a long bridal train drawn over several leaves. The first 50 pages portray the sultan's ceremonial procession with 95 men some on horseback, including Sultan Selim II. This was a ritual procession that wound its way through the streets of Constantinople and represented the Empire's hierarchy. Under Selim II's predecessor, Suleiman the Magnificent, this procession had become a grand pageant that represented the splendor of the Empire at its zenith, as shown in a print dated 1553 made after a drawing by the Flemish artist Pieter Coecke van Aelst who had visited Constantinople in 1533.

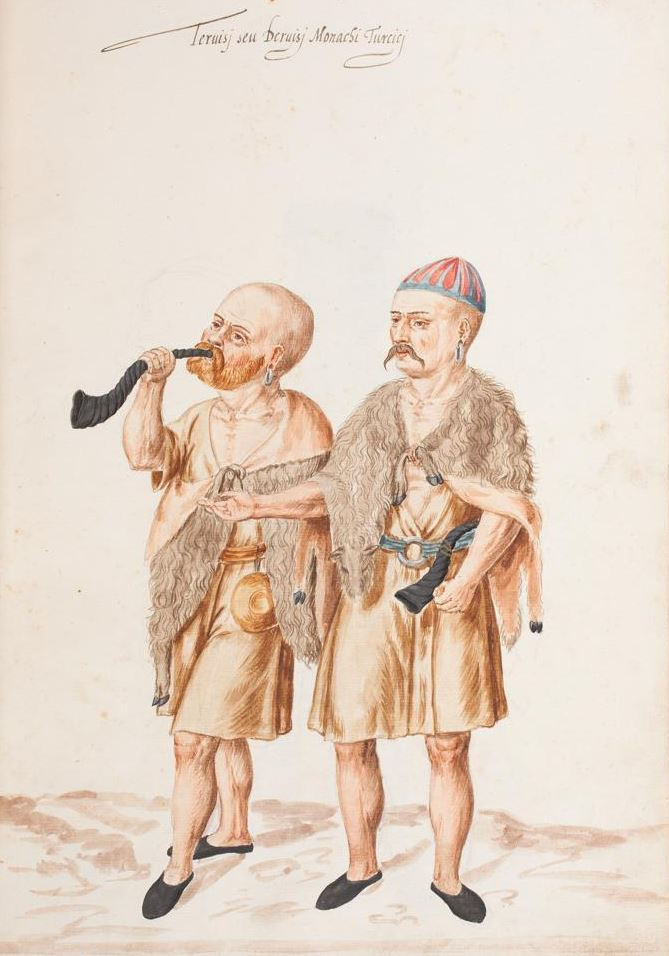
Sectarian monks

The 'Turkish costume book' became a well-known genre in Western art starting from the 16th century. Pieter Coecke van Aelst's widow Mayken Verhulst published a nearly five-metre-long monumental frieze entitled Ces Moeurs et fachons de faire de Turcz (Customs and Fashions of the Turks), which records the artist's impressions collected during his journey to Constantinople which he made in 1533 as part of the retinue of the Habsburg diplomat Cornelis de Schepper. The French geographer and courtier Nicolas de Nicolay followed with his Quatre premiers livres des navigations (Four first book of travels) published in 1567, which recorded de Nicolay's observations about the Ottoman court and peoples from his 1551 mission to Constantinopel. The text was illustrated with 60 images engraved after original drawings by de Nicolay. These early examples of costume books were followed by others. About 120 costume books or portions of them are currently known in manuscript, in addition to a large number of prints. With the rise of the Ottoman Empire both militarily and politically, the European nations had an interest in learning how to deal with this new power. This created an interest in pictorial representations of Turkish people which gave an impetus to the genre of the Turkish costume book. These depictions familiarized Europeans with the exotic ways of the Turks and gave them clues to how Ottoman society worked. Not only did they serve as guides for diplomats and other visitors to the Sultan's court, but they also satisfied the curiosity and quelled the fear that westerners felt for the Ottomans. These costume books were also meant to entertain the European audiences for which they were intended.

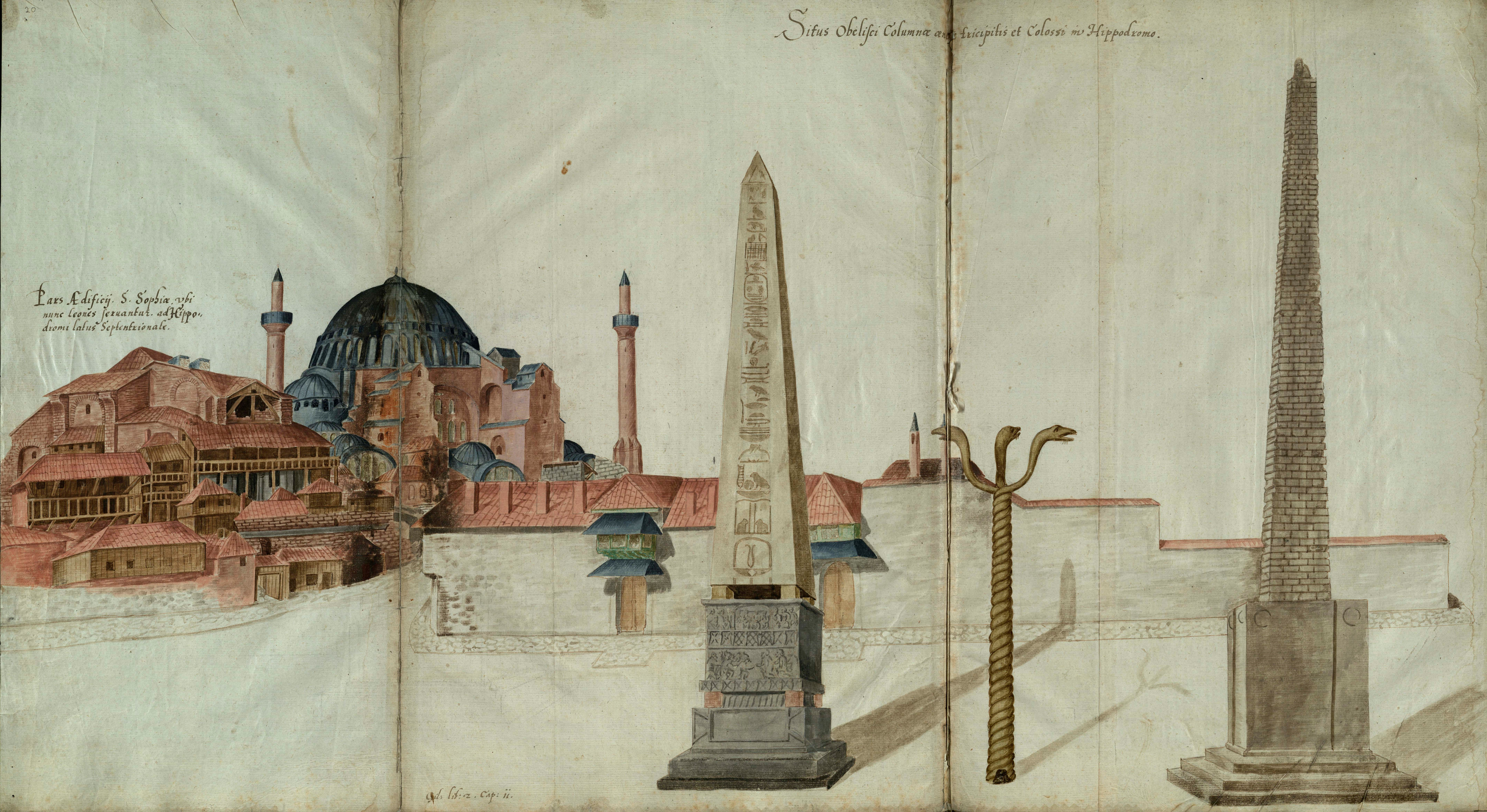
The Hagia Sophia, Freshfield Album

Amateur and professional artists aimed to satisfy the demand for such representations. Lambert Wyts was a Flemish courtier who left a diary (kept at the Österreichische Nationalbibliothek) of his 1572 voyage to Constantinople which contains a series of drawings in the nature of those found in a costume book. His work has sometimes been confused with that of de Vos. In the beginning, most artists were European but from the 18th century such costume books were also produced by local artists in response to the demand for such illustrated publications.

The Gennadius Library in Athens has a copy of a Costume Book (MS A. 986), which is attributed to de Vos or his workshop. Another copy of the book is kept in the Bibliothèque nationale, Paris (1590, Moeurs et costumes des Pays Orientaux, Département des Estampes, OD. 2). The manuscripts differ in quality as well as in the number, order and coloring of the images and they probably constitute different versions of the drawings. The Stammbuch Kurfürst Augusts (Family album of Elector Augustus) in the Kupferstich-Kabinett, Dresden (Inv. Ca 114a) contains six Turkish costume drawings which based on style could be attributable to de Vos.

== The Freshfield Album ==
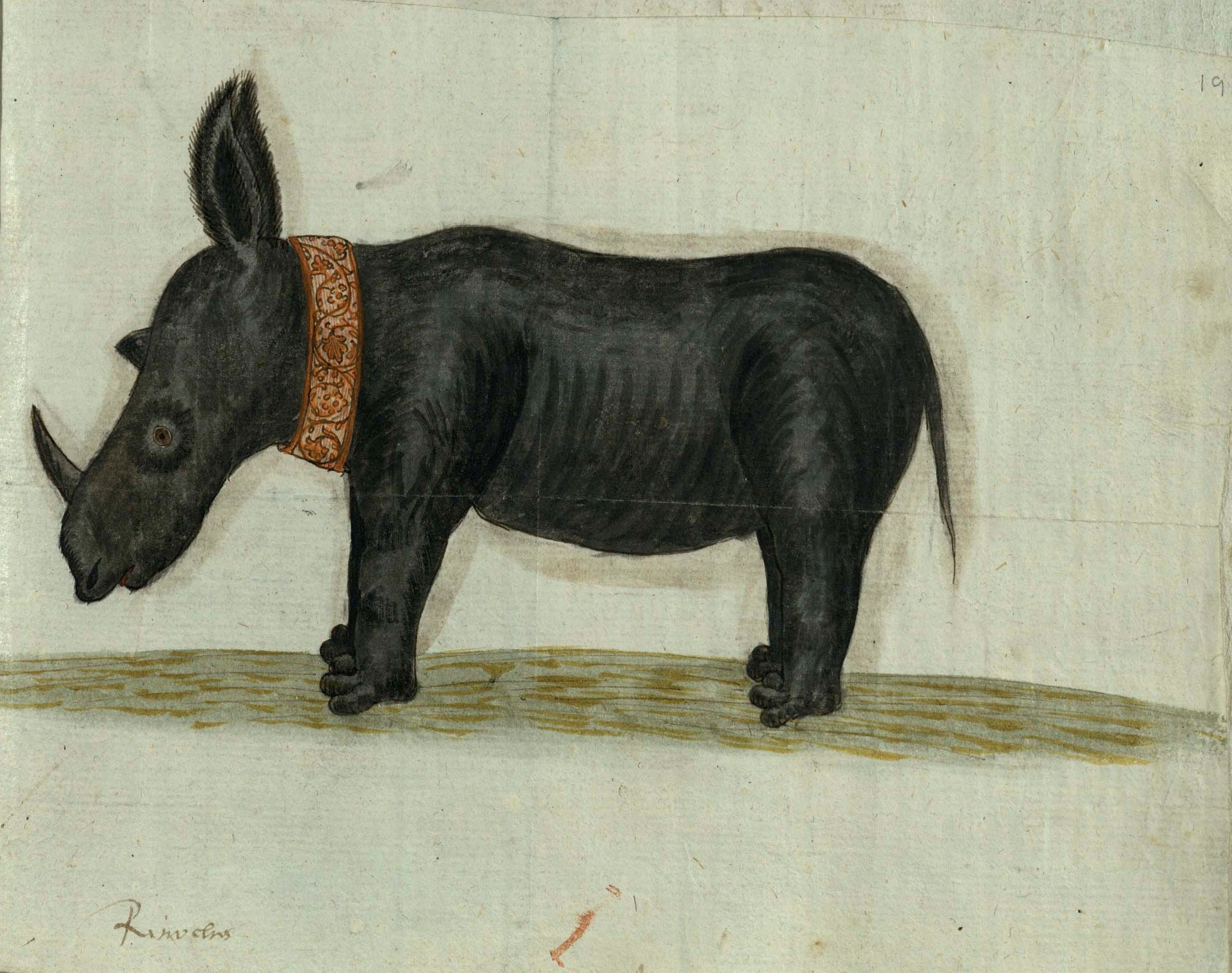
Rhinoceros, Freshfield Album

An anonymous manuscript in the Wren Library at Trinity College in Cambridge (ms. O.17.2) referred to as the Freshfield Album has been attributed to de Vos. The attribution to de Vos is based on is stylistic affinity with the drawings in the Costume Book of 1574 and on the dating (some sheets bear the date 1574, the same date as the 'Costume Book'). The album consists of a simple gathering of folio sheets sewn into a plain vellum wrapper. It contains 21 water colours that depict the architecture of Constantinople.

The drawings are so detailed that it is possible that they were meant to serve as designs for copperplate engravings, but no evidence has yet been found that the drawings were thus reproduced in print. It was likely that the drawings were intended to accompany the Costume Book. There are also two drawings of young rhinoceroses from Abyssinia (Ethiopia). These animals were likely destined for the menagerie of the Sultan. While later than Albrecht Dürer's famous woodcut of 1515, these images are among the earliest European depictions of the rhinoceros.

Nine of the pictures depict columns that do not fit a single page and therefore have folded sheets attached to extend them. Some of the drawings are accompanied by notes based on the publication De topographia Constantinopoleos of French topographer Pierre Gilles, first printed in 1561. Thanks to its panoramas and detailed rendering, the Freshfield Album is an important source of topographical and historical information. It has allowed, among other things, a full understanding of the narrative content of the Column of Arcadius, of which now only the base remains.
