= Pieter Meulener =

Flemish painter (1602–1654)

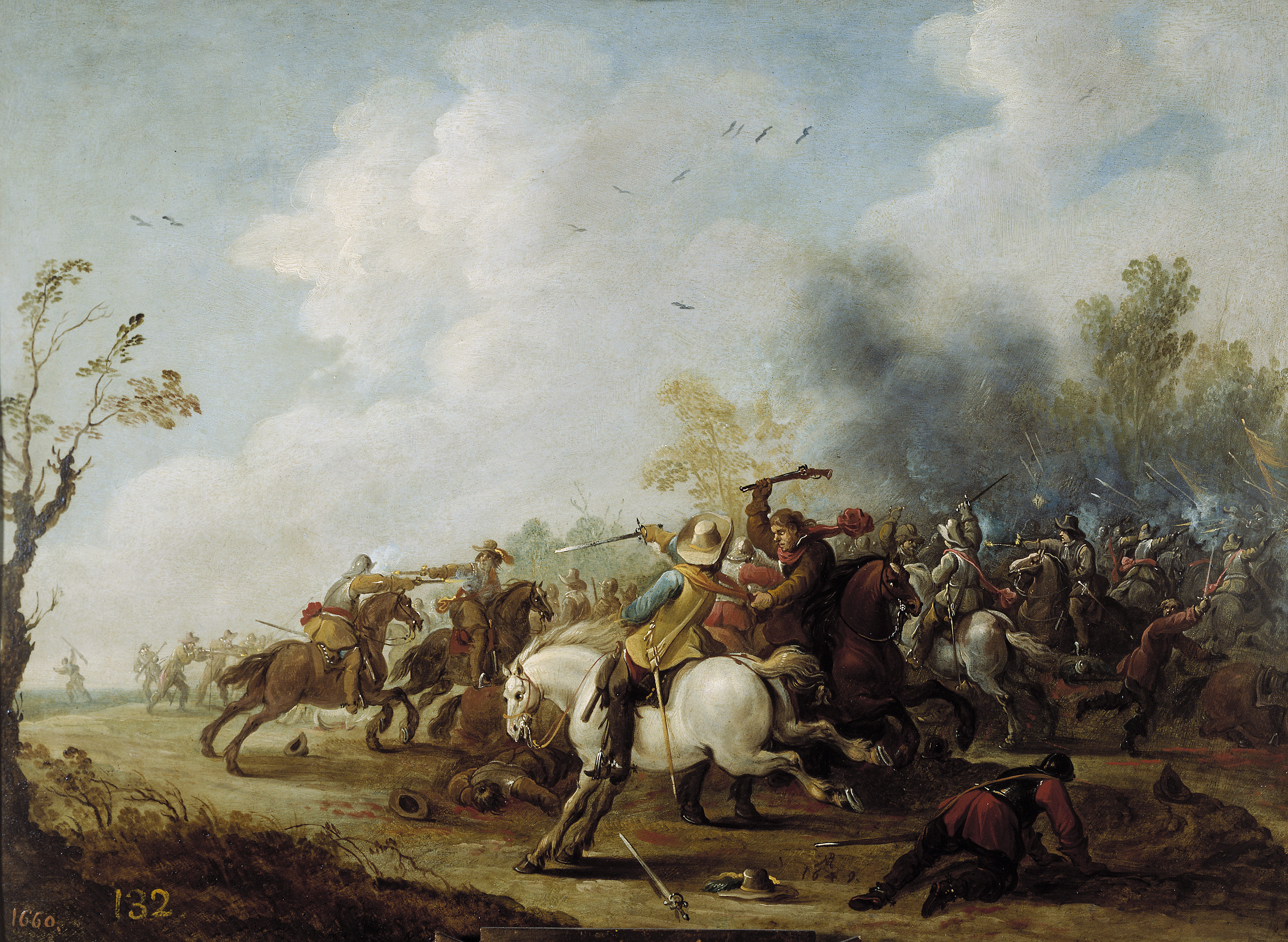
Cavalry skirmish

Pieter Meulener or Peter Meulenaer (Antwerp, baptised 18 February 1602 – Antwerp, 27 November 1654), Antwerp), was one of the leading Flemish painters of battle scenes in the mid-17th century. He also painted landscapes with genre scenes.

== Life ==
Pieter Meulener was born in Antwerp as the son of genre painter Jan de Meuleneer and Elizabeth Floris. He was baptised on 18 February 1602 in Antwerp Cathedral. His grandfather was the Flemish Renaissance painter Cornelis Molenaer who was known for his landscapes. It is assumed that he was trained by his father Jan who had joined the Antwerp Guild of Saint Luke in 1598. Pieter joined the Guild in 1631 as a "wijnmeester" (literally: winemaster), which means he was the son or brother of a current member. He likely got married the same year to Maria Hendrickx.

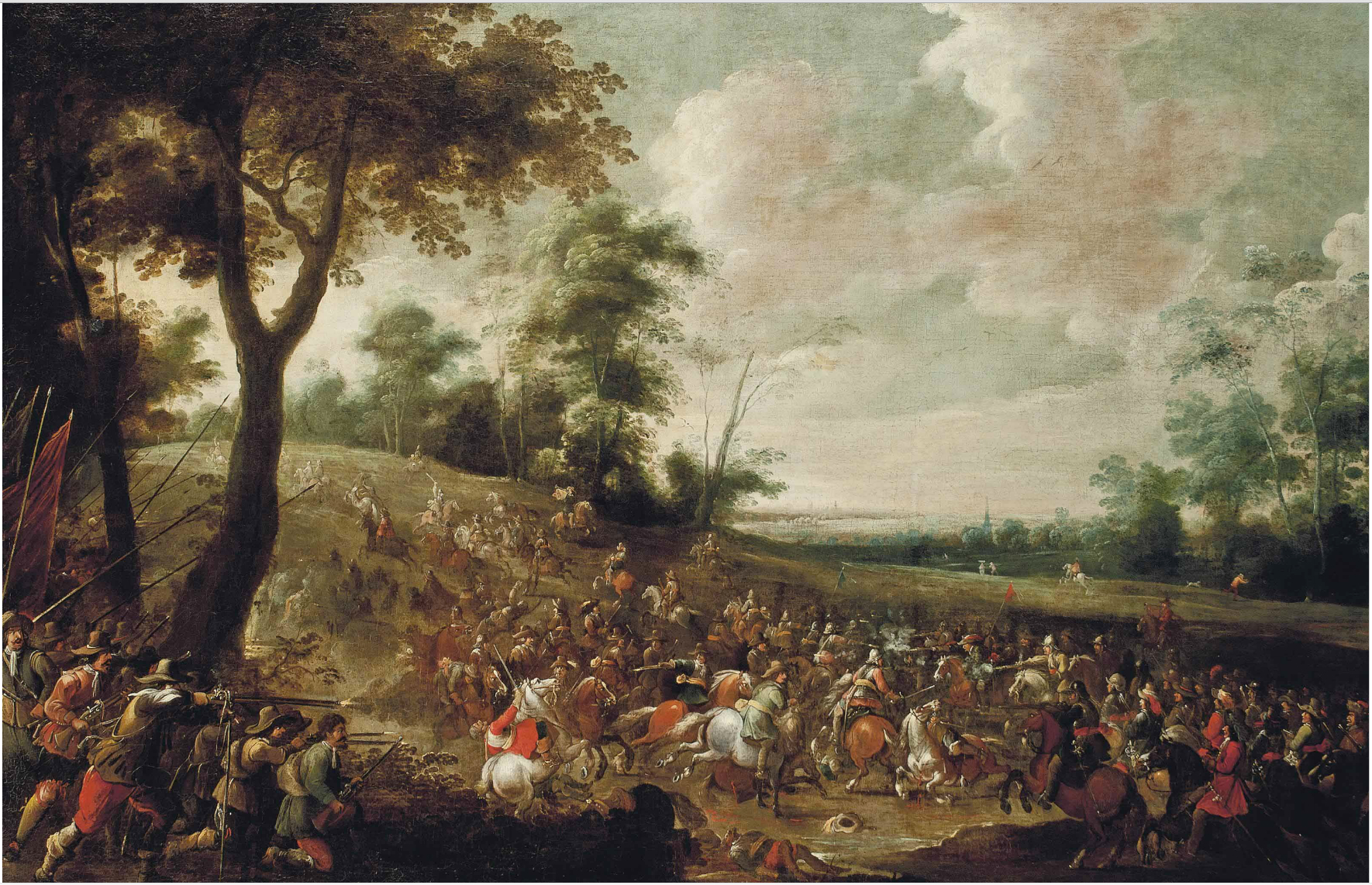
A cavalry skirmish

SInce no early dated works have been discovered, it is likely he initially assisted his father in his workshop. He started out on his own account in 1642.

He was successful as he was able to rent a luxurious residence. When he died in 1654 he was recorded as having one daughter of 20 years old and a son of 15 years old.

== Work ==
=== General ===
He was able to establish a reputation as a leading battle painter of battles but was also known for his landscapes. His works are usually dated and signed with "P.MEVLENER". He occasionally used the monogram "PM" (in ligature; the P centrally on top of the M). The works signed with this monogram have long been considered as by Pieter de Molijn.

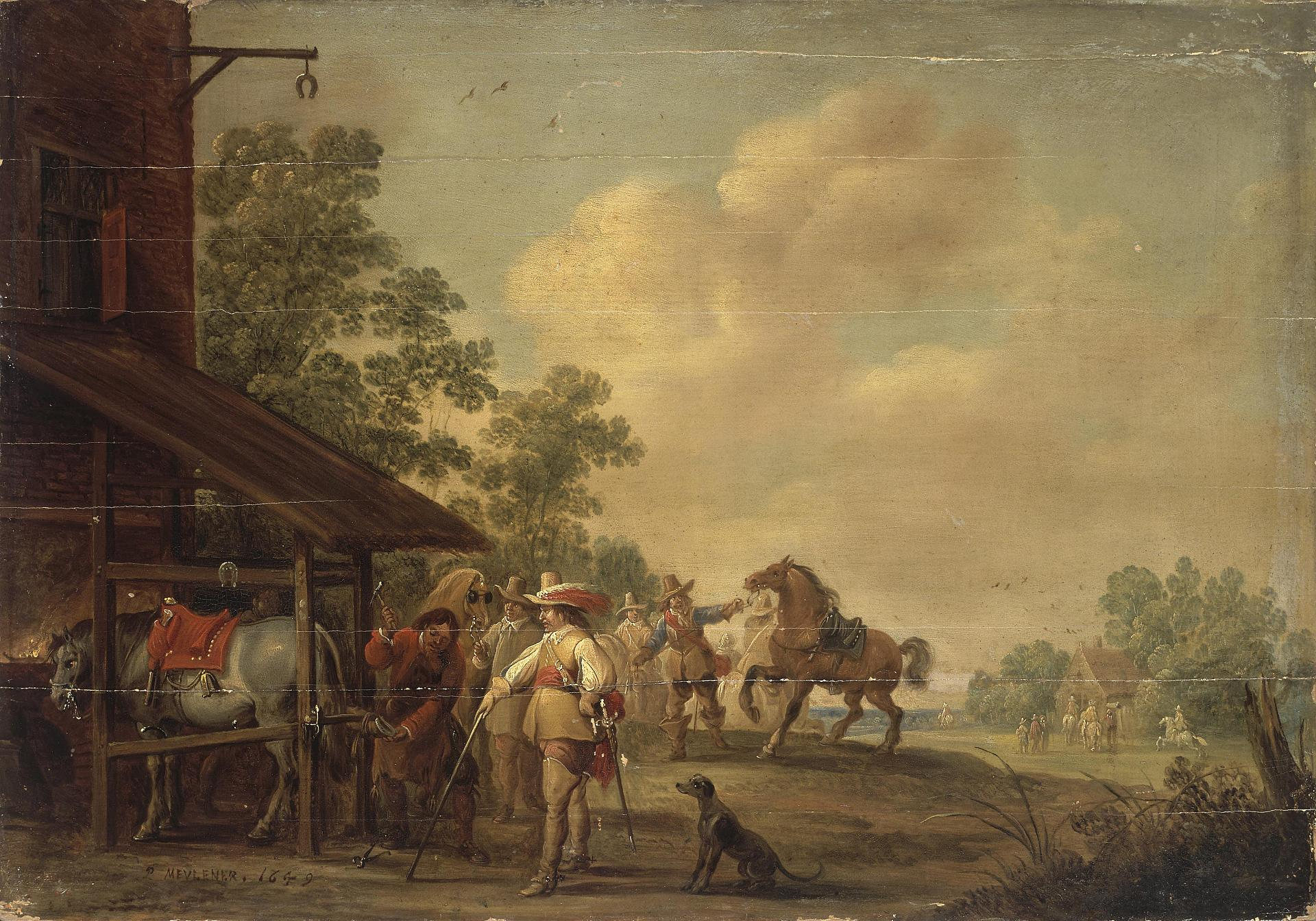
A forge

His works can be found in leading museums including the Prado Museum, the Hermitage Museum, the Rijksmuseum and the Louvre.

=== Battle scenes ===
His battle scenes depict cavalry skirmishes, attacks on military convoys and on travellers, depicting those subjects from the Flemish side in the Eighty Years' War and the Thirty Years' War. His preferred theme was cavalry engagements and his usual way of representing these was to place a dense cavalry skirmish in a certain area of the composition. Whereas some Flemish war artists such as Peter Snayers painted battle scenes which depicted real battles in a topographical and analytical manner, Meulener only aimed to represent the battles in a general form. His battle scenes show similarities with those of Sebastiaen Vrancx, the first Flemish artist to attempt this subject matter. Some historians believe Meulener may have studied under Vrancx.

His palette is closer to that of Peter Snayers, who studied under Sebastiaen Vrancx. After 1645 his colour became clearer under the influence of Dutch battle scene painters, such as Pieter de Neyn, Jan Jacobsz. van der Stoffe and Abraham van der Hoef and in particular Palamedes Palamedesz. (I), to the extent that their battle scenes can be confused.

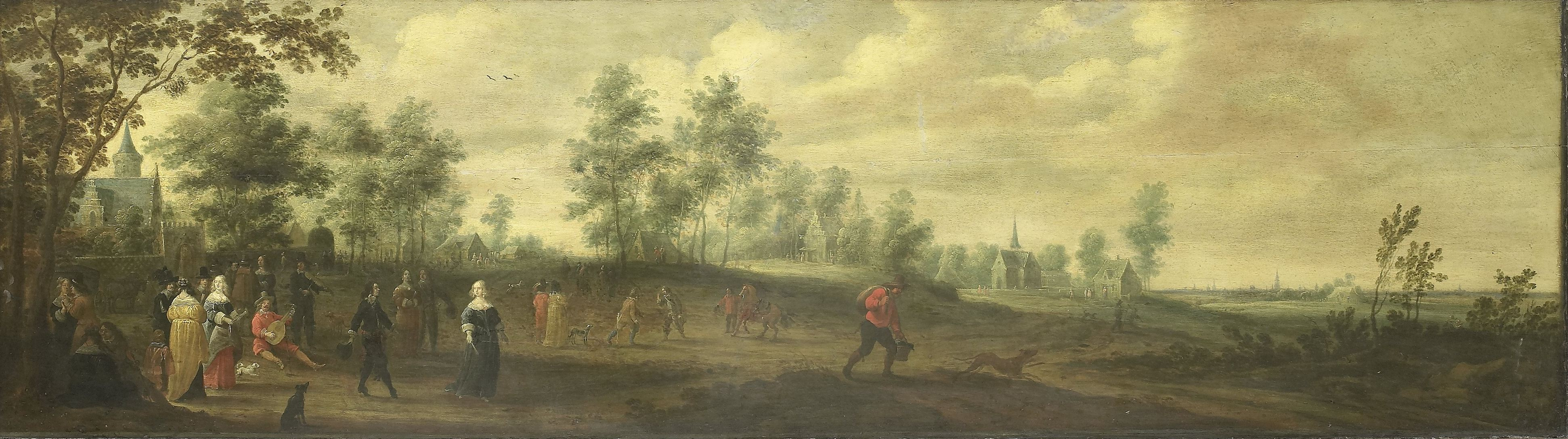
Landscape with a dancing couple

=== Landscapes ===
His landscapes typically include genre scenes. An interesting example is the Landscape with a Dancing Couple dated 1645. It is painted on the decorated lid of an Antwerp harpsichord. The landscape shows a landscape outside a village where a group of people are enjoying outdoor activities. On the left a couple is dancing to the music of a lute player and a violinist. On the right stands a man with a bag over his shoulder.

If the work View of Hemiksem Castle sold at Sotheby's in its London sale of 9 June 1982 as Lot 110 is indeed by Peter Meulener, then it appears that he also painted topographical landscapes.

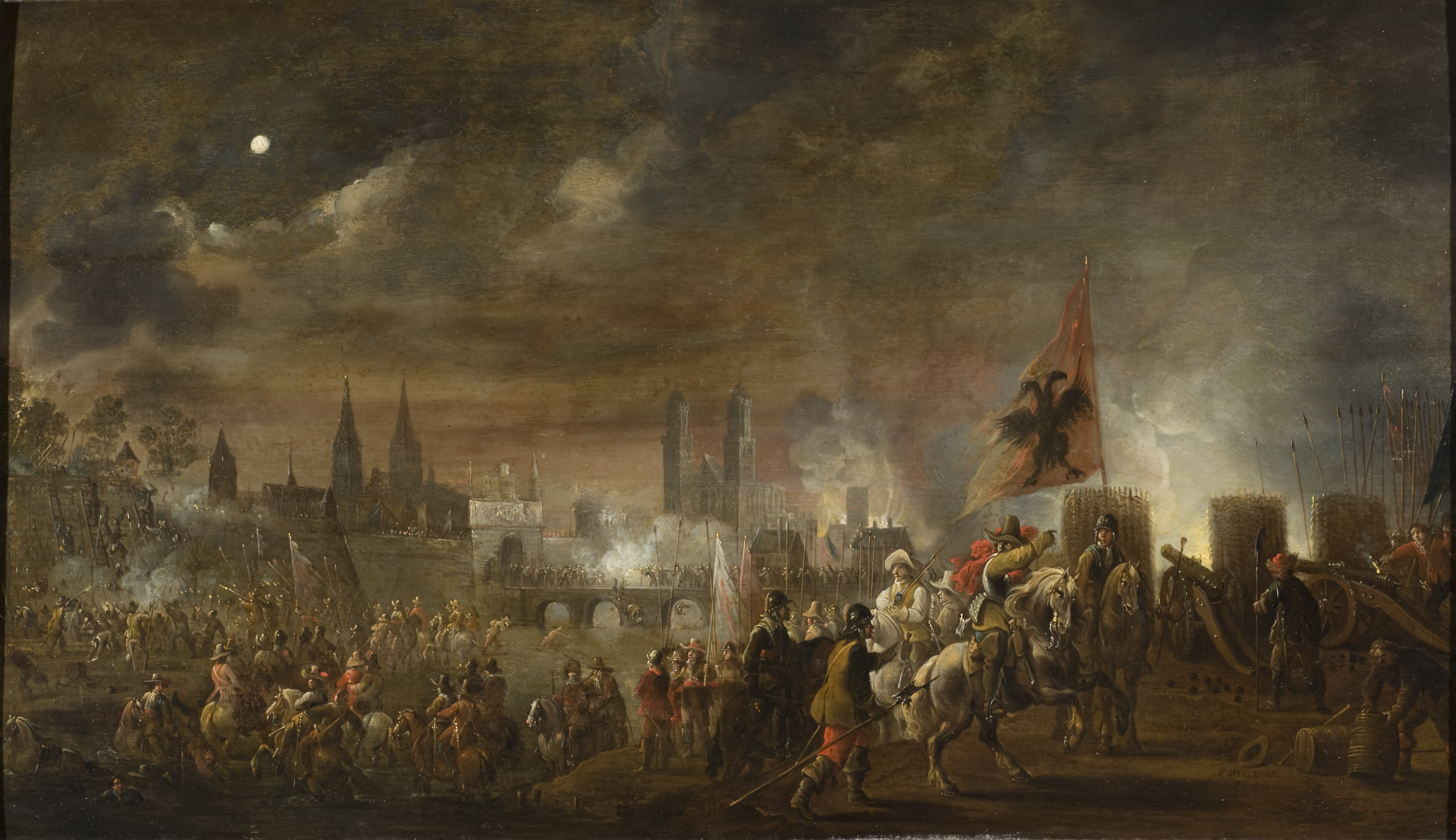
The Siege of Magdeburg of 1631

=== Collaborations ===
As was the custom in Antwerp in the 17th century, Meulener collaborated with other artists on compositions. An illustration of such collaboration is An extensive landscape with a cavalry skirmish on a ridge (Sold at Christie's on 6 July 2007 in London, Lot 147) in which he painted the staffage and David Teniers the Younger the landscape.
