= Anna Tummers =

Dutch art historian and curator (born 1974)

- Born: 1974 (age 51–52)
- Known for: Connoisseurship; art authentication; technical examination of paintings; Dutch and Flemish seventeenth-century art

Academic background
- Education: University of Amsterdam (PhD)
- Thesis: 'The Fingerprint of an Old Master: On Connoisseurship of Dutch and Flemish Seventeenth-Century Paintings: Recent Debates and Seventeenth-Century Insights' (2009)
- Doctoral advisor: Eric Jan Sluijter

Anna Tummers (born 1974) is a Dutch art historian, curator, researcher, and professor whose work centres on Dutch Golden Age painting and Flemish painting, particularly the art of the seventeenth century. She is known for combining historical connoisseurship with technical examination, digital imaging, computer science, and other scientific methods used in the attribution and authentication of paintings.

Her scholarship addresses the methods through which specialists distinguish original paintings from studio works, later imitations, and forgeries. It also examines the ethical, cultural, and economic consequences of attribution decisions. Her research has included major studies of Frans Hals, Rembrandt, and their contemporaries, alongside projects devoted to developing new forms of twenty-first-century connoisseurship.

From 2008 until 2021, Tummers served as curator of old masters at the Frans Hals Museum in Haarlem, where she curated and contributed to exhibitions on Frans Hals, Judith Leyster, humour, portraiture, and artistic culture in the Dutch Golden Age. She subsequently returned to academic research and is a professor in Early Modern Art at Ghent University.

== Biography ==
=== Education ===
Tummers studied art history at the University of Amsterdam. During her studies, she participated in a 1996 seminar organized by the Rembrandt Research Project and led by Ernst van de Wetering. The seminar introduced students to attribution research through the close examination of paintings, scientific imaging—including X-radiography, infrared reflectography, and ultraviolet examination—and the interpretation of evidence concerning artists' materials and working methods.

In 1999, she completed a master's thesis titled Behind the Portrait: An Interdisciplinary Analysis of Three Portraits of Pope Leo X at the University of Amsterdam. Her education combined conventional art-historical study with object-based examination and the technical investigation of paintings, subjects that later became central to her work on connoisseurship and attribution.

=== Early museum career: Windsor and Washington, 1999–2003 ===
Anna Tummers began her professional career as a research assistant at the Print Room, Windsor in Windsor Castle, England, from 1999 to 2000. She then moved to the United States, where she served as an assistant curator in Northern Baroque painting at the National Gallery of Art in Washington, D.C., from 2000 to 2003. At the National Gallery, she worked with curator Arthur K. Wheelock Jr. and encountered attribution questions involving Dutch and Flemish seventeenth-century paintings.

Tummers has stated that her experiences in Windsor and Washington led her to begin assembling research notes on seventeenth-century Dutch art theory. Those notes gradually developed into the research project that became her doctoral dissertation. In the introduction to the dissertation, she described her work at the National Gallery as an opportunity to observe specialists addressing questions of authorship and attribution and to examine how connoisseurs reached, revised, and defended their conclusions.

Her relationship with the National Gallery continued after her Washington appointment. The museum credited Tummers with providing the original manuscript, sustained collaboration, and editorial contributions for its 2007 educational publication Painting in the Dutch Golden Age: A Profile of the Seventeenth Century.

=== University of Amsterdam and doctoral research, 2003–2009 ===
From 2003 to 2008, Tummers was a lecturer and research associate at the University of Amsterdam. Her Ghent University profile describes this phase as an appointment as an assistant professor in training and part-time lecturer.

Alongside her teaching, she conducted doctoral research under the supervision of Eric Jan Sluijter. Her dissertation examined the relationship between modern debates about attribution and authenticity and the ideas about artistic authorship, expertise, and judgment found in seventeenth-century sources.

Tummers defended the dissertation, titled The Fingerprint of an Old Master: On Connoisseurship of Dutch and Flemish Seventeenth-Century Paintings: Recent Debates and Seventeenth-Century Insights, at the University of Amsterdam on 16 September 2009. The study addressed the criteria used to distinguish paintings by an individual master from workshop productions, copies, later imitations, and forgeries.

=== Frans Hals Museum, 2008–2020 ===
On 1 November 2008, Tummers became curator of old masters at the Frans Hals Museum in Haarlem, succeeding Pieter Biesboer. Her responsibilities included research into the museum's collection of sixteenth- and seventeenth-century painting, exhibition development, publication, attribution studies, and the technical investigation of works associated with Frans Hals and his artistic circle.

One of her early exhibitions at the museum was Judith Leyster: The First Woman to Become a Master Painter, which ran from 12 December 2009 to 9 May 2010. The exhibition examined Leyster's career, artistic identity, and position within seventeenth-century Haarlem. It had previously been shown at the National Gallery of Art in Washington, D.C., where it was curated by Arthur K. Wheelock Jr. and was on view from 21 June to 29 November 2009.

Tummers later curated or helped develop exhibitions addressing Frans Hals and the wider visual culture of the Dutch seventeenth century. These included Frans Hals: Eye to Eye with Rembrandt, Rubens, and Titian, mounted in 2013 for the museum's centenary, and The Art of Laughter: Humour in the Dutch Golden Age. The latter brought together approximately sixty paintings and examined visual jokes, comic figures, and the role of humour in seventeenth-century Dutch art. Its concept was developed by Tummers with Jasper Hillegers, Elmer Kolfin, and Mariët Westermann.

During her museum tenure, Tummers increasingly connected curatorial connoisseurship with technical imaging and digital analysis. She initiated the research projects Frans Hals or Not Frans Hals (2016–2018) and 21st Century Connoisseurship (2018–2022). These projects examined disputed and difficult attributions involving Hals and evaluated scientific examination methods, comparative technical evidence, and newly developed digital visualization tools.

Tummers remained curator through 2020 and left museum work during the 2020–2021 transition to concentrate on academic research. Research initiated during her Frans Hals Museum years continued after her departure and formed the basis of later collaborative publications concerning Hals's workshop, painting technique, contested attributions, and the role of digital tools in connoisseurship.

=== Return to academia: Leiden and Ghent, 2020–present ===
From 2020 to 2023, Tummers was a lecturer in Early Modern Art and Art Theory at Leiden University, where she continued her research into connoisseurship, attribution, technical art history, and the detection of forgery. In 2023, while affiliated with the Leiden University Centre for the Arts in Society, she received a European Research Council Consolidator Grant for ARTDETECT: A New Connoisseurship: Smart Ways to Detect Forgeries. The project was designed to integrate art-historical analysis, chemical examination, and advanced computer science in the study of forged and authentic paintings.

Tummers subsequently became full professor of Early Modern Art History at Ghent University. Her work there focuses on connoisseurship, forgery, early modern art theory and cultural history, technical analysis, and digital methods for the study of paintings. This academic phase extends the object-based and interdisciplinary approach that developed across her education, early curatorial appointments, and tenure at the Frans Hals Museum.

Tummers's work in art historical research has been described by Myrthe Timmers as being different, "from traditional expertise by using the newest technical analysis methods and computer science."

== Research and grants ==
Tummers heads and co-heads several research projects funded by the Netherlands Organization for Scientific Research. Her European Research Council-funded project has been particularly influential, advancing the field of forgery detection while shedding light on the historical art market and the evolution of artistic techniques, alongside others:

- Frans Hals/Not Frans Hals: A project investigating the criteria for attributing paintings to Frans Hals and exploring new methods in art authentication.
- 21st Century Connoisseurship: A collaboration with Professor Robert Erdmann, focusing on developing advanced technical and digital tools for analyzing seventeenth-century paintings.
- ArtDetect: A project aimed at developing new ways to detect forgeries, supported by the Centre for Global Heritage and Development and the Scientific Advisory Board of IPERION HS.

== Exhibitions ==
Tummers has curated and contributed to several exhibitions at the Frans Hals Museum, including:

- Celebrating in the Golden Age
- The Art of Laughter: Humour in the Dutch Golden Age
- Frans Hals: Eye to Eye with Rembrandt, Rubens, and Titian (2013), celebrating the 100th anniversary of the Frans Hals Museum.

== Publications ==
- The Eye of the Connoisseur: Authenticating Paintings by Rembrandt and His Contemporaries (2011)
- Frans Hals: Eye to Eye with Rembrandt, Rubens, and Titian (2013)
- The Art of Laughter: Humour in the Dutch Golden Age (2018)
- (ed., with Koenraad Jonckheere) Art Market and Connoisseurship (2008)
- First Woman to Become a Master Painter (2008)
- Frans Hals or not Frans Hals: Connoisseurship, Technical Analyses and Digital Tools (2025)

== Selected articles ==
- "Supplementing the Eye: The Technical Analysis of Frans Hals's Paintings – I", in: Burlington Magazine 161 (2019), pp. 934–941.
- 'The New York Malle Babbe: Original, Studio Work, or Forgery?” In Frans Hals: Iconography – Technique – Reputation, edited by Norbert E. Middelkoop and Rudi E.O. Ekkart, 130–54. Amsterdam University Press, 2024. doi:10.2307/jj.22135982.12.
- ‘By his hand: the paradox of seventeenth-century connoisseurship’, pp. 30–66, in Anna Tummers and Koenraad Jonckheere (eds.), Art market and Connoisseurship, a Closer Look at Paintings by Rembrandt, Rubens and their Contemporaries, Amsterdam 2008, ISBN 978-9-0896-4032-1.
- ‘The painter versus the connoisseur? The best judge of pictures in seventeenth-century theory and practice’, pp. 126–147, in Anna Tummers and Koenraad Jonckheere (eds.), Art market and Connoisseurship, a Closer Look at Paintings by Rembrandt, Rubens and their Contemporaries, Amsterdam 2008, ISBN 978-9-0896-4032-1.
