= Jan Nagel (painter) =

Dutch painter (c. 1560–1602)

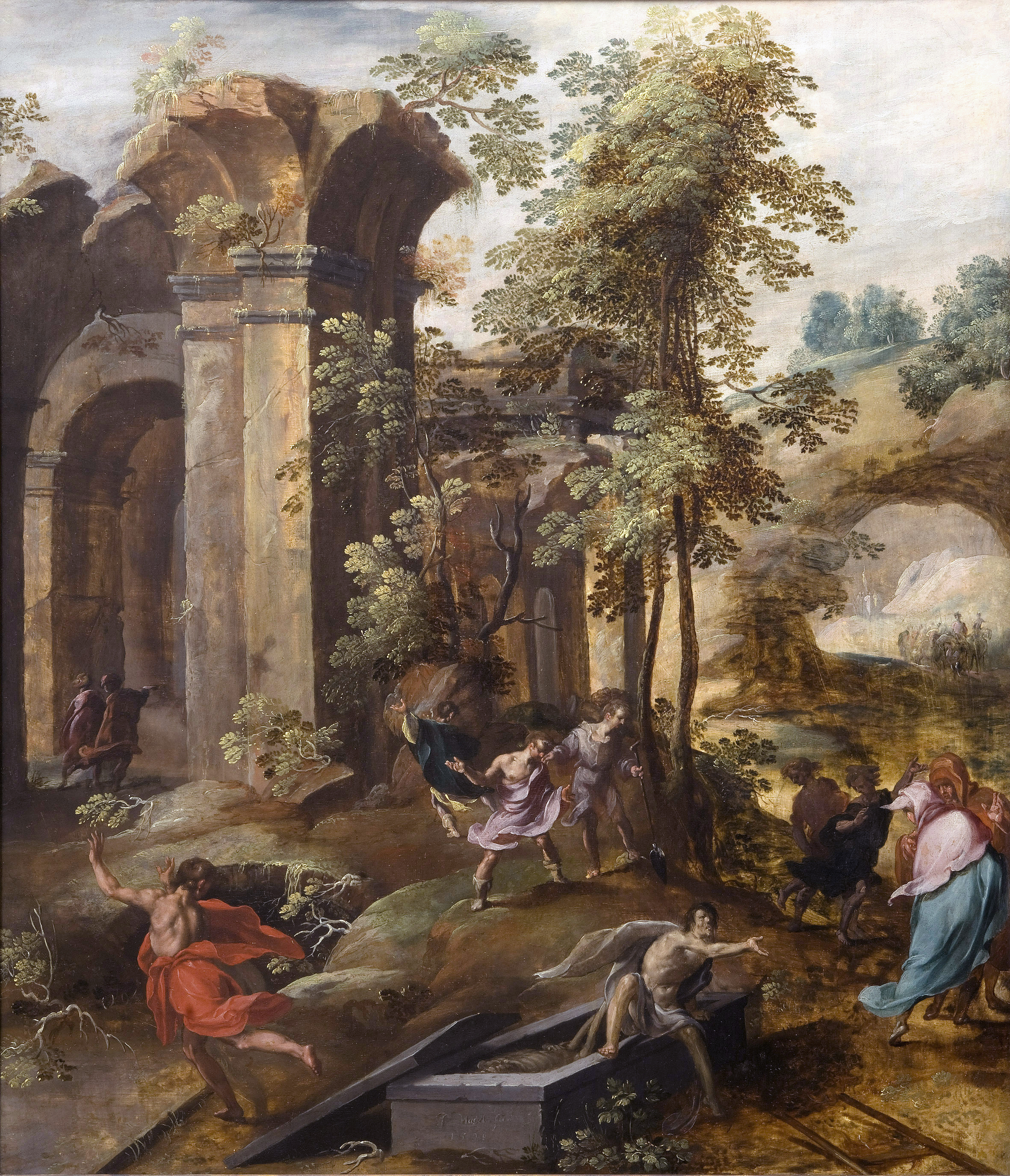
- The Miracle at the Grave of Elisha (1596)
- Born: c. 1560
- Died: 1602; The Hague
- Known for: Painting

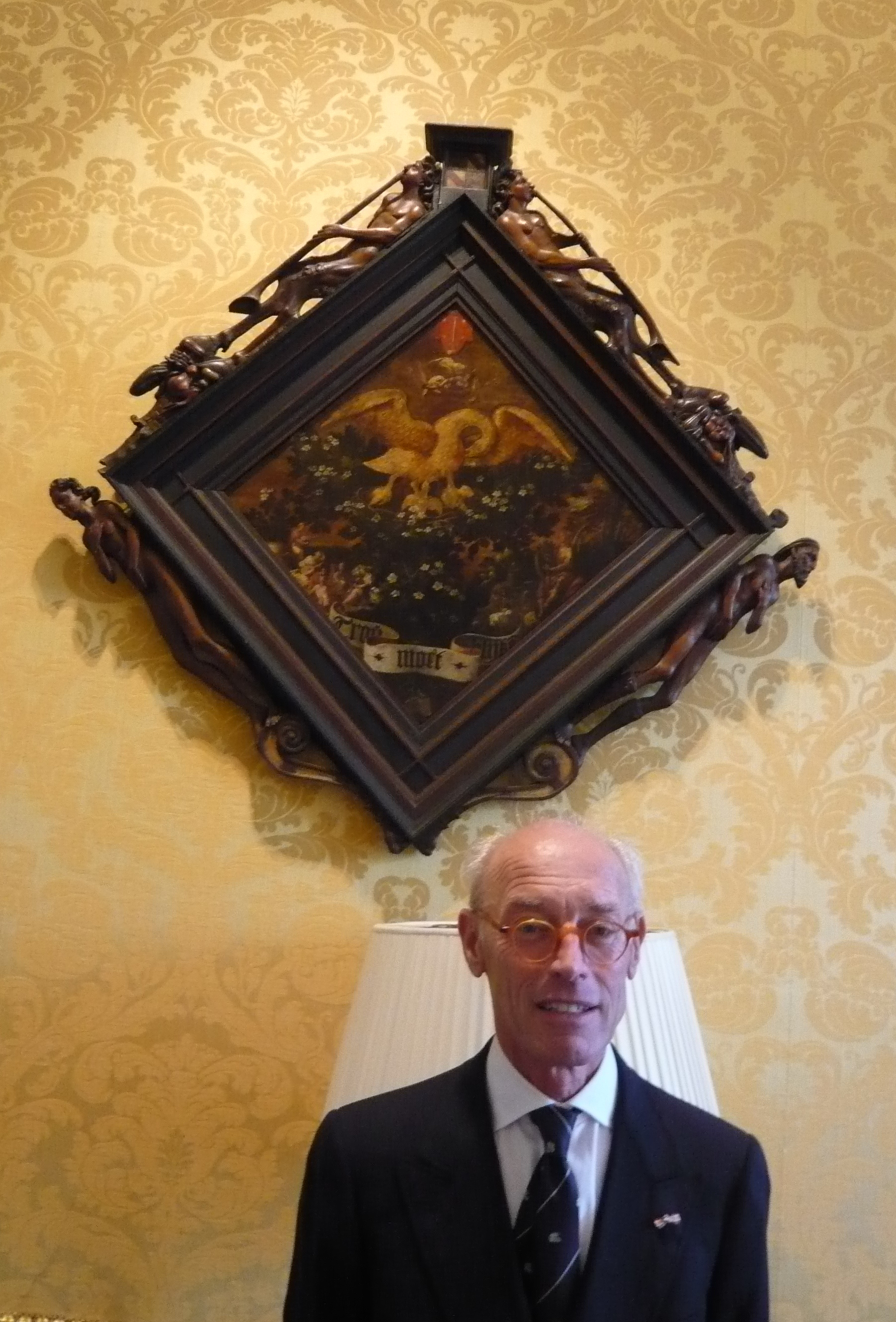
Pieter Biesboer beneath the emblem of the Haarlem chamber of rhetoric Trouw moet Blycken, painted by Nagel.

Jan Nagel (Dutch pronunciation: [jɑˈnaːɣəl]; c. 1560–1602), also recorded as Ian Nagel or Naghel in older sources, was a Dutch painter active in Haarlem and The Hague during the late sixteenth and early seventeenth centuries. He was described by Karel van Mander as a follower of the Antwerp painter Cornelis Molenaer and as a painter skilled in landscape and portraiture. In 1600, he was recorded as a member of the Guild of Saint Luke in The Hague.

== Life ==
Little is known about Nagel's early life. Karel van Mander's Schilder-boeck (1604) provides the earliest biographical account of Nagel.

Archival records of the Haarlem chamber of rhetoric Trouw moet Blycken identify Nagel as a camerist and record that he painted the chamber's heraldic emblem in 1593.

The RKD records that his daughter Neeltge married the painter Sijbert Cornelisz Moninckx, who was the father of painter Pieter Moninckx. The eighteenth-century biographer Arnold Houbraken mentioned Nagel as the teacher of the painter Claes Jacobsz van der Heck.

Nagel died in The Hague in 1602.

== Work ==
Nagel's surviving oeuvre is small, and relatively few paintings are securely attributed to him. His surviving and attributed works include religious subjects, while Van Mander also praised his abilities in portraiture and landscape painting.

A signed and dated painting by Nagel is The Miracle at the Grave of Elisha (1596), which depicts the biblical miracle described in the Second Book of Kings in which a dead man is revived after being placed in the tomb of the prophet Elisha.

Another surviving religious painting by Nagel is The Weeping Mary Magdalene at the Feet of the Crucified Christ, an oil on panel in the collection of Museum De Waag in Deventer, dated to the late sixteenth or early seventeenth century.

In addition to surviving paintings, Nagel supplied designs for engraved devotional prints. Around 1589, his compositions of Christ as Salvator Mundi, Mary as Mater Dolorosa, and Saint John were engraved in the workshop of Jacques de Gheyn.

Documentary evidence also indicates that works attributed to Nagel circulated in seventeenth-century Dutch collections. The Montias Database records several paintings attributed to Jan Nagel, including landscapes and religious subjects, although these entries are based on inventory descriptions and do not correspond to securely identified surviving works.

== Gallery ==
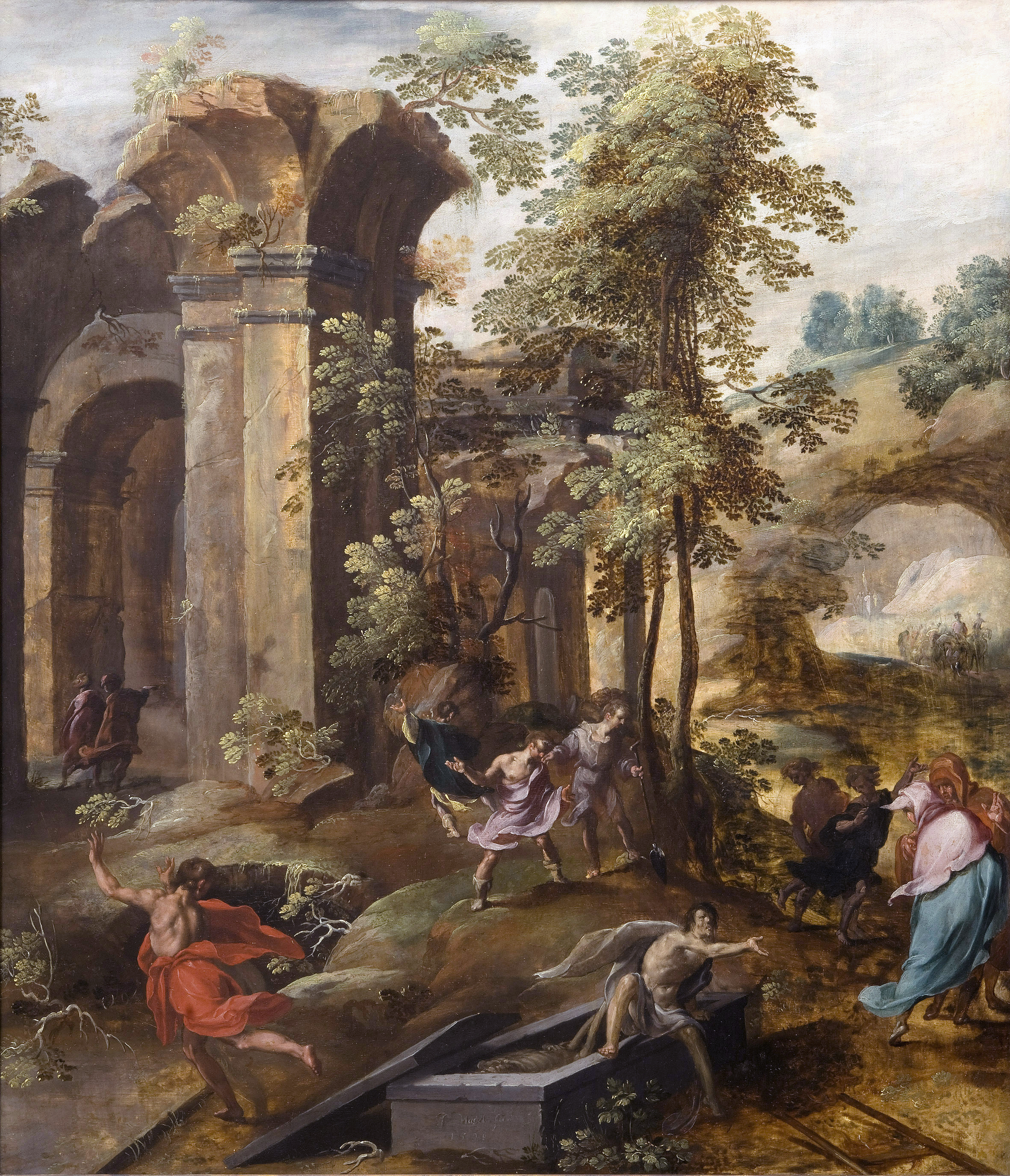
The Miracle at the Grave of Elisha (1596)

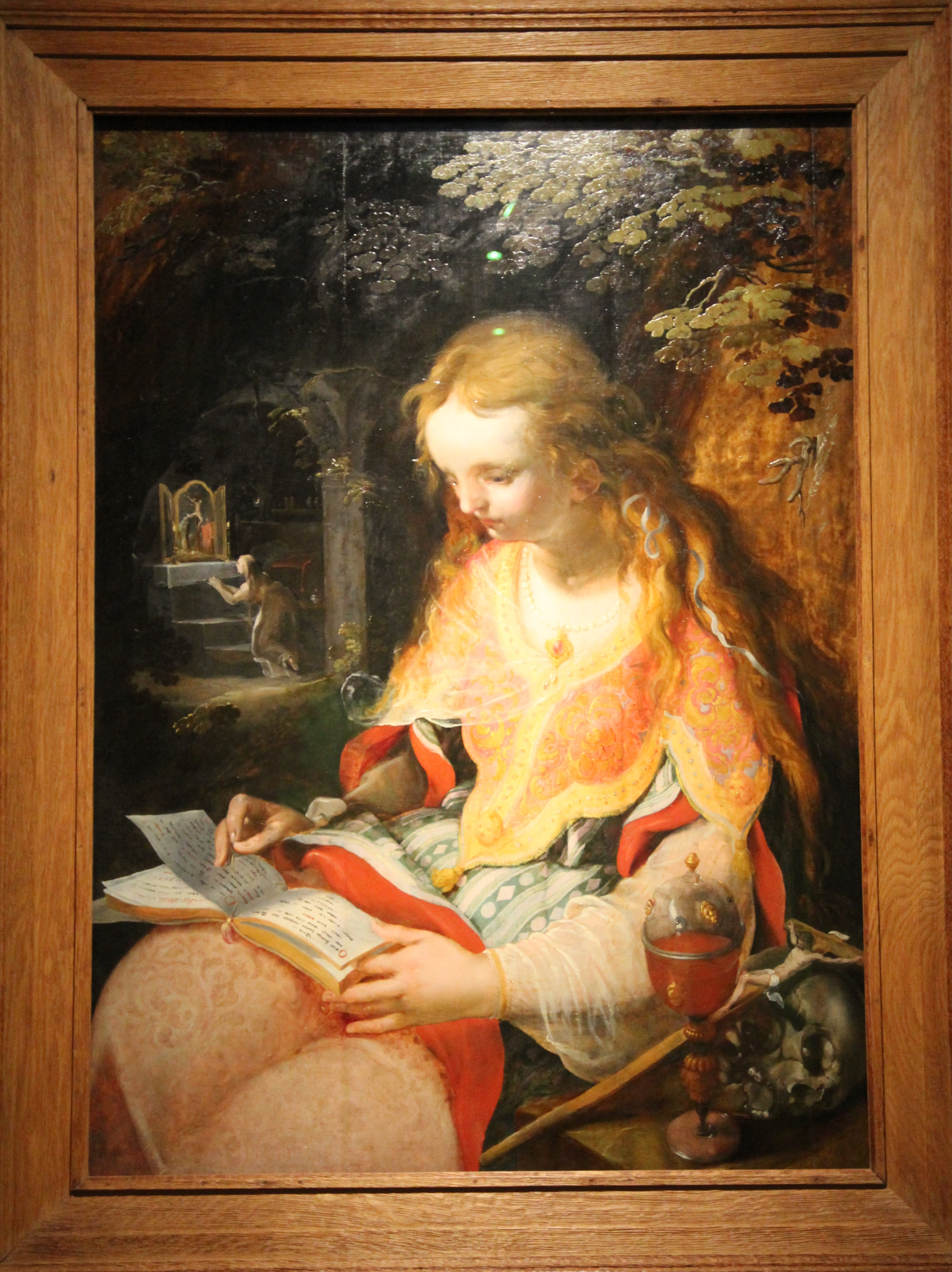
Mary Magdalene (1592)

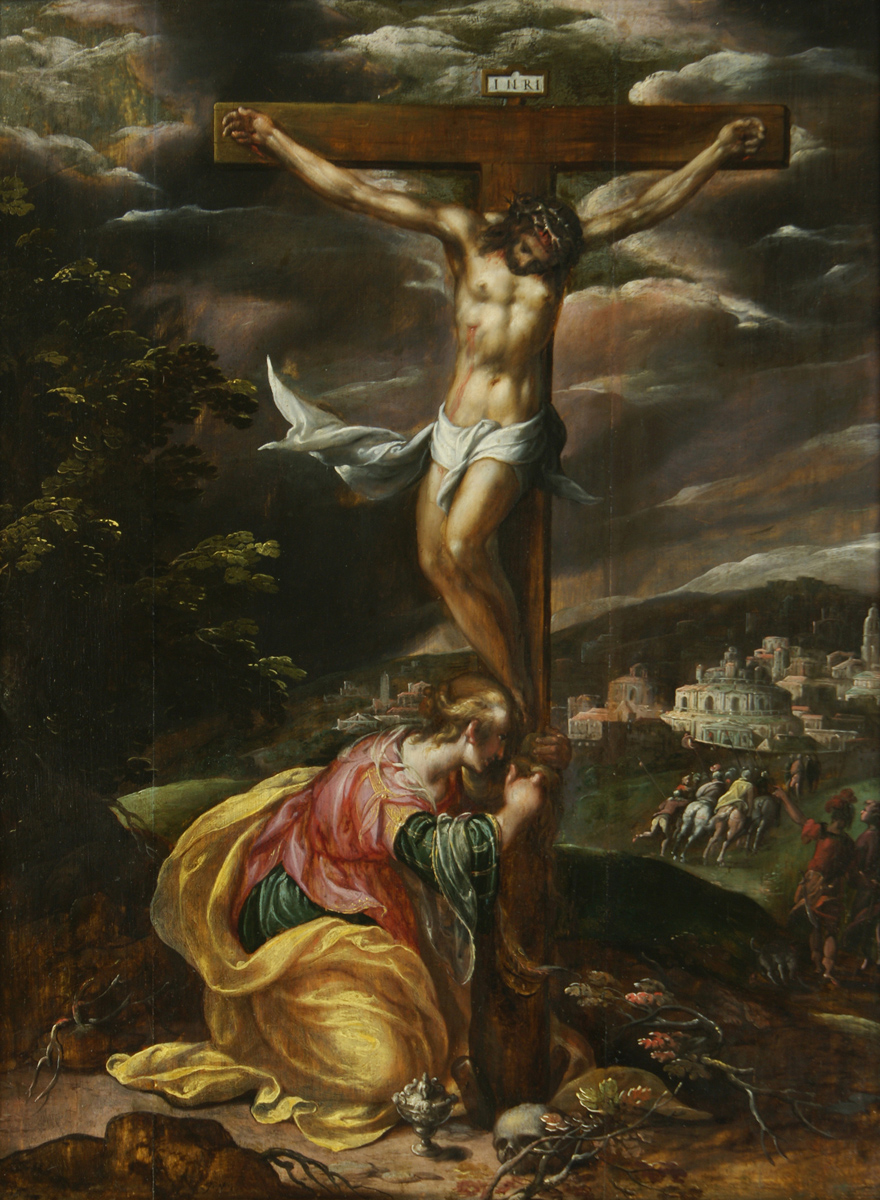
The Weeping Mary Magdalene at the Feet of the Crucified Christ

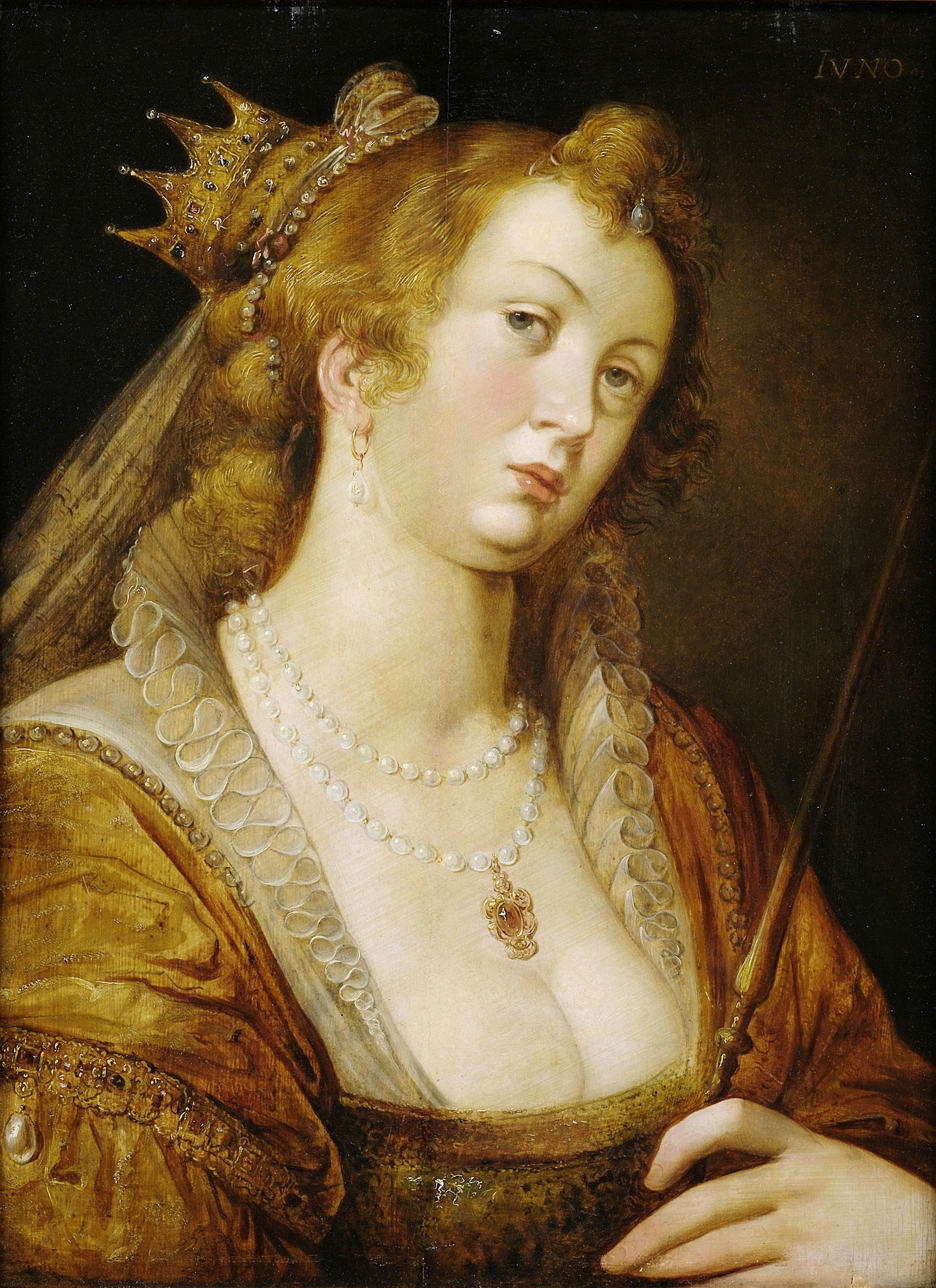
Juno (attributed)
