= Jan Martszen de Jonge =

Dutch Golden Age landscape painter

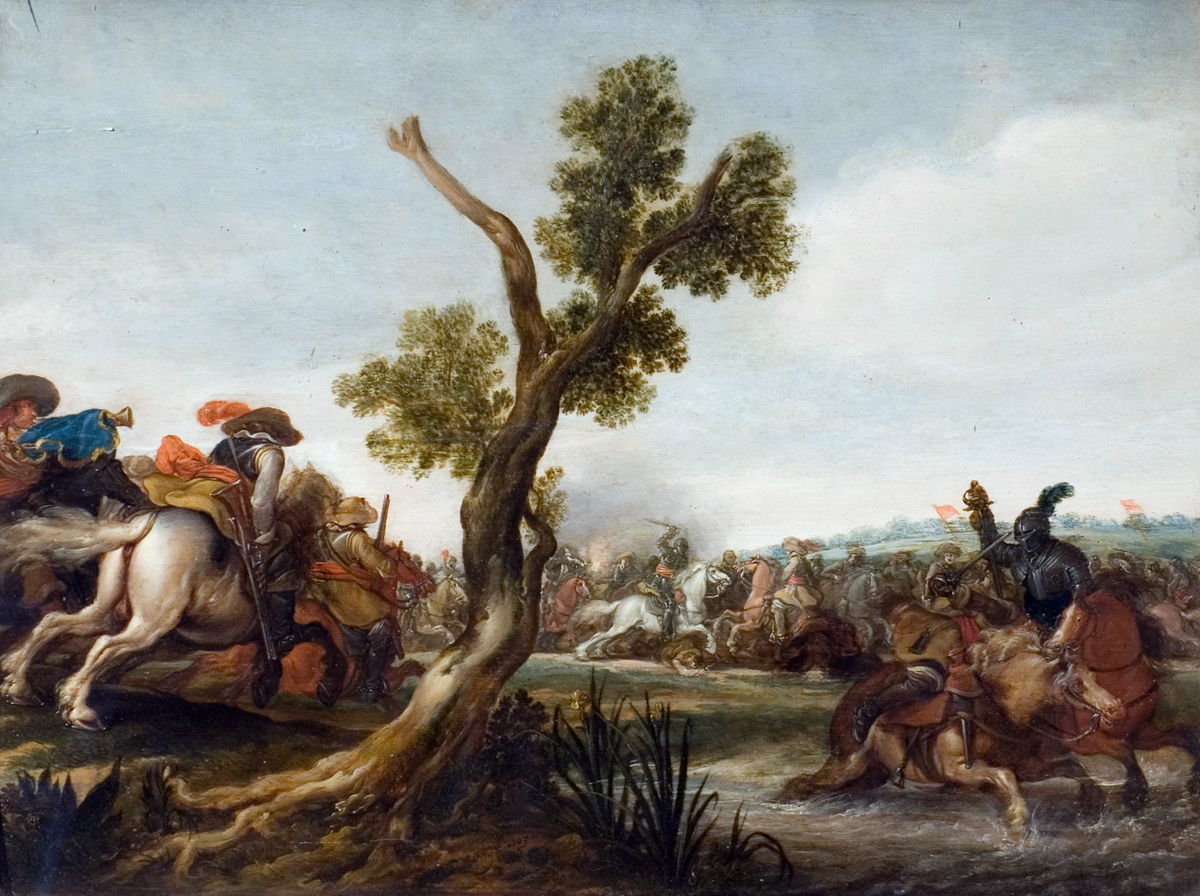
Battle scene, 1630–1636

Jan Martszen de Jonge (1609 in Haarlem – 1647 in Haarlem), was a Dutch Golden Age landscape painter.

== Biography ==
According to the RKD he was the son of the Haarlem painter Jacobus Martens (1579/80–1647), the nephew and pupil of Esaias van de Velde, and the teacher of Jan Asselijn. He lived in Haarlem, Amsterdam, and Delft, painting portraits and landscapes. He painted staffage in a few paintings for Bartholomeus van Bassen, along with Esaias van de Velde and Anthonie Palamedesz. In 1626, he moved to The Hague, probably with his father. He was only active for about a decade from 1630 until 1641, the period for which there are dated works. It is possible that some works from the 1620s are his, but signed with his father's name before he starting signing with "JM D. Jonge". This second type of signature led to suppose the existence of another painter M.de Jong. In 1629, he returned to Haarlem, where he worked until 1645. On November 26, 1633, he became engaged to Philipina Torel in Amsterdam. He is known for battle scenes with cavalry, and his works are sometimes confused with works by Palamedes or Abraham van der Hoef.
