= Esaias van de Velde =

Dutch landscape painter (1587–1630)

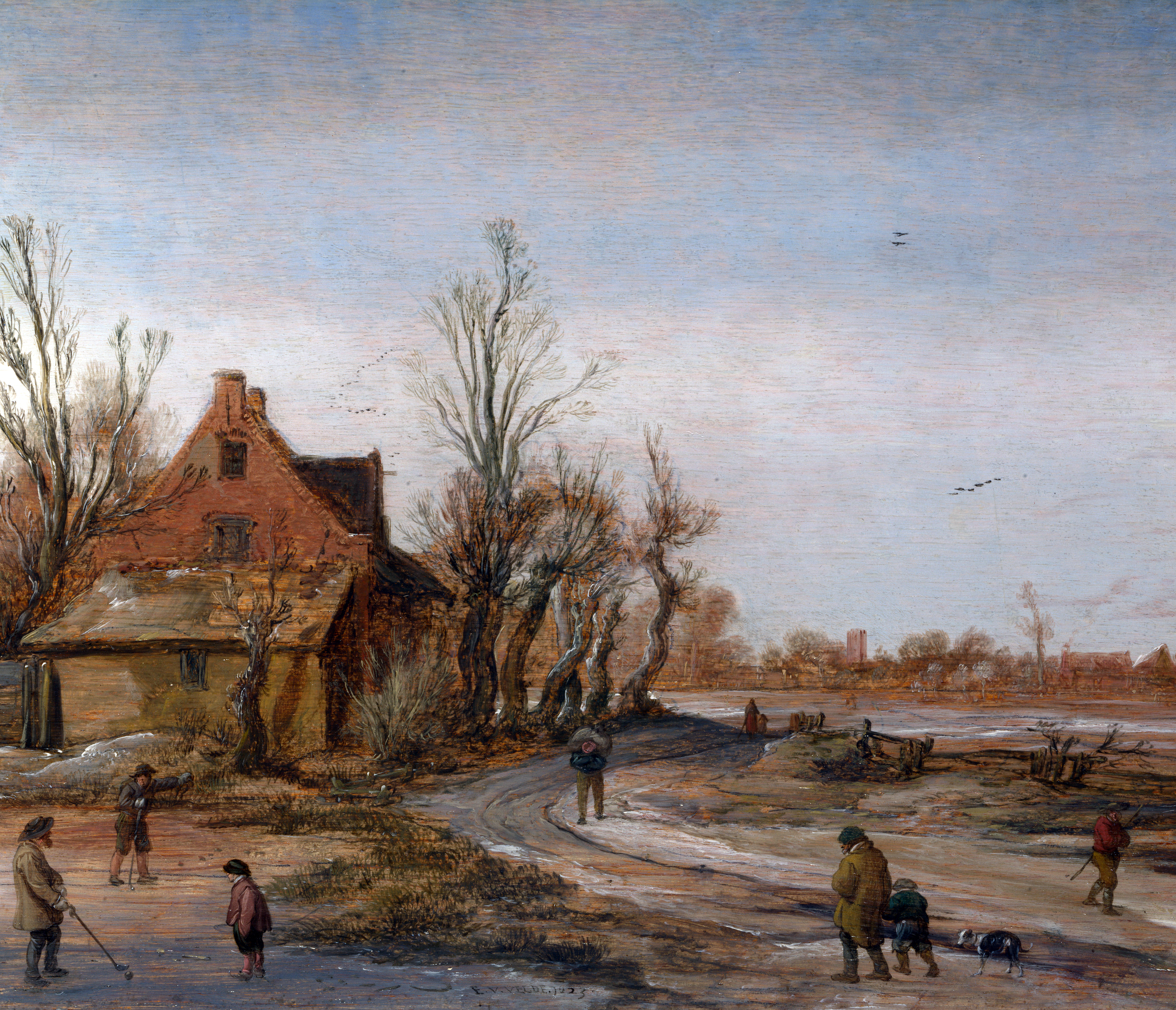
A Winter Landscape, oil on oak panel (1623)

Esaias van de Velde (17 May 1587 (baptized) – 18 November 1630 (buried)) was a Dutch Golden Age painter, mainly of landscapes and a printmaker who experimented with etching.

== Biography ==
He was born in Amsterdam, where his Flemish father Hans had fled as a Protestant in 1585. He probably studied under his father and Gillis van Coninxloo, a landscape painter from Antwerp and a follower of Pieter Brueghel the Elder. Van de Velde worked in Haarlem from 1610 to 1618, and joined the Haarlem Guild of St. Luke in 1612 along with Hercules Segers. This event in many ways established realistic landscape paintings as a separate genre in that part of the Netherlands. Van de Velde had been influenced by the German painter Adam Elsheimer to develop his paintings in a more naturalistic direction than his tutor and to adopt a low viewpoint and a triangular composition.

In addition to landscapes, van de Velde also painted genre and military paintings. He died in The Hague in 1630, where he had been Court Painter to the Prince Maurits and Frederick Henry. According to the RKD, he was influenced by Roelant Savery and Jan van de Velde. His pupils were Pieter van Laer, Jan Martszen de Jonge, Pieter de Molyn, Pieter de Neyn, Anthony van de Velde (II), and Jan van Goyen. He influenced Palamedes Palamedesz. (I), Nicolaes de Quade van Ravesteyn, Adriaen Adriaensz Ghibons, Jacob Wynants, Zacharias Blijhooft, Abraham Vinck, Willem Viruly, and Jan Asselyn.

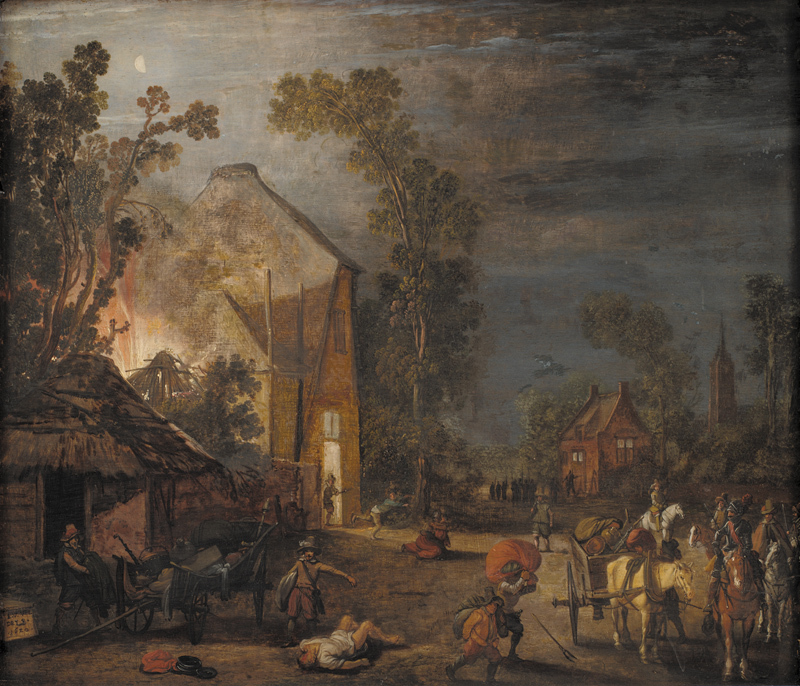
A Village Looted at Night, oil on panel (1620)

Esaias was not related to Willem van de Velde, but he was the cousin of Jan van de Velde. He died and was buried at The Hague.

== Works in museum collections ==
- Courtly Procession before Abstpoel Castle, 1619
