= Pieter Biesboer =

Dutch art historian and museum curator (1944–2025)

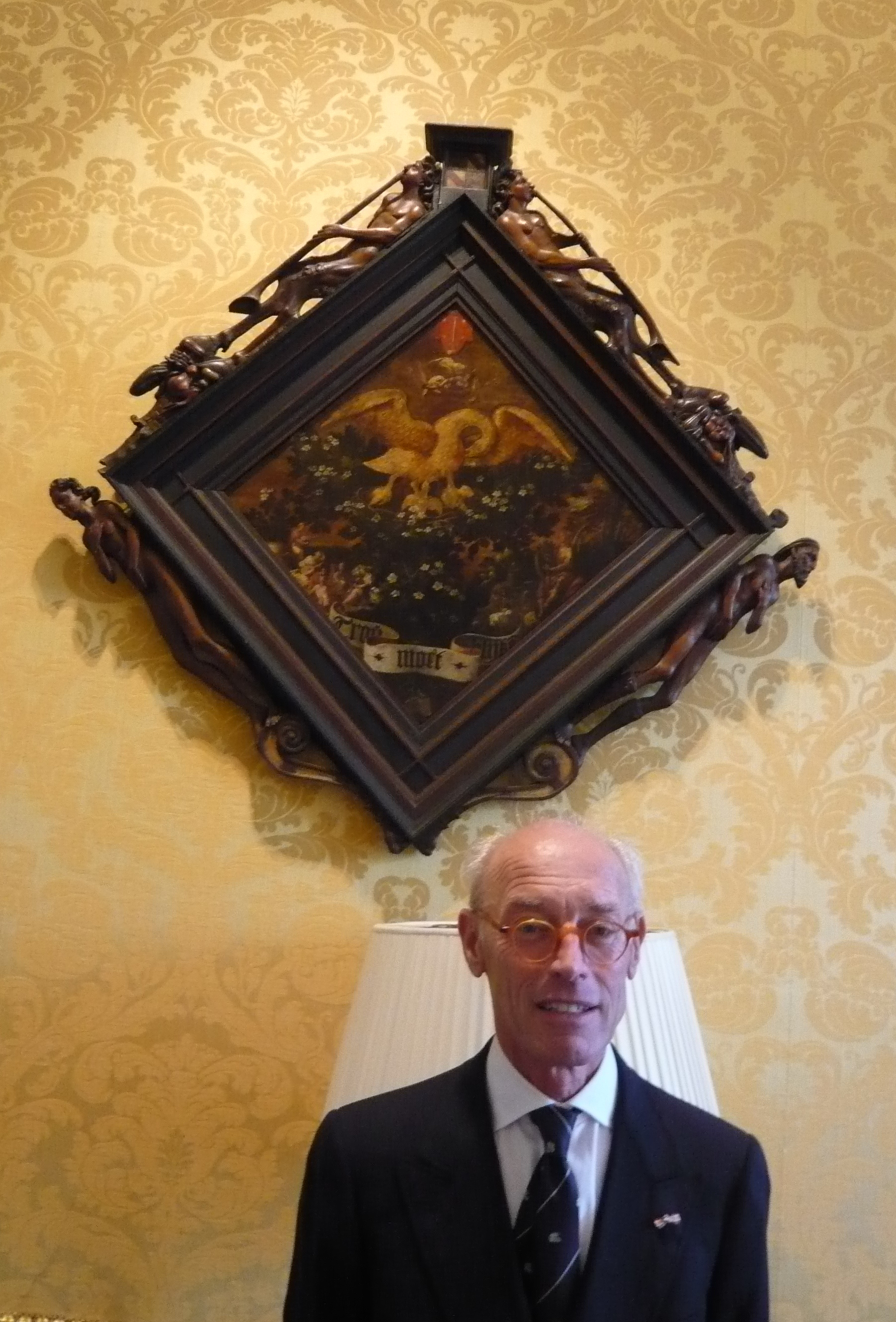
Pieter Biesboer and the Blazoen of Trou Moet Blycken painted by Jan Naghel

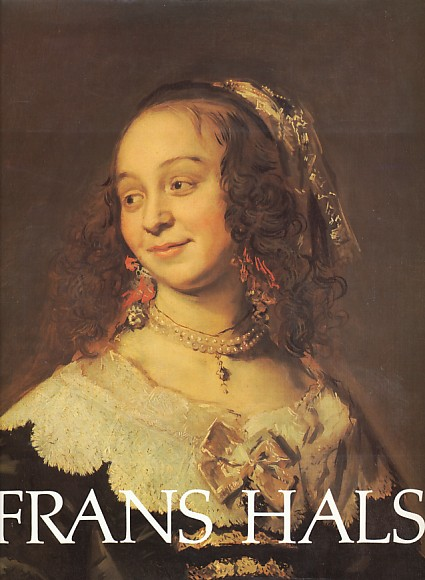
Cover of Seymour Slive & Pieter Biesboer catalog of Frans Hals paintings in 1989

Pieter Biesboer (1944–23 May 2025) was a Dutch art historian and prolific writer on seventeenth-century Dutch art. His specialty was art from Haarlem.

== Life and career ==
Biesboer was a curator at Stedelijk Museum het Prinsenhof in Delft from 1973 to 1976, where he worked on early modern Dutch painting and regional artistic networks. In 1976, he became curator of Old Masters at the Frans Hals Museum in Haarlem, a position he held until his retirement in 2009, after which he was succeeded by Anna Tummers.

From the outset of his tenure, Biesboer played a central role in reassessing and documenting Haarlem’s seventeenth-century school painting, contributing to exhibition-catalogues, provenance research, and museum studies that reshaped the standard accounts of Haarlem artists in the postwar period. He also contributed extensively to international reference projects: after retirement, he collaborated with the Getty Research Institute on the Thieme-Becker index and devoted himself to the Haarlem segment of the Getty Provenance Index.

Outside his museum-work, Biesboer remained active in the international art-historical community. In 2011 he delivered a public lecture at the Toledo Museum of Art on their acquisition of a Frans Hals painting previously documented in Haarlem; this lecture underscored his role as a bridge between archival scholarship and public museum contexts.

Biesboer’s death on 23 May 2025 prompted obituaries and institutional memorials across several major Dutch cultural outlets, marking the passing of one of the primary historians of Haarlem’s Golden Age painting tradition.

Biesboer is widely regarded in the field as one of the leading specialists on Haarlem painting, and his scholarly legacy remains central to contemporary debates over attribution, provenance, and the historiography of the Dutch Golden Age.

== Some publications ==
- Frans Hals, by Seymour Slive, Pieter Biesboer and others, 1989, ISBN 3791310321
- Judith Leyster: a Dutch master and her world, by James A. Welu, Pieter Biesboer, Haarlem, Frans Hals Museum, Waanders, 1993
- 'Topographical Identifications for a Number of "Haerlempjes" by Jacob van Ruisdael', in Shop Talk. Studies in Honor of Seymour Slive, Cambridge, Mass, 1995, 36-39
- De Vlamingen in Haarlem, Zwolle, Waanders, 1997
- Collections of paintings in Haarlem, 1572-1745, by P Biesboer; Carol Togneri, Los Angeles, Getty Provenance Index, Getty Research Institute, 2001
- Pieter Claesz: Master of Haarlem Still Life, by Pieter Biesboer and others, Zwolle, Waanders Publishers, 2004
- De Gouden Eeuw begint in Haarlem, by Pieter Biesboer, Haarlem, Frans Hals Museum & NAi, 2008
- Painting family : the De Brays : master painters of the 17th century Holland, by Pieter Biesboer, Zwolle, Waanders, 2008
- 'De Laughing Cavalier van Frans Hals. Een mogelijke identificatie', in: Face Book. Studies on Dutch and Flemish Portraiture of the 16th-18th Centuries, The Hague 2013, p. 133-140
- 'The Identification of a Family Portrait by Frans Hals Recently Acquired by The Toledo Museum of Art', The Burlington Magazine 155, nr. 1319 (2013): 72-76
- 'De Haarlemse zilversmid Gerrit Pietersz Pauw (1605/06-1648)', in: De Stavelij Jaarboek 2014/15, p. 46-55
- 'Barend Gast (ca. 1625-1679) meesterzilversmid in Delft en Leiden', in: De Stavelij Jaarboek 2016, p. 26-31.
- 'Philips Lu(y)da (1634/35-1673, meesterzilversmid in Delft', in: De Stavelij Jaarboek 2016, p. 32-39
- 'De Delftse zilversmid Nicolaes Adriaensz de Grebber (1544/45-1613)', in: De Stavelij Jaarboek 2018, p. 46-54
- 'De Delftse zilversmid Adriaen Claesz de Grebber (1576/77-1658). Naamsverwarringen, nieuwe documenten en verbanden', in: De Stavelij Jaarboek 2018, p. 55-71
- 'De identificatie van een familieportret door Frans Hals: nieuwe documenten', in Portretten van Frans Hals. Een familiereünie, cat. tent. Toledo, The Toledo Museum of Art; Brussel, KK Musea voor Schone Kunsten van België; Parijs, Fondation Custiodia, collectie Lugt, 2018-2019
- Delfts Zilver. Delftse goud- en zilversmeden en hun merken 1536-1807, Zwolle 2020
