= Cornelis Molenaer =

Flemish Renaissance painter (1540–1589)

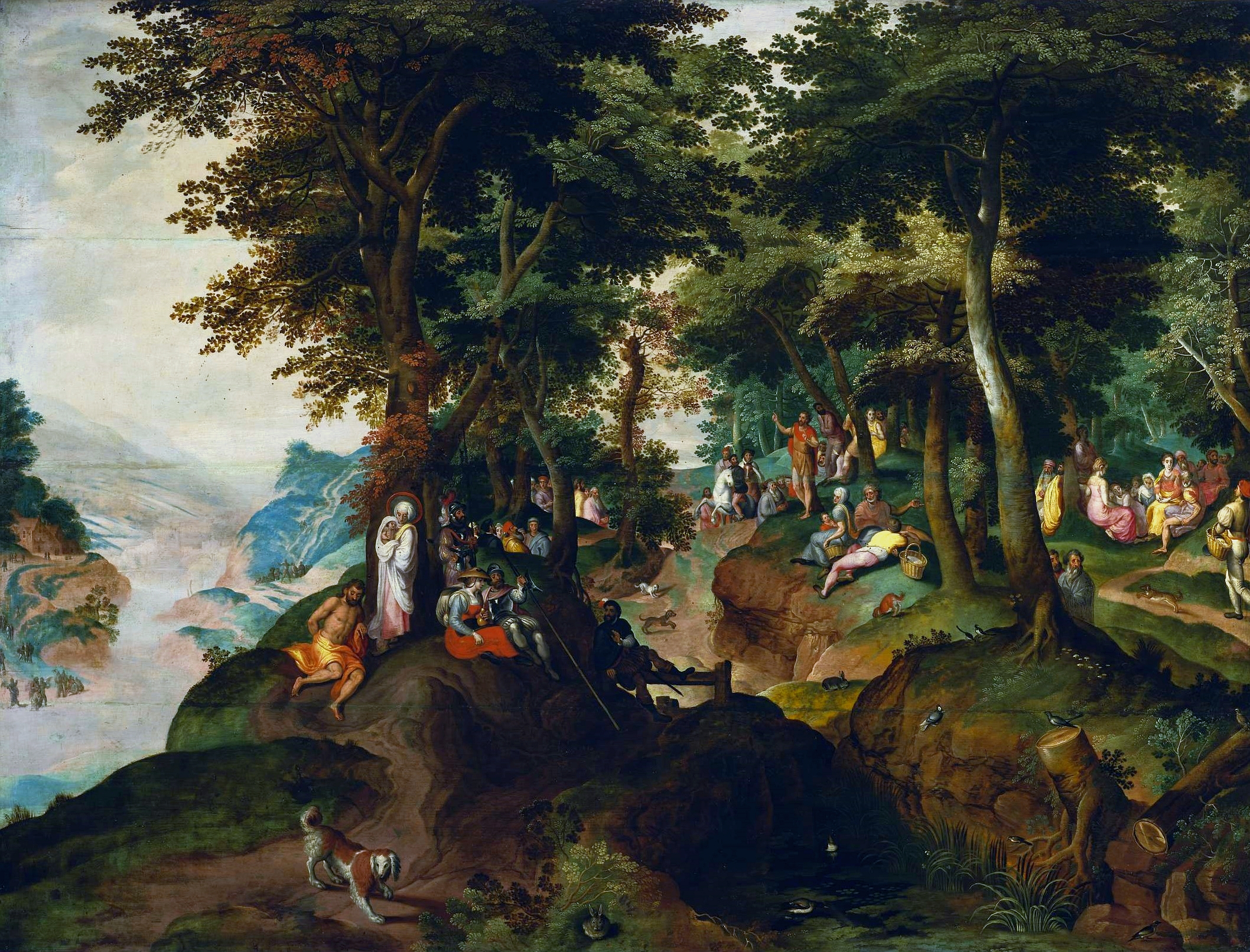
Landscape with St. John, collaboration with Gillis Mostaert

Cornelis Molenaer or Cornelis Molenaar (born c. 1540 – 1589) was a Flemish Renaissance painter known for his landscapes with biblical scenes.

== Biography ==
Molenaer was born and died in Antwerp. According to Karel van Mander he was called Schele Neel, or "cross-eyed Neel". He was a good landscape painter with little feeling for figures. He hired himself out for a day's wages (one daalder) and could paint a complete landscape in one day in the "watercolor way", without a maulstick. For a grassy field he charged 7 stuivers.

According to van Mander, Molenaer enjoyed drinking. Works in progress at home were seldom finished, which is perhaps why he became a wage-earner, so that patrons could keep an eye on his work. The painter Jan Nagel was his follower but this painter could not match his style of landscapes, but was better at figures.

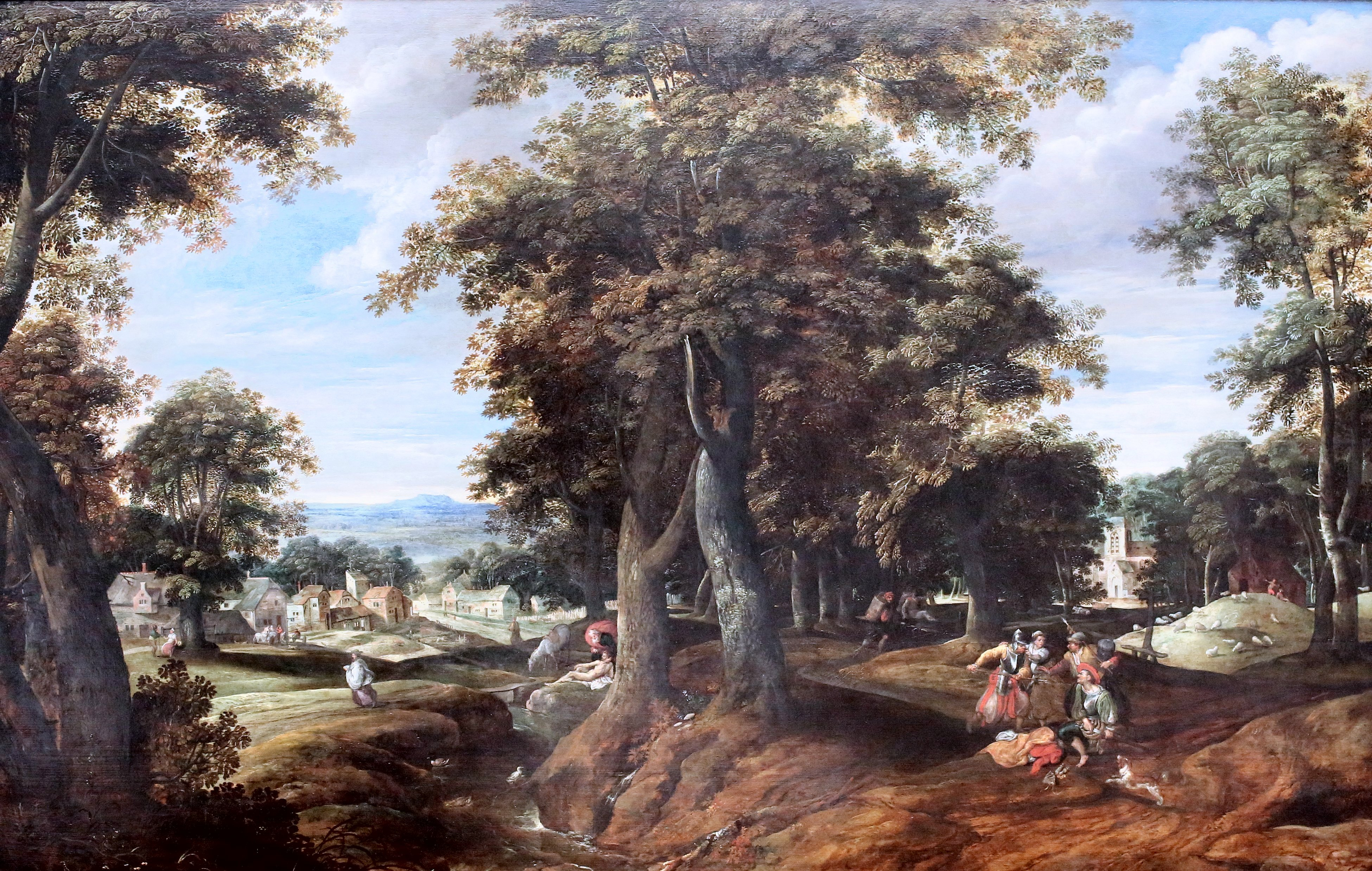
Wooded landscape with the good Samaritan

His son Jan de Meuleneer was a genre painter and his grandson Pieter Meulener was a prominent battle and landscape painter.

== Work ==
Only a few works of this artist are known, all representing landscapes with a scene from the bible. A composition called Wooded landscape with the good Samaritan, which is monogrammed C M is in the collection of the Gemäldegalerie, Berlin. It portrays a wide wooded landscape with a village in the distance and various scenes. In one scene an old man is helping a naked man lying on the ground. In another scene a couple is being attacked by soldiers who try to defend themselves, the woman more vigorously than the man. Some villagers nearby appear concerned in contrast to a Catholic priest who passes by unconcerned by the plight of the other people in the composition. This was clearly intended as a criticism of the Catholic church.

He collaborated with other local artists such as Gillis Coignet and Gillis Mostaert for whom he painted the landscapes.
