= A Village Looted at Night =

1620 painting by Esaias van de Velde

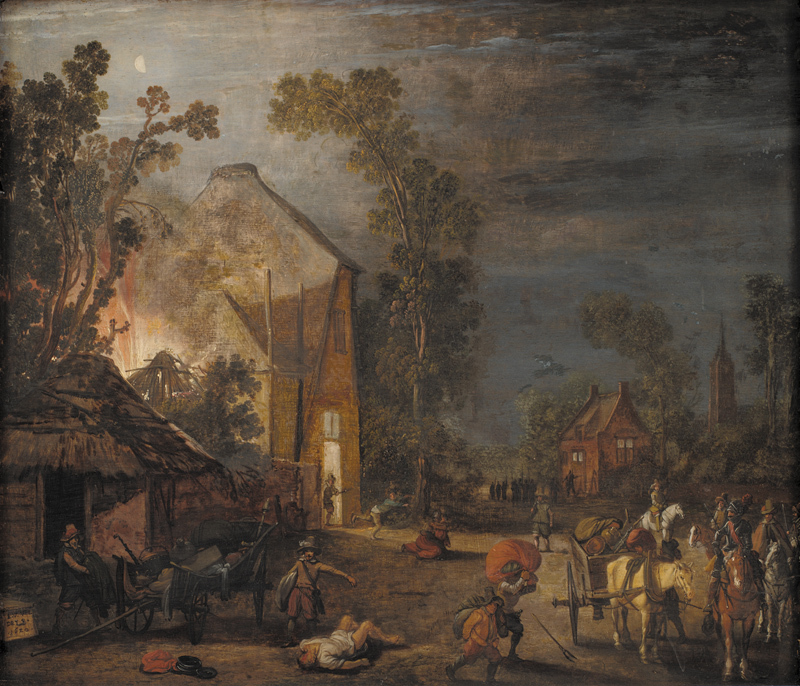
- Artist: Esaias van de Velde
- Year: 1620
- Medium: Oil on wood panel
- Dimensions: 35 cm × 39.5 cm (14 in × 15.6 in)
- Location: National Gallery of Denmark; Copenhagen

A Village Looted at Night is an early 17th-century painting by Dutch artist Esaias van de Velde. Done in oil on panel and depicting the looting of a village, the painting is currently in the collection of the National Gallery of Denmark.
