= Ernst van de Wetering =

Dutch art historian (1938–2021)

- Born: 9 March 1938; Hengelo, Netherlands
- Died: 11 August 2021 (aged 83); Amsterdam, Netherlands
- Known for: Scholarship on Rembrandt and the Rembrandt Research Project

Academic background
- Education: Royal Academy of Art, The Hague; University of Amsterdam
- Thesis: 'Studies in the workshop practice of the early Rembrandt' (1986)

Ernst van de Wetering (9 March 1938 – 11 August 2021) was a Dutch art historian and a leading expert on Rembrandt and his work.

== Early life and career ==
Van de Wetering was born in Hengelo. He trained as an artist at the Royal Academy of Art in The Hague and subsequently worked as a drawing teacher. In 1963, he began studying art history at the University of Amsterdam. He received his doctorate cum laude in 1986 with a dissertation entitled Studies in the workshop practice of the early Rembrandt.

From 1969 to 1987, Van de Wetering worked as an art historian at the Central Research Laboratory for Objects of Art and Science in Amsterdam, where his research encompassed historical painting techniques and questions concerning the conservation and restoration of works of art. In 1987, he was appointed professor of art history at the University of Amsterdam, a position he held until 1999. Alongside his academic work, Van de Wetering remained active as an artist, particularly as a painter and draughtsman.

He was Slade Professor of Fine Art at Oxford for 2002–03.

=== Barnett Newman Restoration Controversy ===
Van de Wetering was one of the critics of the restoration of the painting Who's Afraid of Red, Yellow and Blue III. This painting by Barnett Newman was attacked with a knife by Gerard Jan van Bladeren in 1986 and restored by Daniel Goldreyer in 1991. This led to a legal proceeding, which was concluded by a settlement. Van de Wetering was no longer allowed to publicly criticise the painting. However, he was still allowed to discuss the matter within the scientific community. In 2013, the Dutch newspaper de Volkskrant revealed, based on a report of the Judicial Laboratory of the Dutch Ministry of Justice, that Goldreyer's restoration has probably "forever destroyed" Newman's work.

== Rembrandt Research Project ==
In 1968, Van de Wetering joined the newly established Rembrandt Research Project (RRP), initially as an assistant. The project sought to establish and document Rembrandt's painted oeuvre through art-historical study, connoisseurship and technical examination. Van de Wetering became chairman of the project in 1993 and subsequently directed its research. His work increasingly combined technical examination of paintings with the study of seventeenth-century workshop practice and historical writings on art. This approach shaped his research into Rembrandt's painting technique, studio practice and methods of composition. The principal result of the RRP was the six-volume A Corpus of Rembrandt Paintings, published between 1982 and 2014. Van de Wetering contributed to the first three volumes and directed the later stages of the project, culminating in the final volume, Rembrandt's Paintings Revisited: A Complete Survey.

== Honours and recognition ==
Van de Wetering was appointed Slade Professor of Fine Art at the University of Oxford for 2002–03, where he delivered a series of lectures entitled Reconstructing Rembrandt.

In 2003, he received the College Art Association/Heritage Preservation Award for Distinction in Scholarship and Conservation. The award recognized his book Rembrandt: The Painter at Work and his writings on the philosophy and ethics of conservation and restoration. The same year, he was made a Knight of the Order of the Netherlands Lion for his work in the conservation and restoration of cultural heritage.

Van de Wetering received the Silver Museum Medal of the City of Amsterdam in 2011. In 2020, the Association of Dutch Art Historians made him an honorary member in recognition of his contributions to the field of art history.

In 2005, a Festschrift in his honour, The Learned Eye: Regarding Art, Theory, and the Artist's Reputation: Essays for Ernst van de Wetering, was published by Amsterdam University Press. Edited by Marieke van den Doel, Natasja van Eck, Gerbrand Korevaar, Anna Tummers and Thijs Weststeijn, the volume brought together essays by Van de Wetering's students, colleagues and friends reflecting areas of his research and teaching.

== Quote ==
In 2006, in celebration of Rembrandt's 400th birthday, van de Wetering was quoted by the Associated Press saying: "My hope for the Rembrandt year would be that somehow we would become free of images, that we look with fresh eyes. So much research has been done, and so little of this research has come to the knowledge of the general public."

== Selected publications ==
- "Studies in the Workshop Practice of the Early Rembrandt." PhD dissertation, Universiteit van Amsterdam, 1986.
- Rembrandt zelf, W. Books, 1999, ISBN 978-90-400-9314-2.
- Rembrandt: The Painter at Work. Amsterdam University Press, 2009. ISBN 978-90-8964-033-8.
- Ernst van de Wetering, P. van Schaik, B. de Lange. Rembrandt in nieuw licht. Local World, 2009. ISBN 978-90-811681-7-5.
- A Corpus of Rembrandt Paintings, RRP, Springer, 1982–2014: parts 1, 2, and 3 (edited, with J. Bruyn, B. Haak, S.H. Levie, P.J.J. van Thiel); parts 4, 5, and 6 (author).
- "Rembrandt's Beginnings—An Essay." Kassel and Amsterdam, 2001–2002, pages 22–57.
- Rembrandt, A Life in 180 Paintings. Local World, 2008. ISBN 978-90-811681-2-0
- Rembrandt. The Painter Thinking. Amsterdam University Press, 2016. ISBN 978-90-8964-561-6.
- Rembrandt's Paintings Revisited, A Complete Survey, Springer, 2017. ISBN 978-94-024-1027-3.
