= Zacharias Blyhooft =

Dutch painter

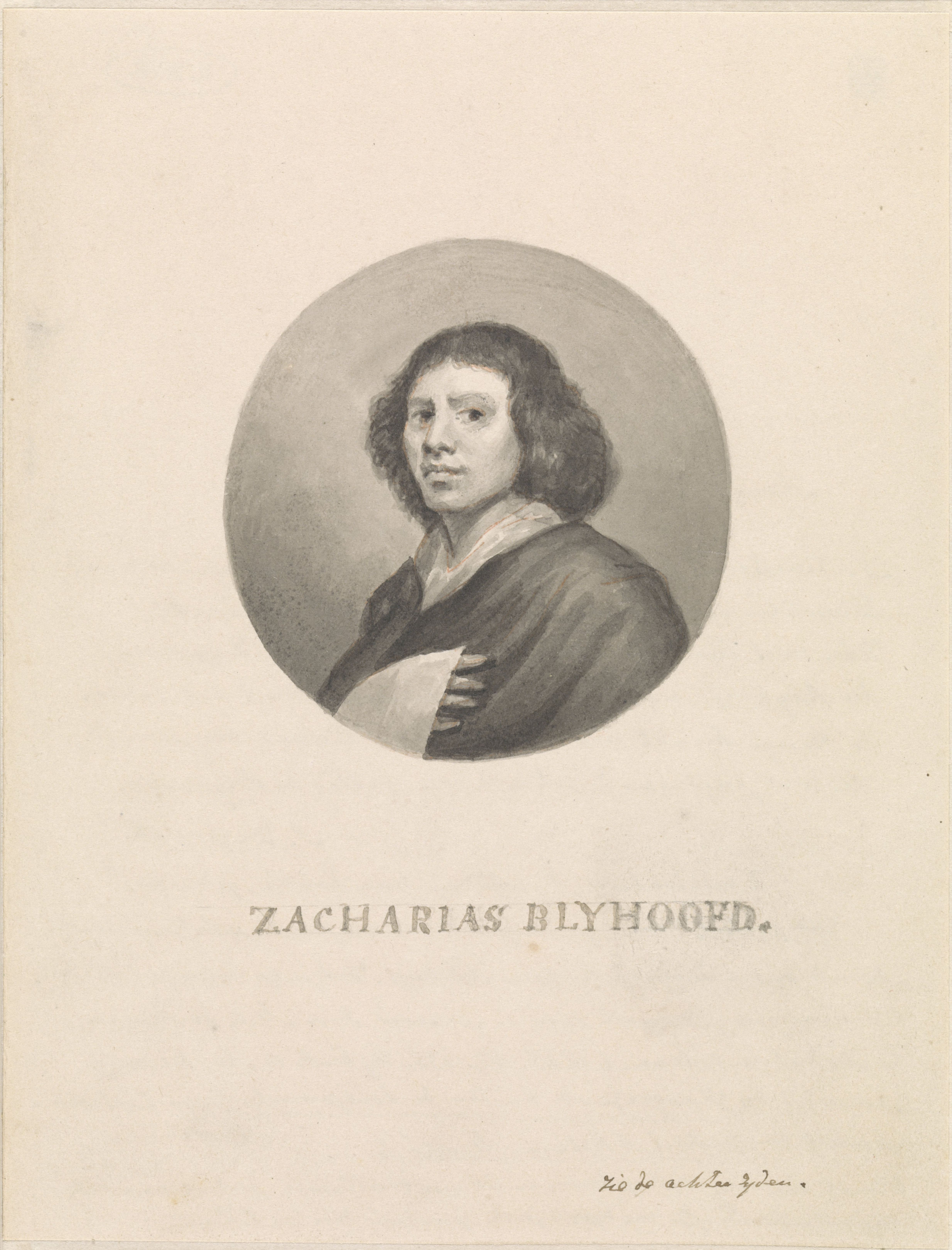
- Portrait of Zacharias Blyhoofd by Christiaan Kramm
- Born: 1630
- Died: 1681 (aged 50–51); Middelburg, Dutch Republic

Zacharias Blyhooft (or Zacharias Blijhooft; c. 1630 – 1681, Middelburg) was a Dutch painter, of whom but little is known; he lived in Middelburg from 1658/9 until his death in 1681, but probably learnt his trade elsewhere. Two pictures by him are noticed in the Catalogues of Hoet and Terwesten, and, in regard to their merit, compared to those of Netscher. For this reason he is noticed here, as many pictures are ascribed to Netscher that resemble his manner, but are not by him.
