= Koenraad Jonckheere =

Belgian art historian (born 1975)

- Born: May 5, 1975 (age 51); Izegem, Belgium
- Education: KU Leuven; University of Amsterdam
- Occupations: Art historian, academic, author
- Employer: Ghent University
- Known for: Research on Northern Renaissance and Baroque art, art markets, portraiture, and visual culture

Koenraad Jonckheere (born 5 May, 1975) is a Belgian art historian, academic, and author. He is professor of Northern Renaissance and Baroque art at Ghent University. His scholarship links the study of early modern art to contemporary visual culture, using modern technologies and present-day social concerns to reassess Old Master painting, attribution, portraiture, and spectatorship.

== Early life and education ==
Jonckheere was born in Izegem, Belgium, in 1975. He studied history and art history at KU Leuven and received his PhD from the University of Amsterdam in 2005.

=== Academic career ===
Jonckheere is a professor at Ghent University, where he teaches and researches Northern Renaissance and Baroque art. He has also been affiliated with the Netherlands Institute for Advanced Study.

=== Research and scholarship ===
Jonckheere's scholarship centers on early modern Netherlandish and European art, with a particular focus on the social and historical force of images. His research has addressed portraiture, image theory, art markets, and visual culture in the sixteenth and seventeenth centuries.

A recurring theme in his work is the capacity of images to shape belief, persuasion, and cultural habits. In his study Images of Stone, he examined the material and conceptual status of images during sixteenth-century image debates. His earlier scholarship also includes work on artists such as Peter Paul Rubens and Adriaen Thomasz. Key.

== Public scholarship and media ==
Alongside his academic writing, Jonckheere has published and appeared in formats aimed at a broader readership, including interviews, podcasts, and general-audience books on the history of art.

Several of these appearances present his work as drawing connections between historical image cultures and contemporary forms of media, especially social media and digital visuality.

== Instagrammable ==
Jonckheere's book Instagrammable has been discussed in the press as part of his broader engagement with visual culture and accessible art-historical interpretation.

The book connects art history with contemporary image culture, including social media, and addresses questions of visual persuasion, credibility, and artificial intelligence in relation to image-making and interpretation. Coverage in De Morgen and The Art Newspaper described the book as relating techniques and habits of seeing in historical art to the visual logic of Instagram and contemporary online culture.

== Books and selected publications ==
Jonckheere's work ranges from studies of the early modern art market and individual artists to synthetic accounts of European art history and books on contemporary visual culture.

- Adriaen Thomasz. Key (c. 1545–c. 1589): Portrait of a Calvinist Painter (2007), a study of Adriaen Thomasz. Key
- The Auction of King William's Paintings (1713): Elite International Art Trade at the End of the Dutch Golden Age (2008)
- Another History of Art: 2500 Years of European Art (2020; English translation announced in 2021)
- Instagrammable: What Art Tells Us About Social Media (2024)
