= Pieter Moninckx =

Dutch Golden Age painter

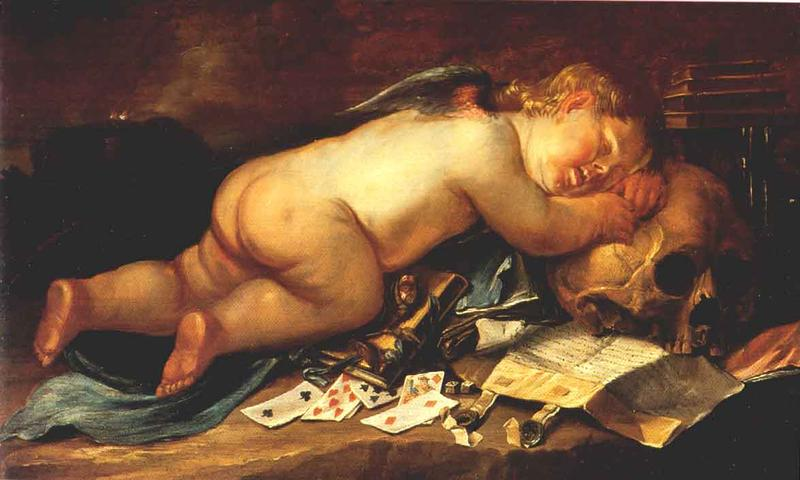
Amor and a skull

Pieter Moninckx (1606, The Hague – 1686, The Hague), was a Dutch Golden Age painter.

== Biography ==
According to Arnold Houbraken, he spent 13 years in Rome serving the Pope, and painted genre and conversation pieces in the manner of Gerarts (Houbraken means Gerard van Zyl, whose style is unfortunately unknown today). He died at the age of 80 in the Hague.

According to the RKD he was a member of a well-known and respected painting family, the son of Sybert, and after an extended stay in Rome, worked on decorations for the Huis ter Nieuwburg (since torn down) in 1637, and in 1639 he became a member of the Confrerie Pictura.
