= Pieter de Neyn =

Dutch Golden Age painter

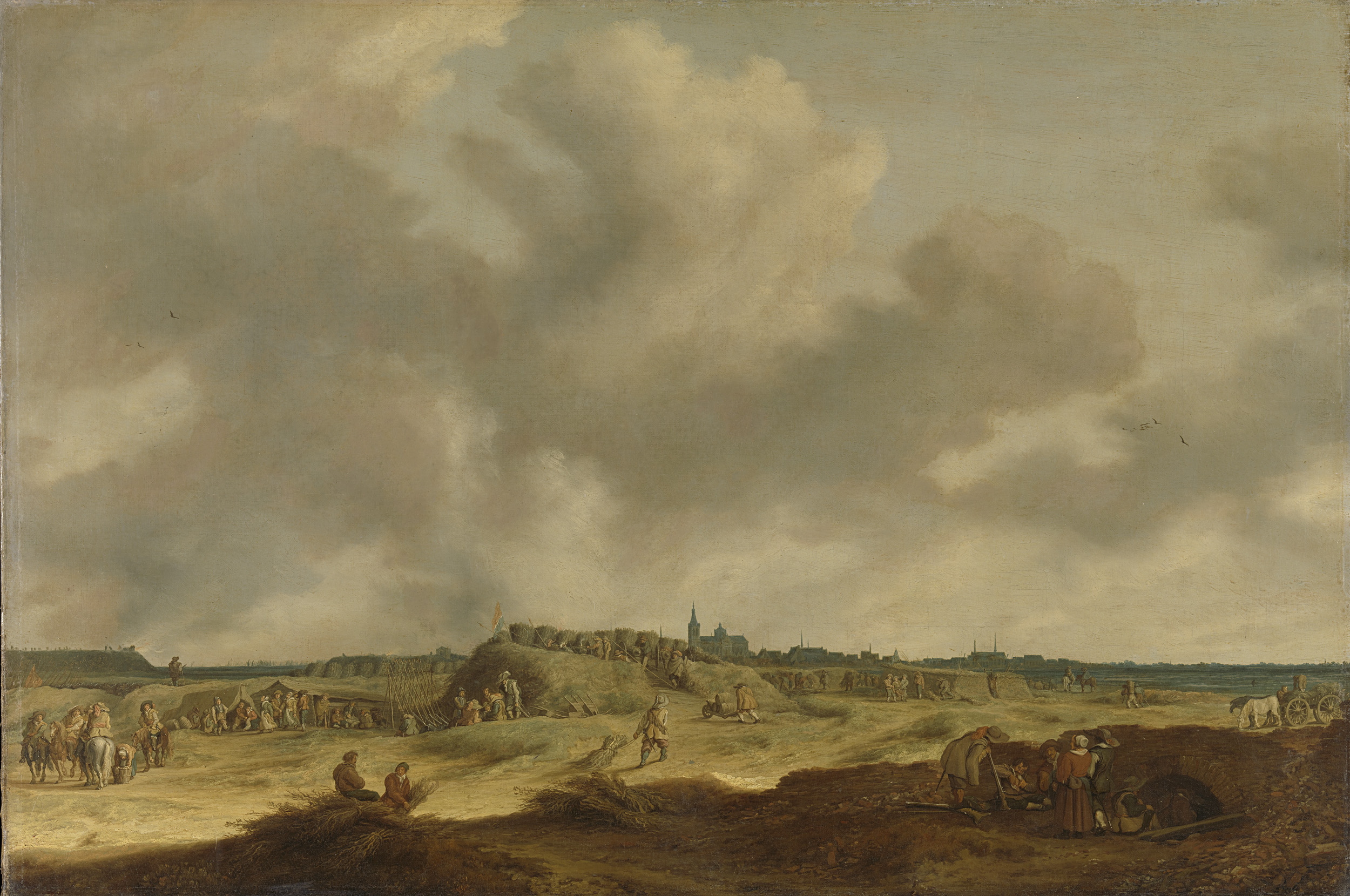
- Siege of 's-Hertogenbosch, 1629.
- Born: Pieter Pietersz; 16 December 1597; Leiden
- Died: 16 March 1639 (aged 41); Leiden
- Known for: Painting, Sculpture
- Movement: Baroque

Pieter de Neyn, or Deneyn (December 1597 – 16 March 1639) was a Dutch Golden Age painter.

== Biography ==
According to Houbraken Deneyn's father apprenticed him to a mason, where he stayed a few years but decided to study further, specifically the fields of mathematics and architecture. His parents could not pay for a proper education, and he became good enough at masonry that he began to teach others. He became friends with painters, particularly landscape painter Esaias van de Velde, who helped him with his paints and gave him tips how to become a good landscape painter. In 1632, he became city sculptor. He died of lung disease, which Houbraken claims was common among masons.

According to the Netherlands Institute for Art History (RKD), he painted landscapes and battle scenes, and was a pupil from 1611 to 1617 of Esaias van de Velde in Haarlem during the same period as Jan van Goyen, who also influenced his work. After 1617 he became moved back to Leiden where he married. He is sometimes confused with the engraver Pieter Nolpe, who also signed his works "P.N.". His followers were P.D. Bools, and the monogrammists A.V.Z. and L.B.
