= Abraham van der Hoef =

Dutch Golden Age painter

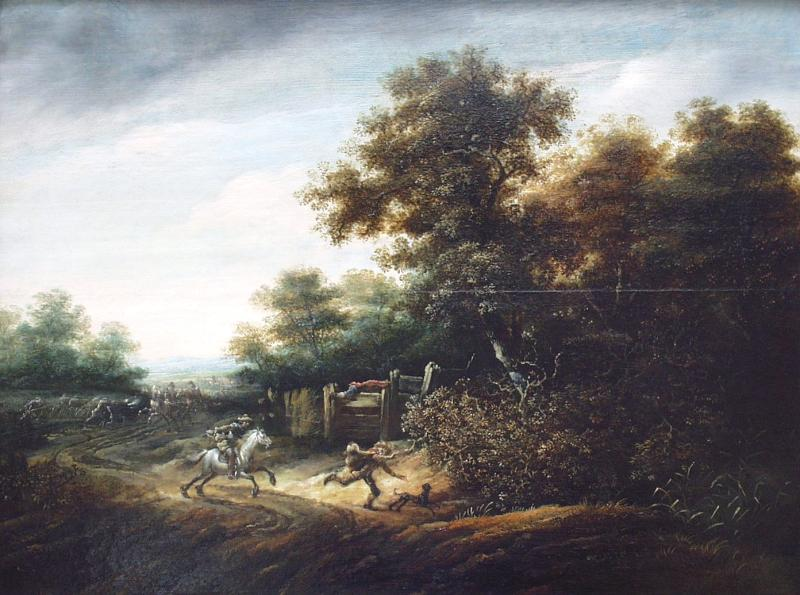
Landscape with scene of an armed holdup

Abraham van der Hoef (1611 – 1666), was a Dutch Golden Age painter.

== Biography ==
He was born in Haarlem and is known for landscapes with battle scenes. He worked in Delft and became a member of the guild there in 1651. He may have been related to the beer brewer Abraham van Hoeven of Delft, the son of Asper Fransz van der Hoeve or Houve, also known as Apert Fransen, who according to Karel van Mander had been a pupil of Frans Floris. He died in Haarlem.
