= List of minor planets: 560001–561000 =

The following is a partial list of minor planets, running from minor-planet number 560001 through 561000, inclusive. The primary data for this and other partial lists is based on JPL's "Small-Body Orbital Elements" and data available from the Minor Planet Center. Critical list information is also provided by the MPC, unless otherwise specified from Lowell Observatory. A detailed description of the table's columns and additional sources are given on the main page including a complete list of every page in this series, and a statistical break-up on the dynamical classification of minor planets.

Also see the summary list of all named bodies in numerical and alphabetical order, and the corresponding naming citations for the number range of this particular list. New namings may only be added to this list after official publication, as the preannouncement of names is condemned by the Working Group for Small Bodies Nomenclature of the International Astronomical Union.

Near-Earth obj.	MBA (inner)	MBA (outer)	Centaur
Mars-crosser	MBA (middle)	Jupiter trojan	Trans-Neptunian obj.
Unclassified

== 560001–560100 ==
Designation			Discovery			Properties		Ref
Permanent	Provisional	Named after	Date	Site	Discoverer(s)	Category	Diam.	Ref
560001	2015 FT_{7}	—	November 2, 2013	Mount Lemmon	Mount Lemmon Survey	EOS	1.8 km	MPC · JPL
560002	2015 FV_{8}	—	December 29, 2008	Mount Lemmon	Mount Lemmon Survey	EOS	2.0 km	MPC · JPL
560003	2015 FW_{8}	—	November 28, 2013	Kitt Peak	Spacewatch	·	2.3 km	MPC · JPL
560004	2015 FY_{8}	—	February 18, 2015	Haleakala	Pan-STARRS 1	·	2.7 km	MPC · JPL
560005	2015 FJ_{9}	—	February 17, 2015	Haleakala	Pan-STARRS 1	·	2.8 km	MPC · JPL
560006	2015 FG_{10}	—	February 17, 2015	Haleakala	Pan-STARRS 1	·	2.7 km	MPC · JPL
560007	2015 FB_{11}	—	August 13, 2006	Palomar	NEAT	·	3.1 km	MPC · JPL
560008	2015 FC_{12}	—	December 11, 2013	Mount Lemmon	Mount Lemmon Survey	VER	3.1 km	MPC · JPL
560009	2015 FH_{12}	—	February 18, 2015	Kitt Peak	Research and Education Collaborative Occultation Network	EOS	1.8 km	MPC · JPL
560010	2015 FE_{13}	—	March 16, 2015	Haleakala	Pan-STARRS 1	·	2.8 km	MPC · JPL
560011	2015 FJ_{13}	—	April 10, 2010	Kitt Peak	Spacewatch	EOS	2.0 km	MPC · JPL
560012	2015 FA_{14}	—	December 31, 2013	Kitt Peak	Spacewatch	·	2.5 km	MPC · JPL
560013	2015 FT_{15}	—	September 16, 2006	Siding Spring	SSS	·	2.9 km	MPC · JPL
560014	2015 FL_{16}	—	February 18, 2015	Haleakala	Pan-STARRS 1	T_{j} (2.99) · EUP	2.2 km	MPC · JPL
560015	2015 FT_{17}	—	March 30, 2004	Kitt Peak	Spacewatch	·	3.1 km	MPC · JPL
560016	2015 FC_{18}	—	January 30, 2009	Mount Lemmon	Mount Lemmon Survey	·	2.7 km	MPC · JPL
560017	2015 FF_{18}	—	March 16, 2015	Haleakala	Pan-STARRS 1	EOS	1.6 km	MPC · JPL
560018	2015 FA_{19}	—	March 16, 2015	Haleakala	Pan-STARRS 1	·	2.7 km	MPC · JPL
560019	2015 FO_{19}	—	November 19, 2007	Mount Lemmon	Mount Lemmon Survey	·	3.0 km	MPC · JPL
560020	2015 FV_{19}	—	October 18, 2011	Haleakala	Pan-STARRS 1	THB	2.6 km	MPC · JPL
560021	2015 FW_{19}	—	May 29, 2011	Mount Lemmon	Mount Lemmon Survey	EUN	1.1 km	MPC · JPL
560022	2015 FY_{19}	—	March 16, 2015	Haleakala	Pan-STARRS 1	·	3.5 km	MPC · JPL
560023	2015 FK_{21}	—	December 31, 2013	Mount Lemmon	Mount Lemmon Survey	EOS	1.8 km	MPC · JPL
560024	2015 FB_{22}	—	November 18, 2007	Mount Lemmon	Mount Lemmon Survey	EOS	1.6 km	MPC · JPL
560025	2015 FG_{22}	—	February 4, 2009	Mount Lemmon	Mount Lemmon Survey	·	2.0 km	MPC · JPL
560026	2015 FA_{23}	—	February 22, 2009	Kitt Peak	Spacewatch	·	2.4 km	MPC · JPL
560027	2015 FS_{23}	—	May 5, 2010	Mount Lemmon	Mount Lemmon Survey	EUP	3.4 km	MPC · JPL
560028	2015 FJ_{24}	—	February 16, 2010	Mount Lemmon	Mount Lemmon Survey	TIR	3.0 km	MPC · JPL
560029	2015 FO_{24}	—	October 25, 2013	Kitt Peak	Spacewatch	·	2.5 km	MPC · JPL
560030	2015 FV_{24}	—	October 23, 2013	Haleakala	Pan-STARRS 1	·	1.6 km	MPC · JPL
560031	2015 FK_{26}	—	January 17, 2015	Haleakala	Pan-STARRS 1	(1118)	3.4 km	MPC · JPL
560032	2015 FG_{27}	—	October 24, 2007	Mount Lemmon	Mount Lemmon Survey	·	4.1 km	MPC · JPL
560033	2015 FV_{27}	—	October 31, 2013	Catalina	CSS	TIR	3.1 km	MPC · JPL
560034	2015 FO_{28}	—	April 15, 2010	Kitt Peak	Spacewatch	·	3.7 km	MPC · JPL
560035	2015 FW_{29}	—	April 18, 2005	Kitt Peak	Spacewatch	·	3.5 km	MPC · JPL
560036	2015 FM_{31}	—	December 30, 2008	Mount Lemmon	Mount Lemmon Survey	·	3.2 km	MPC · JPL
560037	2015 FN_{31}	—	November 26, 2013	Haleakala	Pan-STARRS 1	·	2.1 km	MPC · JPL
560038	2015 FT_{32}	—	August 17, 2012	Siding Spring	SSS	·	3.2 km	MPC · JPL
560039	2015 FP_{36}	—	March 18, 2015	Haleakala	Pan-STARRS 1	plutino	163 km	MPC · JPL
560040	2015 FM_{38}	—	September 26, 2011	Haleakala	Pan-STARRS 1	THM	2.4 km	MPC · JPL
560041	2015 FL_{40}	—	October 23, 2006	Mount Lemmon	Mount Lemmon Survey	·	3.1 km	MPC · JPL
560042	2015 FN_{41}	—	March 17, 2015	Haleakala	Pan-STARRS 1	·	3.0 km	MPC · JPL
560043	2015 FQ_{42}	—	September 25, 2012	Mount Lemmon	Mount Lemmon Survey	PHO	620 m	MPC · JPL
560044	2015 FS_{42}	—	April 18, 2009	Kitt Peak	Spacewatch	·	2.7 km	MPC · JPL
560045	2015 FA_{43}	—	March 31, 2009	Catalina	CSS	·	3.3 km	MPC · JPL
560046	2015 FO_{43}	—	September 18, 2006	Kitt Peak	Spacewatch	VER	2.3 km	MPC · JPL
560047	2015 FE_{47}	—	September 14, 2013	Haleakala	Pan-STARRS 1	·	2.9 km	MPC · JPL
560048	2015 FM_{47}	—	October 23, 2009	Mount Lemmon	Mount Lemmon Survey	·	1.4 km	MPC · JPL
560049	2015 FU_{47}	—	September 24, 2007	Kitt Peak	Spacewatch	·	2.6 km	MPC · JPL
560050	2015 FV_{47}	—	January 18, 2015	Haleakala	Pan-STARRS 1	·	3.8 km	MPC · JPL
560051	2015 FA_{49}	—	October 10, 2007	Catalina	CSS	·	3.1 km	MPC · JPL
560052	2015 FB_{49}	—	October 8, 2007	Mount Lemmon	Mount Lemmon Survey	·	2.0 km	MPC · JPL
560053	2015 FC_{49}	—	October 28, 2013	Mount Lemmon	Mount Lemmon Survey	·	2.4 km	MPC · JPL
560054	2015 FX_{49}	—	January 22, 2015	Haleakala	Pan-STARRS 1	·	2.4 km	MPC · JPL
560055	2015 FF_{50}	—	January 16, 2015	Haleakala	Pan-STARRS 1	·	2.0 km	MPC · JPL
560056	2015 FO_{50}	—	August 20, 2000	Kitt Peak	Spacewatch	TIR	2.9 km	MPC · JPL
560057	2015 FZ_{50}	—	August 26, 2012	Haleakala	Pan-STARRS 1	·	2.1 km	MPC · JPL
560058	2015 FE_{51}	—	July 29, 2008	Kitt Peak	Spacewatch	·	1.4 km	MPC · JPL
560059	2015 FN_{51}	—	January 22, 2015	Haleakala	Pan-STARRS 1	·	1.1 km	MPC · JPL
560060	2015 FX_{51}	—	November 11, 2013	Kitt Peak	Spacewatch	·	2.0 km	MPC · JPL
560061	2015 FY_{51}	—	February 16, 2010	Kitt Peak	Spacewatch	·	2.4 km	MPC · JPL
560062	2015 FH_{52}	—	November 9, 2008	Mount Lemmon	Mount Lemmon Survey	LIX	2.5 km	MPC · JPL
560063	2015 FJ_{52}	—	October 9, 2008	Kitt Peak	Spacewatch	·	2.1 km	MPC · JPL
560064	2015 FR_{52}	—	April 30, 2011	Mount Lemmon	Mount Lemmon Survey	·	2.0 km	MPC · JPL
560065	2015 FS_{52}	—	September 14, 2013	Mount Lemmon	Mount Lemmon Survey	·	3.0 km	MPC · JPL
560066	2015 FY_{52}	—	October 3, 2013	Mount Lemmon	Mount Lemmon Survey	·	2.5 km	MPC · JPL
560067	2015 FK_{55}	—	September 26, 2013	Mount Lemmon	Mount Lemmon Survey	·	1.9 km	MPC · JPL
560068	2015 FO_{57}	—	March 18, 2015	Haleakala	Pan-STARRS 1	H	490 m	MPC · JPL
560069	2015 FR_{57}	—	November 28, 2013	Mount Lemmon	Mount Lemmon Survey	·	2.7 km	MPC · JPL
560070	2015 FE_{59}	—	February 22, 2015	Haleakala	Pan-STARRS 1	·	2.5 km	MPC · JPL
560071	2015 FE_{60}	—	November 28, 2013	Mount Lemmon	Mount Lemmon Survey	·	2.1 km	MPC · JPL
560072	2015 FM_{60}	—	December 30, 2008	Mount Lemmon	Mount Lemmon Survey	·	2.5 km	MPC · JPL
560073	2015 FT_{60}	—	January 20, 2015	Haleakala	Pan-STARRS 1	(18466)	1.6 km	MPC · JPL
560074	2015 FY_{60}	—	October 5, 2013	Haleakala	Pan-STARRS 1	·	2.3 km	MPC · JPL
560075	2015 FB_{61}	—	August 12, 2012	Kitt Peak	Spacewatch	EOS	1.9 km	MPC · JPL
560076	2015 FF_{62}	—	October 9, 2012	Haleakala	Pan-STARRS 1	·	2.3 km	MPC · JPL
560077	2015 FM_{63}	—	November 29, 2013	Mount Lemmon	Mount Lemmon Survey	·	2.3 km	MPC · JPL
560078	2015 FP_{64}	—	October 10, 1996	Kitt Peak	Spacewatch	EUP	2.6 km	MPC · JPL
560079	2015 FS_{64}	—	November 5, 2007	Mount Lemmon	Mount Lemmon Survey	·	4.3 km	MPC · JPL
560080	2015 FM_{65}	—	December 19, 2007	Kitt Peak	Spacewatch	·	3.7 km	MPC · JPL
560081	2015 FZ_{66}	—	January 28, 2015	Haleakala	Pan-STARRS 1	·	2.4 km	MPC · JPL
560082	2015 FD_{67}	—	November 27, 2013	Haleakala	Pan-STARRS 1	·	2.9 km	MPC · JPL
560083	2015 FS_{67}	—	July 21, 2006	Mount Lemmon	Mount Lemmon Survey	T_{j} (2.92)	3.3 km	MPC · JPL
560084	2015 FC_{68}	—	March 24, 2003	Apache Point	SDSS Collaboration	·	4.0 km	MPC · JPL
560085 Perperikon	2015 FV_{68}	Perperikon	February 16, 2015	Haleakala	Pan-STARRS 1	·	3.3 km	MPC · JPL
560086	2015 FN_{69}	—	March 18, 2015	Haleakala	Pan-STARRS 1	·	2.6 km	MPC · JPL
560087	2015 FZ_{69}	—	March 18, 2015	Haleakala	Pan-STARRS 1	·	2.8 km	MPC · JPL
560088	2015 FH_{71}	—	May 7, 2005	Mount Lemmon	Mount Lemmon Survey	EOS	1.5 km	MPC · JPL
560089	2015 FR_{71}	—	March 17, 2015	Haleakala	Pan-STARRS 1	·	2.7 km	MPC · JPL
560090	2015 FY_{71}	—	March 17, 2015	Haleakala	Pan-STARRS 1	·	2.5 km	MPC · JPL
560091	2015 FO_{72}	—	March 19, 2009	Mount Lemmon	Mount Lemmon Survey	·	2.5 km	MPC · JPL
560092	2015 FU_{72}	—	March 27, 2009	Mount Lemmon	Mount Lemmon Survey	T_{j} (2.94)	3.3 km	MPC · JPL
560093	2015 FU_{76}	—	August 4, 2005	Palomar	NEAT	HYG	3.3 km	MPC · JPL
560094	2015 FZ_{76}	—	November 1, 2010	Kitt Peak	Spacewatch	·	750 m	MPC · JPL
560095	2015 FD_{77}	—	September 2, 2011	Haleakala	Pan-STARRS 1	·	3.0 km	MPC · JPL
560096	2015 FG_{78}	—	March 18, 2015	Haleakala	Pan-STARRS 1	THM	2.1 km	MPC · JPL
560097	2015 FH_{80}	—	December 25, 2013	Mount Lemmon	Mount Lemmon Survey	EOS	1.9 km	MPC · JPL
560098	2015 FP_{80}	—	January 26, 2015	Haleakala	Pan-STARRS 1	·	2.5 km	MPC · JPL
560099	2015 FQ_{80}	—	December 3, 2013	Haleakala	Pan-STARRS 1	EOS	1.4 km	MPC · JPL
560100	2015 FZ_{81}	—	November 8, 2008	Mount Lemmon	Mount Lemmon Survey	·	1.5 km	MPC · JPL

== 560101–560200 ==
back to top

Designation			Discovery			Properties		Ref
Permanent	Provisional	Named after	Date	Site	Discoverer(s)	Category	Diam.	Ref
560101	2015 FL_{82}	—	January 24, 2015	Haleakala	Pan-STARRS 1	·	2.4 km	MPC · JPL
560102	2015 FO_{82}	—	November 27, 2013	Haleakala	Pan-STARRS 1	EOS	1.5 km	MPC · JPL
560103	2015 FR_{85}	—	January 18, 2009	Kitt Peak	Spacewatch	·	2.6 km	MPC · JPL
560104	2015 FC_{86}	—	October 8, 2007	Mount Lemmon	Mount Lemmon Survey	·	1.7 km	MPC · JPL
560105	2015 FK_{86}	—	August 13, 2012	Haleakala	Pan-STARRS 1	·	3.6 km	MPC · JPL
560106	2015 FQ_{86}	—	November 28, 2013	Mount Lemmon	Mount Lemmon Survey	·	2.3 km	MPC · JPL
560107	2015 FR_{86}	—	August 8, 2012	Haleakala	Pan-STARRS 1	·	2.6 km	MPC · JPL
560108	2015 FD_{87}	—	October 26, 2013	Mount Lemmon	Mount Lemmon Survey	·	2.5 km	MPC · JPL
560109	2015 FU_{87}	—	November 27, 2013	Haleakala	Pan-STARRS 1	·	1.8 km	MPC · JPL
560110	2015 FS_{88}	—	September 27, 1997	Kitt Peak	Spacewatch	·	2.4 km	MPC · JPL
560111	2015 FQ_{89}	—	February 24, 2015	Haleakala	Pan-STARRS 1	VER	2.0 km	MPC · JPL
560112	2015 FN_{90}	—	January 16, 2009	Mount Lemmon	Mount Lemmon Survey	(8737)	2.0 km	MPC · JPL
560113	2015 FR_{90}	—	October 8, 2007	Mount Lemmon	Mount Lemmon Survey	VER	2.7 km	MPC · JPL
560114	2015 FQ_{91}	—	November 6, 2013	Haleakala	Pan-STARRS 1	·	1.9 km	MPC · JPL
560115	2015 FR_{91}	—	September 15, 2013	Mount Lemmon	Mount Lemmon Survey	·	2.3 km	MPC · JPL
560116	2015 FT_{91}	—	February 20, 2015	Haleakala	Pan-STARRS 1	EOS	1.6 km	MPC · JPL
560117	2015 FX_{92}	—	August 26, 2012	Haleakala	Pan-STARRS 1	·	2.1 km	MPC · JPL
560118	2015 FB_{93}	—	January 20, 2009	Kitt Peak	Spacewatch	·	3.1 km	MPC · JPL
560119	2015 FL_{93}	—	October 20, 2007	Kitt Peak	Spacewatch	·	2.1 km	MPC · JPL
560120	2015 FN_{94}	—	January 20, 2015	Haleakala	Pan-STARRS 1	·	2.3 km	MPC · JPL
560121	2015 FG_{95}	—	June 17, 2010	Mount Lemmon	Mount Lemmon Survey	·	3.0 km	MPC · JPL
560122	2015 FH_{95}	—	March 20, 2015	Haleakala	Pan-STARRS 1	·	2.0 km	MPC · JPL
560123	2015 FC_{100}	—	October 11, 2012	Haleakala	Pan-STARRS 1	·	2.5 km	MPC · JPL
560124	2015 FT_{101}	—	January 20, 2015	Haleakala	Pan-STARRS 1	LIX	3.3 km	MPC · JPL
560125	2015 FC_{102}	—	October 23, 2012	Mount Lemmon	Mount Lemmon Survey	·	2.1 km	MPC · JPL
560126	2015 FN_{102}	—	January 20, 2015	Haleakala	Pan-STARRS 1	·	2.5 km	MPC · JPL
560127	2015 FY_{102}	—	August 2, 2011	Haleakala	Pan-STARRS 1	·	2.9 km	MPC · JPL
560128	2015 FS_{105}	—	April 13, 2004	Kitt Peak	Spacewatch	·	2.0 km	MPC · JPL
560129	2015 FZ_{105}	—	March 28, 2004	Kitt Peak	Spacewatch	·	2.5 km	MPC · JPL
560130	2015 FC_{106}	—	January 20, 2015	Haleakala	Pan-STARRS 1	·	2.6 km	MPC · JPL
560131	2015 FK_{106}	—	September 26, 2006	Kitt Peak	Spacewatch	·	2.9 km	MPC · JPL
560132	2015 FF_{108}	—	March 20, 2015	Haleakala	Pan-STARRS 1	·	1.8 km	MPC · JPL
560133	2015 FK_{108}	—	September 19, 2012	Mount Lemmon	Mount Lemmon Survey	·	2.9 km	MPC · JPL
560134	2015 FA_{109}	—	December 4, 2007	Mount Lemmon	Mount Lemmon Survey	EOS	1.7 km	MPC · JPL
560135	2015 FS_{112}	—	August 24, 2011	Haleakala	Pan-STARRS 1	HYG	2.4 km	MPC · JPL
560136	2015 FT_{112}	—	August 23, 2003	Cerro Tololo	Deep Ecliptic Survey	·	840 m	MPC · JPL
560137	2015 FH_{114}	—	August 31, 2005	Kitt Peak	Spacewatch	·	3.1 km	MPC · JPL
560138	2015 FS_{114}	—	March 20, 2015	Haleakala	Pan-STARRS 1	·	2.3 km	MPC · JPL
560139	2015 FD_{116}	—	September 24, 2012	Mount Lemmon	Mount Lemmon Survey	·	3.3 km	MPC · JPL
560140	2015 FG_{116}	—	January 23, 2015	Haleakala	Pan-STARRS 1	·	2.4 km	MPC · JPL
560141	2015 FQ_{116}	—	October 21, 2007	Kitt Peak	Spacewatch	·	2.7 km	MPC · JPL
560142	2015 FV_{119}	—	May 10, 2004	Catalina	CSS	·	2.6 km	MPC · JPL
560143	2015 FD_{121}	—	June 9, 2011	Mount Lemmon	Mount Lemmon Survey	EOS	2.4 km	MPC · JPL
560144	2015 FQ_{121}	—	September 14, 2006	Kitt Peak	Spacewatch	·	3.1 km	MPC · JPL
560145	2015 FR_{121}	—	April 10, 2010	Mount Lemmon	Mount Lemmon Survey	·	2.1 km	MPC · JPL
560146	2015 FC_{122}	—	February 16, 2015	Haleakala	Pan-STARRS 1	·	2.3 km	MPC · JPL
560147	2015 FC_{123}	—	September 19, 2001	Kitt Peak	Spacewatch	EOS	1.8 km	MPC · JPL
560148	2015 FE_{123}	—	January 21, 2015	Haleakala	Pan-STARRS 1	HYG	2.2 km	MPC · JPL
560149	2015 FT_{123}	—	October 19, 2006	Mount Lemmon	Mount Lemmon Survey	·	3.7 km	MPC · JPL
560150	2015 FU_{124}	—	March 19, 2015	Haleakala	Pan-STARRS 1	·	1.7 km	MPC · JPL
560151	2015 FH_{125}	—	October 3, 2013	Mount Lemmon	Mount Lemmon Survey	·	2.8 km	MPC · JPL
560152	2015 FO_{125}	—	January 28, 2015	Haleakala	Pan-STARRS 1	H	450 m	MPC · JPL
560153	2015 FH_{126}	—	May 31, 2011	Mount Lemmon	Mount Lemmon Survey	·	2.9 km	MPC · JPL
560154	2015 FP_{126}	—	November 2, 2013	Kitt Peak	Spacewatch	·	3.3 km	MPC · JPL
560155	2015 FQ_{126}	—	November 8, 2008	Kitt Peak	Spacewatch	EOS	1.4 km	MPC · JPL
560156	2015 FY_{126}	—	October 23, 2008	Mount Lemmon	Mount Lemmon Survey	·	1.7 km	MPC · JPL
560157	2015 FB_{127}	—	November 19, 2008	Kitt Peak	Spacewatch	·	2.9 km	MPC · JPL
560158	2015 FC_{127}	—	November 1, 2013	Kitt Peak	Spacewatch	·	2.6 km	MPC · JPL
560159	2015 FD_{127}	—	October 3, 2013	Kitt Peak	Spacewatch	·	2.2 km	MPC · JPL
560160	2015 FL_{127}	—	October 12, 2013	Kitt Peak	Spacewatch	·	1.9 km	MPC · JPL
560161	2015 FQ_{127}	—	October 25, 2013	Kitt Peak	Spacewatch	·	2.0 km	MPC · JPL
560162	2015 FL_{128}	—	December 30, 2014	Haleakala	Pan-STARRS 1	·	3.0 km	MPC · JPL
560163	2015 FO_{128}	—	August 25, 2003	Palomar	NEAT	·	2.4 km	MPC · JPL
560164	2015 FV_{129}	—	December 27, 2014	Haleakala	Pan-STARRS 1	TIR	2.6 km	MPC · JPL
560165	2015 FO_{130}	—	November 1, 2013	Catalina	CSS	·	3.6 km	MPC · JPL
560166	2015 FS_{130}	—	December 1, 1996	Kitt Peak	Spacewatch	·	3.6 km	MPC · JPL
560167	2015 FY_{130}	—	January 15, 2015	Haleakala	Pan-STARRS 1	·	1.8 km	MPC · JPL
560168	2015 FG_{132}	—	September 27, 2013	Haleakala	Pan-STARRS 1	·	3.2 km	MPC · JPL
560169	2015 FK_{132}	—	January 29, 2015	Haleakala	Pan-STARRS 1	·	2.7 km	MPC · JPL
560170	2015 FD_{133}	—	October 5, 2013	Kitt Peak	Spacewatch	·	3.0 km	MPC · JPL
560171	2015 FH_{133}	—	October 30, 2005	Kitt Peak	Spacewatch	(1547)	1.0 km	MPC · JPL
560172	2015 FK_{134}	—	January 23, 2015	Haleakala	Pan-STARRS 1	EOS	1.8 km	MPC · JPL
560173	2015 FL_{134}	—	October 10, 2007	Kitt Peak	Spacewatch	·	2.6 km	MPC · JPL
560174	2015 FO_{134}	—	February 16, 2015	Haleakala	Pan-STARRS 1	·	1.3 km	MPC · JPL
560175	2015 FV_{134}	—	August 29, 2006	Catalina	CSS	·	2.3 km	MPC · JPL
560176	2015 FW_{134}	—	March 19, 2010	Kitt Peak	Spacewatch	EOS	1.7 km	MPC · JPL
560177	2015 FB_{135}	—	January 20, 2015	Haleakala	Pan-STARRS 1	·	2.5 km	MPC · JPL
560178	2015 FJ_{135}	—	April 4, 2010	Kitt Peak	Spacewatch	·	2.1 km	MPC · JPL
560179	2015 FM_{135}	—	October 8, 2007	Mount Lemmon	Mount Lemmon Survey	·	2.5 km	MPC · JPL
560180	2015 FZ_{136}	—	September 24, 2006	Kitt Peak	Spacewatch	EOS	1.7 km	MPC · JPL
560181	2015 FT_{137}	—	October 8, 2007	Mount Lemmon	Mount Lemmon Survey	·	1.9 km	MPC · JPL
560182	2015 FA_{139}	—	March 21, 2015	Haleakala	Pan-STARRS 1	·	1.4 km	MPC · JPL
560183	2015 FS_{139}	—	October 15, 2012	Haleakala	Pan-STARRS 1	·	2.5 km	MPC · JPL
560184	2015 FW_{140}	—	March 3, 2009	Mount Lemmon	Mount Lemmon Survey	·	2.9 km	MPC · JPL
560185	2015 FE_{142}	—	February 14, 2004	Palomar	NEAT	·	2.1 km	MPC · JPL
560186	2015 FN_{143}	—	September 27, 2002	Palomar	NEAT	T_{j} (2.95)	2.2 km	MPC · JPL
560187	2015 FD_{145}	—	September 28, 2009	Kitt Peak	Spacewatch	L4	7.1 km	MPC · JPL
560188	2015 FJ_{145}	—	February 26, 2009	Kitt Peak	Spacewatch	·	2.4 km	MPC · JPL
560189	2015 FZ_{146}	—	September 17, 2006	Kitt Peak	Spacewatch	·	2.6 km	MPC · JPL
560190	2015 FH_{147}	—	February 17, 2004	Kitt Peak	Spacewatch	EOS	1.6 km	MPC · JPL
560191	2015 FW_{148}	—	March 21, 2015	Haleakala	Pan-STARRS 1	·	2.5 km	MPC · JPL
560192	2015 FC_{149}	—	March 21, 2015	Haleakala	Pan-STARRS 1	·	2.8 km	MPC · JPL
560193	2015 FJ_{149}	—	November 11, 2001	Apache Point	SDSS Collaboration	·	2.4 km	MPC · JPL
560194	2015 FP_{149}	—	August 28, 2012	Mount Lemmon	Mount Lemmon Survey	·	3.5 km	MPC · JPL
560195	2015 FF_{151}	—	September 2, 2005	Palomar	NEAT	·	4.6 km	MPC · JPL
560196	2015 FC_{157}	—	February 22, 2003	Palomar	NEAT	VER	3.2 km	MPC · JPL
560197	2015 FQ_{158}	—	January 4, 2014	Mount Lemmon	Mount Lemmon Survey	EOS	1.8 km	MPC · JPL
560198	2015 FF_{163}	—	January 23, 2015	Haleakala	Pan-STARRS 1	·	2.9 km	MPC · JPL
560199	2015 FL_{165}	—	July 21, 2006	Mount Lemmon	Mount Lemmon Survey	·	3.0 km	MPC · JPL
560200	2015 FT_{165}	—	March 8, 2003	Kitt Peak	Spacewatch	·	3.0 km	MPC · JPL

== 560201–560300 ==
back to top

Designation			Discovery			Properties		Ref
Permanent	Provisional	Named after	Date	Site	Discoverer(s)	Category	Diam.	Ref
560201	2015 FG_{167}	—	March 21, 2015	Haleakala	Pan-STARRS 1	·	2.6 km	MPC · JPL
560202	2015 FT_{167}	—	October 18, 2012	Haleakala	Pan-STARRS 1	EOS	1.6 km	MPC · JPL
560203	2015 FG_{168}	—	June 29, 2005	Kitt Peak	Spacewatch	·	2.9 km	MPC · JPL
560204	2015 FV_{171}	—	October 8, 2012	Kitt Peak	Spacewatch	·	2.3 km	MPC · JPL
560205	2015 FD_{172}	—	October 22, 2006	Catalina	CSS	EOS	2.5 km	MPC · JPL
560206	2015 FW_{174}	—	July 30, 2005	Palomar	NEAT	·	3.7 km	MPC · JPL
560207	2015 FZ_{174}	—	January 28, 2015	Haleakala	Pan-STARRS 1	·	2.8 km	MPC · JPL
560208	2015 FQ_{175}	—	January 28, 2015	Haleakala	Pan-STARRS 1	·	2.8 km	MPC · JPL
560209	2015 FU_{176}	—	June 11, 2011	Haleakala	Pan-STARRS 1	·	3.6 km	MPC · JPL
560210	2015 FP_{177}	—	March 7, 2008	Mount Lemmon	Mount Lemmon Survey	·	4.6 km	MPC · JPL
560211	2015 FM_{178}	—	October 17, 2012	Haleakala	Pan-STARRS 1	·	2.8 km	MPC · JPL
560212	2015 FY_{178}	—	January 18, 2009	Mount Lemmon	Mount Lemmon Survey	·	1.9 km	MPC · JPL
560213	2015 FF_{181}	—	October 18, 2012	Haleakala	Pan-STARRS 1	VER	2.2 km	MPC · JPL
560214	2015 FK_{181}	—	April 10, 2010	Mount Lemmon	Mount Lemmon Survey	EOS	1.5 km	MPC · JPL
560215	2015 FU_{181}	—	October 11, 2012	Haleakala	Pan-STARRS 1	LUT	3.4 km	MPC · JPL
560216	2015 FQ_{182}	—	January 18, 2009	Kitt Peak	Spacewatch	·	2.0 km	MPC · JPL
560217	2015 FL_{184}	—	September 20, 2001	Kitt Peak	Spacewatch	·	2.2 km	MPC · JPL
560218	2015 FM_{187}	—	August 28, 2013	Mount Lemmon	Mount Lemmon Survey	T_{j} (2.98)	2.9 km	MPC · JPL
560219	2015 FF_{188}	—	June 21, 2006	Catalina	CSS	TIR	3.2 km	MPC · JPL
560220	2015 FA_{189}	—	October 10, 2012	Mount Lemmon	Mount Lemmon Survey	·	2.6 km	MPC · JPL
560221	2015 FD_{189}	—	November 28, 2013	Mount Lemmon	Mount Lemmon Survey	·	2.9 km	MPC · JPL
560222	2015 FM_{189}	—	January 18, 2015	Haleakala	Pan-STARRS 1	·	2.8 km	MPC · JPL
560223	2015 FF_{190}	—	October 10, 2007	Catalina	CSS	T_{j} (2.99) · EUP	2.7 km	MPC · JPL
560224	2015 FQ_{190}	—	February 23, 2015	Haleakala	Pan-STARRS 1	EOS	2.1 km	MPC · JPL
560225	2015 FT_{190}	—	December 30, 2008	Mount Lemmon	Mount Lemmon Survey	·	2.7 km	MPC · JPL
560226	2015 FZ_{190}	—	October 22, 2008	Kitt Peak	Spacewatch	·	1.9 km	MPC · JPL
560227	2015 FQ_{191}	—	February 23, 2015	Haleakala	Pan-STARRS 1	·	2.7 km	MPC · JPL
560228	2015 FT_{191}	—	September 13, 2012	ESA OGS	ESA OGS	·	2.9 km	MPC · JPL
560229	2015 FF_{192}	—	February 20, 2015	Haleakala	Pan-STARRS 1	·	710 m	MPC · JPL
560230	2015 FO_{193}	—	August 20, 2001	Cerro Tololo	Deep Ecliptic Survey	·	2.0 km	MPC · JPL
560231	2015 FK_{195}	—	August 29, 2006	Catalina	CSS	·	2.6 km	MPC · JPL
560232	2015 FR_{195}	—	September 28, 2013	Mount Lemmon	Mount Lemmon Survey	·	2.2 km	MPC · JPL
560233	2015 FX_{195}	—	December 31, 2008	Mount Lemmon	Mount Lemmon Survey	·	2.7 km	MPC · JPL
560234	2015 FR_{197}	—	January 23, 2015	Haleakala	Pan-STARRS 1	VER	2.5 km	MPC · JPL
560235	2015 FH_{200}	—	February 19, 2009	Kitt Peak	Spacewatch	·	2.7 km	MPC · JPL
560236	2015 FT_{201}	—	October 5, 2012	Haleakala	Pan-STARRS 1	·	2.7 km	MPC · JPL
560237	2015 FE_{204}	—	August 26, 2012	Haleakala	Pan-STARRS 1	·	1.8 km	MPC · JPL
560238	2015 FX_{204}	—	April 9, 2010	Mount Lemmon	Mount Lemmon Survey	EOS	1.4 km	MPC · JPL
560239	2015 FC_{207}	—	October 15, 2007	Mount Lemmon	Mount Lemmon Survey	·	1.7 km	MPC · JPL
560240	2015 FS_{210}	—	August 25, 2012	Kitt Peak	Spacewatch	EOS	2.0 km	MPC · JPL
560241	2015 FA_{212}	—	March 22, 2015	Haleakala	Pan-STARRS 1	·	2.4 km	MPC · JPL
560242	2015 FC_{212}	—	December 4, 2013	Haleakala	Pan-STARRS 1	·	3.4 km	MPC · JPL
560243	2015 FD_{212}	—	October 19, 2007	Mount Lemmon	Mount Lemmon Survey	·	1.9 km	MPC · JPL
560244	2015 FE_{212}	—	February 16, 2015	Haleakala	Pan-STARRS 1	·	2.4 km	MPC · JPL
560245	2015 FJ_{212}	—	December 25, 2013	Mount Lemmon	Mount Lemmon Survey	·	2.5 km	MPC · JPL
560246	2015 FG_{213}	—	March 22, 2015	Haleakala	Pan-STARRS 1	·	2.7 km	MPC · JPL
560247	2015 FU_{213}	—	November 18, 2007	Kitt Peak	Spacewatch	·	2.8 km	MPC · JPL
560248	2015 FU_{214}	—	October 12, 2007	Kitt Peak	Spacewatch	·	2.4 km	MPC · JPL
560249	2015 FQ_{215}	—	October 12, 2013	Kitt Peak	Spacewatch	·	2.4 km	MPC · JPL
560250	2015 FR_{215}	—	September 28, 2013	Mount Lemmon	Mount Lemmon Survey	EOS	1.6 km	MPC · JPL
560251	2015 FC_{216}	—	May 11, 2010	Mount Lemmon	Mount Lemmon Survey	·	2.2 km	MPC · JPL
560252	2015 FK_{216}	—	September 1, 2013	Mount Lemmon	Mount Lemmon Survey	·	2.6 km	MPC · JPL
560253	2015 FK_{217}	—	October 16, 2012	Mount Lemmon	Mount Lemmon Survey	EOS	1.6 km	MPC · JPL
560254	2015 FG_{218}	—	August 18, 2006	Kitt Peak	Spacewatch	·	2.4 km	MPC · JPL
560255	2015 FK_{218}	—	August 22, 1995	Kitt Peak	Spacewatch	·	2.3 km	MPC · JPL
560256	2015 FL_{222}	—	November 10, 2013	Mount Lemmon	Mount Lemmon Survey	·	1.7 km	MPC · JPL
560257	2015 FO_{222}	—	March 23, 2015	Haleakala	Pan-STARRS 1	·	2.0 km	MPC · JPL
560258	2015 FW_{224}	—	January 31, 2009	Mount Lemmon	Mount Lemmon Survey	VER	2.0 km	MPC · JPL
560259	2015 FC_{225}	—	February 16, 2015	Haleakala	Pan-STARRS 1	·	2.3 km	MPC · JPL
560260	2015 FH_{225}	—	December 22, 2008	Kitt Peak	Spacewatch	·	1.6 km	MPC · JPL
560261	2015 FA_{230}	—	March 23, 2015	Haleakala	Pan-STARRS 1	URS	3.1 km	MPC · JPL
560262	2015 FB_{230}	—	September 18, 2011	Mount Lemmon	Mount Lemmon Survey	·	2.6 km	MPC · JPL
560263	2015 FH_{230}	—	April 20, 2010	Mount Lemmon	Mount Lemmon Survey	·	3.1 km	MPC · JPL
560264	2015 FV_{231}	—	February 16, 2015	Haleakala	Pan-STARRS 1	·	2.3 km	MPC · JPL
560265	2015 FU_{233}	—	January 23, 2015	Haleakala	Pan-STARRS 1	·	2.6 km	MPC · JPL
560266	2015 FV_{233}	—	April 9, 2010	Mount Lemmon	Mount Lemmon Survey	EOS	1.8 km	MPC · JPL
560267	2015 FF_{234}	—	January 23, 2015	Haleakala	Pan-STARRS 1	·	2.7 km	MPC · JPL
560268	2015 FG_{235}	—	June 5, 2011	Mount Lemmon	Mount Lemmon Survey	·	2.7 km	MPC · JPL
560269	2015 FP_{236}	—	June 24, 2011	Kitt Peak	Spacewatch	·	2.5 km	MPC · JPL
560270	2015 FU_{238}	—	August 17, 2012	Haleakala	Pan-STARRS 1	·	1.8 km	MPC · JPL
560271	2015 FV_{239}	—	June 30, 2005	Kitt Peak	Spacewatch	·	3.2 km	MPC · JPL
560272	2015 FV_{240}	—	January 1, 2009	Mount Lemmon	Mount Lemmon Survey	(1298)	2.9 km	MPC · JPL
560273	2015 FE_{242}	—	October 2, 2006	Kitt Peak	Spacewatch	·	2.5 km	MPC · JPL
560274	2015 FV_{242}	—	February 4, 2009	Mount Lemmon	Mount Lemmon Survey	VER	2.2 km	MPC · JPL
560275	2015 FV_{243}	—	March 23, 2015	Haleakala	Pan-STARRS 1	HYG	2.5 km	MPC · JPL
560276	2015 FZ_{243}	—	May 7, 2010	Mount Lemmon	Mount Lemmon Survey	·	2.4 km	MPC · JPL
560277	2015 FD_{244}	—	December 30, 2013	Haleakala	Pan-STARRS 1	·	2.7 km	MPC · JPL
560278	2015 FJ_{244}	—	January 21, 2015	Haleakala	Pan-STARRS 1	·	2.6 km	MPC · JPL
560279	2015 FR_{244}	—	March 23, 2015	Haleakala	Pan-STARRS 1	·	3.3 km	MPC · JPL
560280	2015 FJ_{245}	—	March 23, 2015	Haleakala	Pan-STARRS 1	·	2.6 km	MPC · JPL
560281	2015 FC_{248}	—	February 1, 2009	Kitt Peak	Spacewatch	·	2.6 km	MPC · JPL
560282	2015 FV_{248}	—	September 15, 2012	Catalina	CSS	·	3.3 km	MPC · JPL
560283	2015 FZ_{249}	—	August 19, 2006	Kitt Peak	Spacewatch	·	2.0 km	MPC · JPL
560284	2015 FA_{250}	—	March 23, 2015	Haleakala	Pan-STARRS 1	EOS	1.4 km	MPC · JPL
560285	2015 FH_{252}	—	October 7, 2012	Haleakala	Pan-STARRS 1	(31811)	2.4 km	MPC · JPL
560286	2015 FT_{252}	—	February 18, 2015	Haleakala	Pan-STARRS 1	·	2.1 km	MPC · JPL
560287	2015 FW_{252}	—	April 24, 2004	Kitt Peak	Spacewatch	·	2.3 km	MPC · JPL
560288	2015 FG_{253}	—	September 10, 2007	Kitt Peak	Spacewatch	·	2.0 km	MPC · JPL
560289	2015 FN_{253}	—	September 23, 2013	Kitt Peak	Spacewatch	·	520 m	MPC · JPL
560290	2015 FB_{254}	—	October 26, 2001	Kitt Peak	Spacewatch	·	2.6 km	MPC · JPL
560291	2015 FF_{256}	—	March 18, 2004	Kitt Peak	Spacewatch	·	2.3 km	MPC · JPL
560292	2015 FX_{256}	—	January 3, 2009	Mount Lemmon	Mount Lemmon Survey	·	2.2 km	MPC · JPL
560293	2015 FH_{258}	—	October 12, 2007	Kitt Peak	Spacewatch	·	2.2 km	MPC · JPL
560294	2015 FJ_{258}	—	September 21, 2012	Kitt Peak	Spacewatch	·	2.4 km	MPC · JPL
560295	2015 FA_{261}	—	May 26, 2011	Mount Lemmon	Mount Lemmon Survey	KOR	1.7 km	MPC · JPL
560296	2015 FW_{261}	—	September 19, 2006	Catalina	CSS	VER	2.8 km	MPC · JPL
560297	2015 FG_{262}	—	February 15, 2015	Haleakala	Pan-STARRS 1	EOS	1.6 km	MPC · JPL
560298	2015 FJ_{262}	—	April 10, 2010	Mount Lemmon	Mount Lemmon Survey	·	1.6 km	MPC · JPL
560299	2015 FY_{262}	—	November 27, 2013	Haleakala	Pan-STARRS 1	·	1.6 km	MPC · JPL
560300	2015 FU_{263}	—	August 17, 2012	Haleakala	Pan-STARRS 1	EOS	1.5 km	MPC · JPL

== 560301–560400 ==
back to top

Designation			Discovery			Properties		Ref
Permanent	Provisional	Named after	Date	Site	Discoverer(s)	Category	Diam.	Ref
560301	2015 FM_{264}	—	September 19, 2007	Kitt Peak	Spacewatch	·	3.2 km	MPC · JPL
560302	2015 FS_{264}	—	December 22, 1998	Kitt Peak	Spacewatch	·	1.9 km	MPC · JPL
560303	2015 FT_{264}	—	September 15, 2007	Mount Lemmon	Mount Lemmon Survey	·	3.3 km	MPC · JPL
560304	2015 FW_{267}	—	January 25, 2009	Kitt Peak	Spacewatch	·	2.6 km	MPC · JPL
560305	2015 FD_{268}	—	January 18, 2009	Kitt Peak	Spacewatch	·	2.7 km	MPC · JPL
560306	2015 FL_{268}	—	February 16, 2015	Haleakala	Pan-STARRS 1	·	1.9 km	MPC · JPL
560307	2015 FU_{268}	—	January 1, 2009	Kitt Peak	Spacewatch	·	2.8 km	MPC · JPL
560308	2015 FY_{268}	—	March 16, 2010	Kitt Peak	Spacewatch	·	1.7 km	MPC · JPL
560309	2015 FL_{269}	—	February 18, 2015	Kitt Peak	Research and Education Collaborative Occultation Network	·	1.8 km	MPC · JPL
560310	2015 FG_{270}	—	November 2, 2007	Mount Lemmon	Mount Lemmon Survey	·	2.2 km	MPC · JPL
560311	2015 FY_{270}	—	February 18, 2015	Haleakala	Pan-STARRS 1	EOS	1.5 km	MPC · JPL
560312	2015 FC_{271}	—	February 19, 2015	Haleakala	Pan-STARRS 1	·	830 m	MPC · JPL
560313	2015 FF_{271}	—	February 16, 2015	Haleakala	Pan-STARRS 1	EUN	1.2 km	MPC · JPL
560314	2015 FK_{271}	—	November 10, 1996	Kitt Peak	Spacewatch	·	2.6 km	MPC · JPL
560315	2015 FY_{271}	—	March 18, 2010	Mount Lemmon	Mount Lemmon Survey	·	2.4 km	MPC · JPL
560316	2015 FZ_{271}	—	September 14, 2007	Kitt Peak	Spacewatch	·	2.1 km	MPC · JPL
560317	2015 FB_{272}	—	January 28, 2015	Haleakala	Pan-STARRS 1	VER	2.0 km	MPC · JPL
560318	2015 FC_{272}	—	November 9, 2013	Kitt Peak	Spacewatch	·	1.7 km	MPC · JPL
560319	2015 FH_{274}	—	January 21, 2015	Haleakala	Pan-STARRS 1	TEL	1.4 km	MPC · JPL
560320	2015 FJ_{274}	—	January 21, 2015	Haleakala	Pan-STARRS 1	·	1.5 km	MPC · JPL
560321	2015 FL_{274}	—	November 28, 2013	Haleakala	Pan-STARRS 1	·	2.1 km	MPC · JPL
560322	2015 FQ_{274}	—	January 21, 2015	Haleakala	Pan-STARRS 1	·	2.0 km	MPC · JPL
560323	2015 FR_{274}	—	February 17, 2015	Haleakala	Pan-STARRS 1	·	2.5 km	MPC · JPL
560324	2015 FU_{274}	—	July 28, 2011	Haleakala	Pan-STARRS 1	·	2.3 km	MPC · JPL
560325	2015 FX_{274}	—	May 8, 2010	Mount Lemmon	Mount Lemmon Survey	·	2.6 km	MPC · JPL
560326	2015 FB_{275}	—	February 17, 2015	Haleakala	Pan-STARRS 1	EOS	1.7 km	MPC · JPL
560327	2015 FD_{275}	—	February 17, 2015	Haleakala	Pan-STARRS 1	·	2.2 km	MPC · JPL
560328	2015 FW_{275}	—	May 5, 2010	Catalina	CSS	·	2.2 km	MPC · JPL
560329	2015 FB_{276}	—	October 16, 2012	Mount Lemmon	Mount Lemmon Survey	·	2.5 km	MPC · JPL
560330	2015 FL_{276}	—	January 21, 2015	Haleakala	Pan-STARRS 1	EOS	1.5 km	MPC · JPL
560331	2015 FV_{276}	—	October 15, 2012	Haleakala	Pan-STARRS 1	·	2.4 km	MPC · JPL
560332	2015 FG_{277}	—	April 8, 2010	Kitt Peak	Spacewatch	·	2.8 km	MPC · JPL
560333	2015 FV_{278}	—	May 28, 2011	Mount Lemmon	Mount Lemmon Survey	·	3.3 km	MPC · JPL
560334	2015 FV_{280}	—	October 11, 2012	Mount Lemmon	Mount Lemmon Survey	·	2.5 km	MPC · JPL
560335	2015 FA_{281}	—	September 13, 2007	Mount Lemmon	Mount Lemmon Survey	EOS	1.9 km	MPC · JPL
560336	2015 FE_{281}	—	January 1, 2009	Kitt Peak	Spacewatch	EOS	1.3 km	MPC · JPL
560337	2015 FF_{281}	—	October 20, 2007	Mount Lemmon	Mount Lemmon Survey	·	2.4 km	MPC · JPL
560338	2015 FN_{281}	—	November 3, 2007	Mount Lemmon	Mount Lemmon Survey	·	2.5 km	MPC · JPL
560339	2015 FS_{282}	—	January 19, 2015	Haleakala	Pan-STARRS 1	(5)	930 m	MPC · JPL
560340	2015 FT_{282}	—	September 14, 2007	Mount Lemmon	Mount Lemmon Survey	EOS	2.0 km	MPC · JPL
560341	2015 FG_{283}	—	February 28, 2009	Mount Lemmon	Mount Lemmon Survey	·	2.4 km	MPC · JPL
560342	2015 FT_{283}	—	February 11, 2004	Kitt Peak	Spacewatch	·	2.4 km	MPC · JPL
560343	2015 FU_{287}	—	November 24, 2008	Kitt Peak	Spacewatch	·	1.8 km	MPC · JPL
560344	2015 FX_{287}	—	December 29, 2014	Haleakala	Pan-STARRS 1	·	2.2 km	MPC · JPL
560345	2015 FG_{288}	—	December 30, 2008	Kitt Peak	Spacewatch	·	2.3 km	MPC · JPL
560346	2015 FN_{288}	—	December 4, 2007	Catalina	CSS	·	4.6 km	MPC · JPL
560347	2015 FP_{288}	—	October 3, 2013	Haleakala	Pan-STARRS 1	·	2.8 km	MPC · JPL
560348	2015 FX_{288}	—	January 27, 2015	Haleakala	Pan-STARRS 1	·	2.6 km	MPC · JPL
560349	2015 FC_{289}	—	April 11, 2010	Mount Lemmon	Mount Lemmon Survey	·	3.1 km	MPC · JPL
560350	2015 FU_{290}	—	August 2, 2011	Charleston	R. Holmes	·	2.9 km	MPC · JPL
560351	2015 FW_{290}	—	January 3, 2009	Mount Lemmon	Mount Lemmon Survey	·	2.8 km	MPC · JPL
560352	2015 FG_{291}	—	December 19, 2003	Kitt Peak	Spacewatch	EOS	1.6 km	MPC · JPL
560353	2015 FN_{291}	—	December 21, 2008	Mount Lemmon	Mount Lemmon Survey	EOS	2.1 km	MPC · JPL
560354 Chrisnolan	2015 FW_{291}	Chrisnolan	November 26, 2013	Tincana	Zolnowski, M., Kusiak, M.	·	2.5 km	MPC · JPL
560355	2015 FH_{292}	—	January 1, 2009	Kitt Peak	Spacewatch	·	2.3 km	MPC · JPL
560356	2015 FL_{292}	—	May 14, 2010	Mount Lemmon	Mount Lemmon Survey	·	2.9 km	MPC · JPL
560357	2015 FP_{292}	—	September 19, 2007	Kitt Peak	Spacewatch	·	2.4 km	MPC · JPL
560358	2015 FF_{293}	—	September 17, 2006	Kitt Peak	Spacewatch	·	2.5 km	MPC · JPL
560359	2015 FJ_{293}	—	October 9, 2007	Kitt Peak	Spacewatch	TIR	2.5 km	MPC · JPL
560360	2015 FQ_{293}	—	November 12, 2012	Haleakala	Pan-STARRS 1	·	4.5 km	MPC · JPL
560361	2015 FC_{294}	—	August 6, 2005	Palomar	NEAT	·	3.1 km	MPC · JPL
560362	2015 FR_{294}	—	March 28, 2015	Haleakala	Pan-STARRS 1	·	2.8 km	MPC · JPL
560363	2015 FM_{295}	—	January 22, 2015	Haleakala	Pan-STARRS 1	·	2.6 km	MPC · JPL
560364	2015 FN_{295}	—	January 22, 2015	Haleakala	Pan-STARRS 1	·	3.3 km	MPC · JPL
560365	2015 FG_{297}	—	November 11, 2007	Mount Lemmon	Mount Lemmon Survey	·	4.3 km	MPC · JPL
560366	2015 FH_{297}	—	March 23, 2003	Apache Point	SDSS Collaboration	·	3.3 km	MPC · JPL
560367	2015 FJ_{297}	—	March 21, 2004	Kitt Peak	Spacewatch	·	2.5 km	MPC · JPL
560368	2015 FM_{301}	—	January 14, 2002	Palomar	NEAT	·	3.8 km	MPC · JPL
560369	2015 FO_{301}	—	February 1, 2003	Kitt Peak	Spacewatch	·	3.1 km	MPC · JPL
560370	2015 FU_{304}	—	March 28, 2015	Haleakala	Pan-STARRS 1	EUN	1.1 km	MPC · JPL
560371	2015 FX_{304}	—	March 28, 2015	Haleakala	Pan-STARRS 1	·	800 m	MPC · JPL
560372	2015 FC_{306}	—	January 23, 2015	Haleakala	Pan-STARRS 1	·	2.4 km	MPC · JPL
560373	2015 FS_{306}	—	November 11, 2001	Apache Point	SDSS Collaboration	·	2.4 km	MPC · JPL
560374	2015 FC_{307}	—	November 18, 2007	Kitt Peak	Spacewatch	·	2.7 km	MPC · JPL
560375	2015 FD_{307}	—	December 5, 2007	Kitt Peak	Spacewatch	·	3.2 km	MPC · JPL
560376	2015 FE_{307}	—	December 30, 2013	Haleakala	Pan-STARRS 1	·	2.6 km	MPC · JPL
560377	2015 FQ_{307}	—	September 15, 2012	Kitt Peak	Spacewatch	·	3.1 km	MPC · JPL
560378	2015 FO_{308}	—	March 25, 2015	Haleakala	Pan-STARRS 1	·	2.3 km	MPC · JPL
560379	2015 FB_{309}	—	January 20, 2009	Mount Lemmon	Mount Lemmon Survey	·	2.1 km	MPC · JPL
560380	2015 FW_{311}	—	January 31, 2009	Mount Lemmon	Mount Lemmon Survey	·	2.3 km	MPC · JPL
560381	2015 FD_{313}	—	February 22, 2009	Kitt Peak	Spacewatch	·	3.2 km	MPC · JPL
560382	2015 FG_{313}	—	January 5, 2014	Haleakala	Pan-STARRS 1	·	3.3 km	MPC · JPL
560383	2015 FQ_{314}	—	January 23, 2015	Haleakala	Pan-STARRS 1	·	2.3 km	MPC · JPL
560384	2015 FV_{314}	—	March 25, 2015	Haleakala	Pan-STARRS 1	·	2.4 km	MPC · JPL
560385	2015 FZ_{314}	—	January 24, 2014	Haleakala	Pan-STARRS 1	VER	2.4 km	MPC · JPL
560386	2015 FL_{315}	—	February 3, 2009	Kitt Peak	Spacewatch	·	2.1 km	MPC · JPL
560387	2015 FC_{317}	—	March 1, 2009	Kitt Peak	Spacewatch	·	2.5 km	MPC · JPL
560388 Normafa	2015 FX_{317}	Normafa	October 21, 2012	Piszkéstető	K. Sárneczky, G. Hodosán	·	3.0 km	MPC · JPL
560389	2015 FQ_{318}	—	April 22, 1998	Kitt Peak	Spacewatch	·	2.4 km	MPC · JPL
560390	2015 FY_{318}	—	October 20, 2007	Mount Lemmon	Mount Lemmon Survey	·	2.7 km	MPC · JPL
560391	2015 FA_{320}	—	October 2, 2006	Catalina	CSS	·	3.1 km	MPC · JPL
560392	2015 FO_{320}	—	December 23, 2013	Mount Lemmon	Mount Lemmon Survey	·	3.2 km	MPC · JPL
560393	2015 FV_{321}	—	January 31, 2009	Mount Lemmon	Mount Lemmon Survey	·	2.3 km	MPC · JPL
560394	2015 FH_{322}	—	March 25, 2015	Haleakala	Pan-STARRS 1	·	2.8 km	MPC · JPL
560395	2015 FO_{322}	—	March 25, 2015	Haleakala	Pan-STARRS 1	·	2.4 km	MPC · JPL
560396	2015 FD_{323}	—	April 22, 2004	Kitt Peak	Spacewatch	·	2.4 km	MPC · JPL
560397	2015 FZ_{323}	—	December 30, 2013	Mount Lemmon	Mount Lemmon Survey	(31811)	2.9 km	MPC · JPL
560398	2015 FK_{325}	—	March 23, 2003	Apache Point	SDSS Collaboration	·	3.1 km	MPC · JPL
560399	2015 FR_{325}	—	March 25, 2015	Haleakala	Pan-STARRS 1	·	2.6 km	MPC · JPL
560400	2015 FA_{326}	—	July 9, 2005	Kitt Peak	Spacewatch	VER	2.7 km	MPC · JPL

== 560401–560500 ==
back to top

Designation			Discovery			Properties		Ref
Permanent	Provisional	Named after	Date	Site	Discoverer(s)	Category	Diam.	Ref
560401	2015 FY_{327}	—	January 2, 2014	Kitt Peak	Spacewatch	·	2.9 km	MPC · JPL
560402	2015 FC_{328}	—	March 25, 2015	Haleakala	Pan-STARRS 1	ELF	2.8 km	MPC · JPL
560403	2015 FW_{328}	—	December 24, 2013	Mount Lemmon	Mount Lemmon Survey	·	3.2 km	MPC · JPL
560404	2015 FB_{329}	—	March 25, 2015	Haleakala	Pan-STARRS 1	·	2.7 km	MPC · JPL
560405	2015 FP_{329}	—	April 13, 2004	Kitt Peak	Spacewatch	EUP	3.2 km	MPC · JPL
560406	2015 FB_{331}	—	July 21, 2006	Mount Lemmon	Mount Lemmon Survey	·	3.1 km	MPC · JPL
560407	2015 FD_{331}	—	December 31, 2008	Mount Lemmon	Mount Lemmon Survey	·	2.5 km	MPC · JPL
560408	2015 FH_{334}	—	April 19, 2009	Mount Lemmon	Mount Lemmon Survey	·	3.4 km	MPC · JPL
560409	2015 FQ_{334}	—	July 30, 2005	Palomar	NEAT	·	3.3 km	MPC · JPL
560410	2015 FU_{337}	—	January 11, 2008	Kitt Peak	Spacewatch	·	580 m	MPC · JPL
560411	2015 FM_{339}	—	November 27, 2013	Haleakala	Pan-STARRS 1	·	2.7 km	MPC · JPL
560412	2015 FM_{341}	—	February 19, 2010	Kitt Peak	Spacewatch	·	3.9 km	MPC · JPL
560413	2015 FF_{343}	—	January 31, 2015	Haleakala	Pan-STARRS 1	THB	2.8 km	MPC · JPL
560414	2015 FQ_{345}	—	March 24, 2015	Haleakala	Pan-STARRS 1	SDO	155 km	MPC · JPL
560415	2015 FS_{346}	—	February 13, 2010	Mount Lemmon	Mount Lemmon Survey	EOS	1.6 km	MPC · JPL
560416	2015 FV_{346}	—	April 30, 2011	Kitt Peak	Spacewatch	(1298)	2.5 km	MPC · JPL
560417	2015 FQ_{347}	—	November 24, 2008	Mount Lemmon	Mount Lemmon Survey	·	1.7 km	MPC · JPL
560418	2015 FV_{349}	—	February 20, 2009	Mount Lemmon	Mount Lemmon Survey	·	2.9 km	MPC · JPL
560419	2015 FD_{350}	—	June 28, 2011	Mount Lemmon	Mount Lemmon Survey	·	3.5 km	MPC · JPL
560420	2015 FF_{351}	—	March 16, 2015	Haleakala	Pan-STARRS 1	·	2.6 km	MPC · JPL
560421	2015 FP_{351}	—	January 29, 2015	Haleakala	Pan-STARRS 1	H	490 m	MPC · JPL
560422	2015 FF_{352}	—	June 17, 2010	WISE	WISE	·	2.5 km	MPC · JPL
560423	2015 FS_{353}	—	October 21, 2012	Haleakala	Pan-STARRS 1	·	2.9 km	MPC · JPL
560424	2015 FA_{354}	—	March 21, 2009	Mount Lemmon	Mount Lemmon Survey	·	2.8 km	MPC · JPL
560425	2015 FR_{354}	—	August 26, 2011	Kitt Peak	Spacewatch	·	2.4 km	MPC · JPL
560426	2015 FA_{356}	—	September 17, 2006	Kitt Peak	Spacewatch	(31811)	2.3 km	MPC · JPL
560427	2015 FY_{357}	—	March 17, 2015	Haleakala	Pan-STARRS 1	·	2.6 km	MPC · JPL
560428	2015 FE_{362}	—	August 27, 2011	Haleakala	Pan-STARRS 1	·	2.4 km	MPC · JPL
560429	2015 FR_{362}	—	February 24, 2014	Haleakala	Pan-STARRS 1	·	3.3 km	MPC · JPL
560430	2015 FN_{363}	—	September 18, 2007	Kitt Peak	Spacewatch	·	2.7 km	MPC · JPL
560431	2015 FD_{366}	—	November 12, 2013	Mount Lemmon	Mount Lemmon Survey	·	2.8 km	MPC · JPL
560432	2015 FC_{367}	—	December 31, 2008	Bergisch Gladbach	W. Bickel	·	2.7 km	MPC · JPL
560433	2015 FF_{367}	—	September 30, 2003	Kitt Peak	Spacewatch	·	2.3 km	MPC · JPL
560434	2015 FV_{367}	—	February 20, 2015	Haleakala	Pan-STARRS 1	EOS	1.4 km	MPC · JPL
560435	2015 FB_{368}	—	August 21, 2001	Haleakala	NEAT	·	2.7 km	MPC · JPL
560436	2015 FH_{368}	—	August 12, 2012	Kitt Peak	Spacewatch	·	2.4 km	MPC · JPL
560437	2015 FM_{371}	—	October 17, 2012	Mount Lemmon	Mount Lemmon Survey	·	2.6 km	MPC · JPL
560438	2015 FO_{372}	—	March 3, 2009	Catalina	CSS	·	3.2 km	MPC · JPL
560439	2015 FJ_{373}	—	February 16, 2015	Haleakala	Pan-STARRS 1	·	3.0 km	MPC · JPL
560440	2015 FO_{373}	—	May 27, 1998	Kitt Peak	Spacewatch	·	3.9 km	MPC · JPL
560441	2015 FD_{375}	—	October 31, 2007	Mount Lemmon	Mount Lemmon Survey	·	2.3 km	MPC · JPL
560442	2015 FP_{375}	—	November 10, 2013	Kitt Peak	Spacewatch	·	2.5 km	MPC · JPL
560443	2015 FS_{376}	—	February 4, 2009	Kitt Peak	Spacewatch	·	2.6 km	MPC · JPL
560444	2015 FW_{376}	—	October 13, 2007	Dauban	Kugel, F.	EOS	2.0 km	MPC · JPL
560445	2015 FC_{377}	—	February 20, 2015	Haleakala	Pan-STARRS 1	·	2.1 km	MPC · JPL
560446	2015 FF_{377}	—	November 27, 2013	Haleakala	Pan-STARRS 1	·	2.4 km	MPC · JPL
560447	2015 FJ_{377}	—	January 26, 2015	Haleakala	Pan-STARRS 1	EOS	1.6 km	MPC · JPL
560448	2015 FN_{377}	—	January 26, 2015	Haleakala	Pan-STARRS 1	·	2.6 km	MPC · JPL
560449	2015 FW_{377}	—	November 28, 2013	Mount Lemmon	Mount Lemmon Survey	·	2.1 km	MPC · JPL
560450	2015 FU_{378}	—	November 4, 2007	Kitt Peak	Spacewatch	·	2.3 km	MPC · JPL
560451	2015 FV_{378}	—	May 4, 2005	Mount Lemmon	Mount Lemmon Survey	EOS	1.4 km	MPC · JPL
560452	2015 FK_{379}	—	October 25, 2013	Kitt Peak	Spacewatch	·	1.9 km	MPC · JPL
560453	2015 FR_{381}	—	November 9, 2007	Mount Lemmon	Mount Lemmon Survey	·	2.7 km	MPC · JPL
560454	2015 FX_{381}	—	September 24, 2012	Mount Lemmon	Mount Lemmon Survey	EOS	1.8 km	MPC · JPL
560455	2015 FB_{382}	—	August 10, 2007	Kitt Peak	Spacewatch	·	2.5 km	MPC · JPL
560456	2015 FF_{382}	—	September 23, 2007	Altschwendt	W. Ries	·	2.7 km	MPC · JPL
560457	2015 FQ_{382}	—	September 24, 2012	Mount Lemmon	Mount Lemmon Survey	TEL	1.2 km	MPC · JPL
560458	2015 FK_{383}	—	November 26, 2013	Haleakala	Pan-STARRS 1	·	1.5 km	MPC · JPL
560459	2015 FE_{384}	—	September 12, 2001	Kitt Peak	Deep Ecliptic Survey	·	2.5 km	MPC · JPL
560460	2015 FX_{384}	—	November 2, 2013	Kitt Peak	Spacewatch	·	2.0 km	MPC · JPL
560461	2015 FP_{385}	—	October 12, 2007	Mount Lemmon	Mount Lemmon Survey	·	2.2 km	MPC · JPL
560462	2015 FQ_{386}	—	November 18, 2007	Mount Lemmon	Mount Lemmon Survey	·	2.8 km	MPC · JPL
560463	2015 FN_{387}	—	October 3, 2013	Kitt Peak	Spacewatch	·	2.1 km	MPC · JPL
560464	2015 FD_{388}	—	November 6, 2013	Mount Lemmon	Mount Lemmon Survey	·	890 m	MPC · JPL
560465	2015 FL_{388}	—	November 18, 2007	Mount Lemmon	Mount Lemmon Survey	EOS	1.7 km	MPC · JPL
560466	2015 FX_{388}	—	March 7, 2003	Kitt Peak	Spacewatch	·	3.4 km	MPC · JPL
560467	2015 FP_{389}	—	October 13, 2006	Calvin-Rehoboth	L. A. Molnar	ELF	3.8 km	MPC · JPL
560468	2015 FL_{390}	—	October 11, 2012	Haleakala	Pan-STARRS 1	·	2.3 km	MPC · JPL
560469	2015 FM_{392}	—	January 25, 2015	Haleakala	Pan-STARRS 1	·	4.0 km	MPC · JPL
560470	2015 FM_{393}	—	January 8, 2013	Mount Lemmon	Mount Lemmon Survey	L4	10 km	MPC · JPL
560471	2015 FS_{397}	—	September 19, 2011	Mount Lemmon	Mount Lemmon Survey	·	2.7 km	MPC · JPL
560472	2015 FC_{402}	—	March 22, 2015	Mount Lemmon	Mount Lemmon Survey	·	2.4 km	MPC · JPL
560473	2015 FY_{402}	—	February 13, 2008	Mount Lemmon	Mount Lemmon Survey	·	2.6 km	MPC · JPL
560474	2015 FX_{403}	—	April 7, 2010	Kitt Peak	Spacewatch	·	2.7 km	MPC · JPL
560475	2015 FJ_{404}	—	March 31, 2009	Mount Lemmon	Mount Lemmon Survey	·	3.1 km	MPC · JPL
560476	2015 FE_{405}	—	March 29, 2015	Haleakala	Pan-STARRS 1	·	3.0 km	MPC · JPL
560477	2015 FS_{405}	—	January 25, 2015	Haleakala	Pan-STARRS 1	·	2.8 km	MPC · JPL
560478	2015 FL_{407}	—	March 21, 2015	Haleakala	Pan-STARRS 1	·	2.0 km	MPC · JPL
560479	2015 FJ_{409}	—	February 4, 2009	Kitt Peak	Spacewatch	THM	2.1 km	MPC · JPL
560480	2015 FE_{411}	—	March 25, 2015	Haleakala	Pan-STARRS 1	LIX	3.2 km	MPC · JPL
560481	2015 FO_{411}	—	January 23, 2015	Haleakala	Pan-STARRS 1	·	2.4 km	MPC · JPL
560482	2015 FY_{413}	—	February 28, 2014	Haleakala	Pan-STARRS 1	LIX	2.3 km	MPC · JPL
560483	2015 FO_{416}	—	December 30, 2007	Mount Lemmon	Mount Lemmon Survey	·	3.6 km	MPC · JPL
560484	2015 FW_{418}	—	August 28, 2005	Kitt Peak	Spacewatch	·	1.9 km	MPC · JPL
560485	2015 FY_{420}	—	July 25, 2017	Haleakala	Pan-STARRS 1	·	1.7 km	MPC · JPL
560486	2015 FM_{424}	—	November 8, 2007	Kitt Peak	Spacewatch	·	2.9 km	MPC · JPL
560487	2015 FP_{424}	—	March 18, 2015	Haleakala	Pan-STARRS 1	·	2.9 km	MPC · JPL
560488	2015 FG_{427}	—	October 17, 2012	Haleakala	Pan-STARRS 1	·	2.3 km	MPC · JPL
560489	2015 FK_{428}	—	March 27, 2015	Haleakala	Pan-STARRS 1	·	2.6 km	MPC · JPL
560490	2015 FG_{434}	—	March 28, 2015	Haleakala	Pan-STARRS 1	·	2.7 km	MPC · JPL
560491	2015 FN_{442}	—	March 25, 2015	Haleakala	Pan-STARRS 1	·	1.2 km	MPC · JPL
560492	2015 GH_{2}	—	November 9, 2013	Haleakala	Pan-STARRS 1	TIR	3.0 km	MPC · JPL
560493	2015 GR_{6}	—	December 30, 2013	Mount Lemmon	Mount Lemmon Survey	EOS	1.9 km	MPC · JPL
560494	2015 GX_{7}	—	August 10, 2005	Siding Spring	SSS	·	4.5 km	MPC · JPL
560495	2015 GX_{8}	—	March 24, 2015	Haleakala	Pan-STARRS 1	·	2.3 km	MPC · JPL
560496	2015 GO_{9}	—	January 1, 2014	Kitt Peak	Spacewatch	·	3.3 km	MPC · JPL
560497	2015 GP_{9}	—	December 31, 2008	Kitt Peak	Spacewatch	·	2.5 km	MPC · JPL
560498	2015 GN_{10}	—	June 19, 2001	Palomar	NEAT	·	2.7 km	MPC · JPL
560499	2015 GY_{10}	—	December 31, 2007	Kitt Peak	Spacewatch	·	4.4 km	MPC · JPL
560500	2015 GH_{11}	—	August 16, 2012	Siding Spring	SSS	·	2.5 km	MPC · JPL

== 560501–560600 ==
back to top

Designation			Discovery			Properties		Ref
Permanent	Provisional	Named after	Date	Site	Discoverer(s)	Category	Diam.	Ref
560501	2015 GK_{11}	—	January 3, 2014	Mount Lemmon	Mount Lemmon Survey	TIR	2.4 km	MPC · JPL
560502	2015 GN_{11}	—	November 27, 2013	Haleakala	Pan-STARRS 1	TIR	2.2 km	MPC · JPL
560503	2015 GS_{11}	—	November 6, 2012	Mount Lemmon	Mount Lemmon Survey	·	2.9 km	MPC · JPL
560504	2015 GU_{11}	—	November 1, 2007	Kitt Peak	Spacewatch	·	2.9 km	MPC · JPL
560505	2015 GV_{11}	—	October 19, 2012	Haleakala	Pan-STARRS 1	·	3.1 km	MPC · JPL
560506	2015 GA_{12}	—	May 21, 2005	Mount Lemmon	Mount Lemmon Survey	·	2.6 km	MPC · JPL
560507	2015 GF_{14}	—	March 16, 2015	Haleakala	Pan-STARRS 1	·	2.3 km	MPC · JPL
560508	2015 GJ_{14}	—	October 11, 2012	Haleakala	Pan-STARRS 1	·	2.6 km	MPC · JPL
560509	2015 GW_{14}	—	October 12, 2007	Kitt Peak	Spacewatch	·	2.2 km	MPC · JPL
560510	2015 GE_{15}	—	November 14, 2006	Kitt Peak	Spacewatch	THM	2.3 km	MPC · JPL
560511	2015 GU_{16}	—	July 29, 2005	Palomar	NEAT	·	2.8 km	MPC · JPL
560512	2015 GC_{17}	—	May 21, 2005	Mount Lemmon	Mount Lemmon Survey	HYG	2.8 km	MPC · JPL
560513	2015 GG_{22}	—	April 12, 2015	Cerro Paranal	Altmann, M., Prusti, T.	(5)	770 m	MPC · JPL
560514	2015 GW_{22}	—	June 16, 2010	Kitt Peak	Spacewatch	·	4.3 km	MPC · JPL
560515	2015 GD_{23}	—	February 7, 2008	Mount Lemmon	Mount Lemmon Survey	·	2.9 km	MPC · JPL
560516	2015 GY_{24}	—	October 4, 2006	Mount Lemmon	Mount Lemmon Survey	·	3.6 km	MPC · JPL
560517	2015 GH_{25}	—	December 4, 2012	Mount Lemmon	Mount Lemmon Survey	·	3.0 km	MPC · JPL
560518	2015 GL_{25}	—	July 4, 2005	Palomar	NEAT	·	3.5 km	MPC · JPL
560519	2015 GE_{26}	—	March 16, 2009	Mount Lemmon	Mount Lemmon Survey	TIR	2.0 km	MPC · JPL
560520	2015 GJ_{28}	—	October 10, 2007	Mount Lemmon	Mount Lemmon Survey	URS	2.6 km	MPC · JPL
560521	2015 GX_{32}	—	January 21, 2014	Mount Lemmon	Mount Lemmon Survey	·	2.3 km	MPC · JPL
560522 Gombaszögi	2015 GB_{33}	Gombaszögi	October 20, 2012	Piszkéstető	K. Sárneczky, A. Király	VER	2.7 km	MPC · JPL
560523	2015 GS_{33}	—	February 23, 2015	Haleakala	Pan-STARRS 1	(3025)	2.7 km	MPC · JPL
560524	2015 GA_{36}	—	October 8, 2012	Mount Lemmon	Mount Lemmon Survey	·	2.4 km	MPC · JPL
560525	2015 GF_{36}	—	March 29, 2009	Mount Lemmon	Mount Lemmon Survey	HYG	2.2 km	MPC · JPL
560526	2015 GL_{37}	—	February 13, 2010	Mount Lemmon	Mount Lemmon Survey	·	1.6 km	MPC · JPL
560527	2015 GU_{38}	—	January 10, 2008	Mount Lemmon	Mount Lemmon Survey	·	2.9 km	MPC · JPL
560528	2015 GO_{39}	—	January 25, 2015	Haleakala	Pan-STARRS 1	·	2.5 km	MPC · JPL
560529	2015 GU_{39}	—	March 25, 2015	Haleakala	Pan-STARRS 1	·	2.7 km	MPC · JPL
560530	2015 GW_{39}	—	April 15, 2015	Haleakala	Pan-STARRS 1	·	4.2 km	MPC · JPL
560531	2015 GY_{40}	—	November 12, 2001	Apache Point	SDSS Collaboration	·	2.9 km	MPC · JPL
560532	2015 GK_{41}	—	March 25, 2015	Haleakala	Pan-STARRS 1	·	2.2 km	MPC · JPL
560533	2015 GW_{41}	—	May 19, 2010	Mount Lemmon	Mount Lemmon Survey	·	3.4 km	MPC · JPL
560534	2015 GB_{42}	—	March 22, 2015	Haleakala	Pan-STARRS 1	·	3.0 km	MPC · JPL
560535	2015 GG_{42}	—	March 22, 2015	Haleakala	Pan-STARRS 1	VER	2.5 km	MPC · JPL
560536	2015 GJ_{42}	—	February 16, 2015	Haleakala	Pan-STARRS 1	·	2.6 km	MPC · JPL
560537	2015 GR_{44}	—	March 22, 2015	Haleakala	Pan-STARRS 1	·	1.9 km	MPC · JPL
560538	2015 GZ_{44}	—	July 15, 2005	Mount Lemmon	Mount Lemmon Survey	·	2.9 km	MPC · JPL
560539	2015 GG_{46}	—	February 20, 2009	Mount Lemmon	Mount Lemmon Survey	·	2.4 km	MPC · JPL
560540	2015 GV_{46}	—	October 8, 2012	Haleakala	Pan-STARRS 1	·	2.7 km	MPC · JPL
560541	2015 GM_{47}	—	April 10, 2015	Mount Lemmon	Mount Lemmon Survey	·	2.4 km	MPC · JPL
560542	2015 GB_{48}	—	October 20, 2012	Haleakala	Pan-STARRS 1	·	2.9 km	MPC · JPL
560543	2015 GJ_{48}	—	November 13, 2012	Mount Lemmon	Mount Lemmon Survey	·	3.4 km	MPC · JPL
560544	2015 GL_{48}	—	December 28, 2013	Kitt Peak	Spacewatch	·	2.5 km	MPC · JPL
560545	2015 GM_{48}	—	November 11, 2001	Apache Point	SDSS Collaboration	·	2.8 km	MPC · JPL
560546	2015 GQ_{48}	—	February 16, 2015	Haleakala	Pan-STARRS 1	·	2.9 km	MPC · JPL
560547	2015 GR_{48}	—	December 16, 2007	Kitt Peak	Spacewatch	(31811)	3.2 km	MPC · JPL
560548	2015 GZ_{48}	—	March 25, 2015	Haleakala	Pan-STARRS 1	·	2.1 km	MPC · JPL
560549	2015 GH_{49}	—	January 30, 2009	Mount Lemmon	Mount Lemmon Survey	·	2.6 km	MPC · JPL
560550	2015 GL_{49}	—	July 27, 2011	Haleakala	Pan-STARRS 1	·	2.4 km	MPC · JPL
560551	2015 GB_{50}	—	May 4, 2010	Kitt Peak	Spacewatch	·	2.7 km	MPC · JPL
560552	2015 GO_{50}	—	April 13, 2015	Cerro Tololo	S. S. Sheppard, C. A. Trujillo	cubewano (hot)	259 km	MPC · JPL
560553	2015 GQ_{51}	—	January 20, 2015	Haleakala	Pan-STARRS 1	·	2.9 km	MPC · JPL
560554	2015 GV_{51}	—	July 5, 2005	Mount Lemmon	Mount Lemmon Survey	·	2.6 km	MPC · JPL
560555	2015 GZ_{51}	—	October 8, 2008	Mount Lemmon	Mount Lemmon Survey	EUP	3.4 km	MPC · JPL
560556	2015 GZ_{61}	—	April 13, 2015	Haleakala	Pan-STARRS 1	·	2.3 km	MPC · JPL
560557	2015 HQ	—	March 1, 2009	Kitt Peak	Spacewatch	·	2.5 km	MPC · JPL
560558	2015 HG_{3}	—	January 22, 2015	Haleakala	Pan-STARRS 1	·	1.7 km	MPC · JPL
560559	2015 HK_{4}	—	January 20, 2015	Haleakala	Pan-STARRS 1	·	2.1 km	MPC · JPL
560560	2015 HS_{4}	—	August 31, 2011	Haleakala	Pan-STARRS 1	·	3.9 km	MPC · JPL
560561	2015 HT_{5}	—	November 20, 2007	Kitt Peak	Spacewatch	·	2.8 km	MPC · JPL
560562	2015 HB_{8}	—	November 1, 2013	Mount Lemmon	Mount Lemmon Survey	·	2.5 km	MPC · JPL
560563	2015 HH_{10}	—	April 18, 2015	Cerro Tololo	DECam	APO +1km	850 m	MPC · JPL
560564	2015 HO_{11}	—	January 31, 2015	Haleakala	Pan-STARRS 1	·	1.9 km	MPC · JPL
560565	2015 HY_{11}	—	November 5, 2007	Mount Lemmon	Mount Lemmon Survey	VER	2.8 km	MPC · JPL
560566	2015 HF_{13}	—	March 21, 2015	Haleakala	Pan-STARRS 1	·	3.2 km	MPC · JPL
560567	2015 HJ_{13}	—	October 21, 2012	Mount Lemmon	Mount Lemmon Survey	·	3.1 km	MPC · JPL
560568	2015 HG_{14}	—	April 10, 2015	Kitt Peak	Spacewatch	·	2.2 km	MPC · JPL
560569	2015 HZ_{15}	—	December 25, 2014	Haleakala	Pan-STARRS 1	·	3.6 km	MPC · JPL
560570	2015 HD_{16}	—	September 14, 2013	Haleakala	Pan-STARRS 1	·	2.5 km	MPC · JPL
560571	2015 HE_{16}	—	October 26, 2013	Mount Lemmon	Mount Lemmon Survey	·	3.5 km	MPC · JPL
560572	2015 HH_{16}	—	November 1, 2013	Catalina	CSS	TIR	3.1 km	MPC · JPL
560573	2015 HJ_{16}	—	March 25, 2010	Kitt Peak	Spacewatch	TIR	2.6 km	MPC · JPL
560574	2015 HD_{17}	—	May 4, 2010	Kitt Peak	Spacewatch	·	2.2 km	MPC · JPL
560575	2015 HX_{18}	—	March 21, 2015	Mount Lemmon	Mount Lemmon Survey	·	2.8 km	MPC · JPL
560576	2015 HO_{19}	—	November 19, 1995	Kitt Peak	Spacewatch	EOS	2.0 km	MPC · JPL
560577	2015 HM_{22}	—	March 21, 2015	Haleakala	Pan-STARRS 1	·	2.0 km	MPC · JPL
560578	2015 HP_{22}	—	October 21, 2006	Mount Lemmon	Mount Lemmon Survey	·	2.8 km	MPC · JPL
560579	2015 HQ_{23}	—	October 21, 2006	Mount Lemmon	Mount Lemmon Survey	·	2.6 km	MPC · JPL
560580	2015 HB_{25}	—	March 16, 2015	Mount Lemmon	Mount Lemmon Survey	·	2.6 km	MPC · JPL
560581	2015 HC_{26}	—	October 23, 2006	Kitt Peak	Spacewatch	·	2.9 km	MPC · JPL
560582	2015 HE_{28}	—	October 18, 2012	Haleakala	Pan-STARRS 1	VER	2.5 km	MPC · JPL
560583	2015 HJ_{28}	—	August 18, 2006	Palomar	NEAT	·	1.9 km	MPC · JPL
560584	2015 HC_{30}	—	November 5, 2007	Mount Lemmon	Mount Lemmon Survey	(3460)	1.7 km	MPC · JPL
560585	2015 HL_{30}	—	February 20, 2009	Kitt Peak	Spacewatch	·	2.4 km	MPC · JPL
560586	2015 HF_{31}	—	March 21, 2015	Haleakala	Pan-STARRS 1	·	2.4 km	MPC · JPL
560587	2015 HR_{32}	—	January 1, 2008	Kitt Peak	Spacewatch	·	2.7 km	MPC · JPL
560588	2015 HB_{34}	—	August 21, 2006	Kitt Peak	Spacewatch	·	2.9 km	MPC · JPL
560589	2015 HY_{34}	—	November 7, 2007	Kitt Peak	Spacewatch	·	2.9 km	MPC · JPL
560590	2015 HC_{35}	—	March 17, 2015	Haleakala	Pan-STARRS 1	·	2.6 km	MPC · JPL
560591	2015 HQ_{35}	—	November 14, 2012	Kitt Peak	Spacewatch	·	2.8 km	MPC · JPL
560592	2015 HM_{36}	—	October 21, 2012	Mount Lemmon	Mount Lemmon Survey	·	3.5 km	MPC · JPL
560593	2015 HA_{37}	—	December 8, 2012	Mount Lemmon	Mount Lemmon Survey	·	3.0 km	MPC · JPL
560594	2015 HL_{37}	—	November 16, 1995	Kitt Peak	Spacewatch	·	3.0 km	MPC · JPL
560595	2015 HU_{37}	—	October 23, 2006	Mount Lemmon	Mount Lemmon Survey	(7605)	2.8 km	MPC · JPL
560596	2015 HW_{37}	—	January 15, 2008	Kitt Peak	Spacewatch	·	3.1 km	MPC · JPL
560597	2015 HY_{37}	—	January 30, 2015	Haleakala	Pan-STARRS 1	TIR	2.2 km	MPC · JPL
560598	2015 HR_{38}	—	May 23, 2004	Kitt Peak	Spacewatch	·	2.9 km	MPC · JPL
560599	2015 HU_{39}	—	December 21, 2003	Kitt Peak	Spacewatch	·	1 km	MPC · JPL
560600	2015 HD_{45}	—	October 20, 2012	Haleakala	Pan-STARRS 1	·	2.6 km	MPC · JPL

== 560601–560700 ==
back to top

Designation			Discovery			Properties		Ref
Permanent	Provisional	Named after	Date	Site	Discoverer(s)	Category	Diam.	Ref
560601	2015 HN_{45}	—	March 27, 2015	Haleakala	Pan-STARRS 1	·	1.8 km	MPC · JPL
560602	2015 HS_{45}	—	November 9, 2007	Kitt Peak	Spacewatch	EOS	1.8 km	MPC · JPL
560603	2015 HB_{46}	—	November 8, 2013	Mount Lemmon	Mount Lemmon Survey	VER	2.6 km	MPC · JPL
560604	2015 HR_{48}	—	November 8, 2007	Kitt Peak	Spacewatch	EOS	1.6 km	MPC · JPL
560605	2015 HW_{48}	—	June 15, 2010	Mount Lemmon	Mount Lemmon Survey	·	3.7 km	MPC · JPL
560606	2015 HJ_{49}	—	December 2, 2012	Mount Lemmon	Mount Lemmon Survey	·	3.0 km	MPC · JPL
560607	2015 HN_{49}	—	March 27, 2015	Haleakala	Pan-STARRS 1	·	3.0 km	MPC · JPL
560608	2015 HB_{50}	—	May 23, 2006	Kitt Peak	Spacewatch	DOR	1.7 km	MPC · JPL
560609	2015 HF_{50}	—	February 16, 2015	Haleakala	Pan-STARRS 1	EOS	1.9 km	MPC · JPL
560610	2015 HQ_{50}	—	February 16, 2015	Haleakala	Pan-STARRS 1	·	2.2 km	MPC · JPL
560611	2015 HX_{52}	—	October 8, 2012	Haleakala	Pan-STARRS 1	·	3.0 km	MPC · JPL
560612	2015 HF_{53}	—	March 21, 2015	Haleakala	Pan-STARRS 1	·	2.7 km	MPC · JPL
560613	2015 HL_{53}	—	January 3, 2009	Mount Lemmon	Mount Lemmon Survey	·	2.5 km	MPC · JPL
560614	2015 HV_{53}	—	January 10, 2008	Kitt Peak	Spacewatch	·	3.9 km	MPC · JPL
560615	2015 HF_{54}	—	November 4, 2007	Kitt Peak	Spacewatch	·	2.7 km	MPC · JPL
560616	2015 HH_{54}	—	December 29, 2008	Mount Lemmon	Mount Lemmon Survey	·	2.6 km	MPC · JPL
560617	2015 HP_{54}	—	September 17, 2012	Mount Lemmon	Mount Lemmon Survey	·	2.5 km	MPC · JPL
560618	2015 HC_{55}	—	October 26, 2013	Catalina	CSS	·	700 m	MPC · JPL
560619	2015 HF_{59}	—	September 19, 2003	Kitt Peak	Spacewatch	·	810 m	MPC · JPL
560620	2015 HE_{62}	—	May 5, 1997	Kitt Peak	Spacewatch	·	3.8 km	MPC · JPL
560621	2015 HS_{66}	—	November 14, 2010	Kitt Peak	Spacewatch	·	870 m	MPC · JPL
560622	2015 HQ_{68}	—	April 23, 2015	Haleakala	Pan-STARRS 1	·	2.3 km	MPC · JPL
560623	2015 HO_{70}	—	August 30, 2005	Kitt Peak	Spacewatch	THM	2.0 km	MPC · JPL
560624	2015 HC_{71}	—	August 14, 2012	Haleakala	Pan-STARRS 1	MAS	740 m	MPC · JPL
560625	2015 HC_{72}	—	March 23, 2015	Kitt Peak	Spacewatch	·	2.1 km	MPC · JPL
560626	2015 HJ_{75}	—	December 7, 2012	Nogales	M. Schwartz, P. R. Holvorcem	·	2.0 km	MPC · JPL
560627	2015 HS_{75}	—	April 2, 2006	Kitt Peak	Spacewatch	·	1.5 km	MPC · JPL
560628	2015 HT_{75}	—	September 17, 2006	Kitt Peak	Spacewatch	·	3.4 km	MPC · JPL
560629	2015 HM_{76}	—	November 12, 2012	Mount Lemmon	Mount Lemmon Survey	KOR	1.4 km	MPC · JPL
560630	2015 HP_{77}	—	February 19, 2009	Kitt Peak	Spacewatch	KOR	1.6 km	MPC · JPL
560631	2015 HL_{80}	—	August 30, 2005	Kitt Peak	Spacewatch	·	2.7 km	MPC · JPL
560632	2015 HP_{80}	—	January 4, 2014	Mount Lemmon	Mount Lemmon Survey	·	2.1 km	MPC · JPL
560633	2015 HJ_{81}	—	April 14, 2015	Mount Lemmon	Mount Lemmon Survey	·	1.4 km	MPC · JPL
560634	2015 HL_{81}	—	May 19, 2010	Mount Lemmon	Mount Lemmon Survey	·	1.3 km	MPC · JPL
560635	2015 HK_{83}	—	November 1, 2008	Mount Lemmon	Mount Lemmon Survey	PAD	1.3 km	MPC · JPL
560636	2015 HK_{85}	—	October 8, 2007	Mount Lemmon	Mount Lemmon Survey	·	2.8 km	MPC · JPL
560637	2015 HQ_{88}	—	August 27, 2011	Piszkéstető	K. Sárneczky	·	2.5 km	MPC · JPL
560638	2015 HD_{89}	—	October 11, 2012	Haleakala	Pan-STARRS 1	·	2.4 km	MPC · JPL
560639	2015 HZ_{89}	—	March 17, 2009	Kitt Peak	Spacewatch	THM	1.9 km	MPC · JPL
560640	2015 HV_{90}	—	February 22, 2009	Kitt Peak	Spacewatch	·	2.3 km	MPC · JPL
560641	2015 HD_{92}	—	October 8, 2012	Mount Lemmon	Mount Lemmon Survey	·	3.3 km	MPC · JPL
560642	2015 HN_{92}	—	August 8, 2005	Siding Spring	SSS	·	2.6 km	MPC · JPL
560643	2015 HG_{98}	—	December 29, 2013	Haleakala	Pan-STARRS 1	·	2.1 km	MPC · JPL
560644	2015 HQ_{98}	—	September 22, 2003	Anderson Mesa	LONEOS	·	570 m	MPC · JPL
560645	2015 HZ_{100}	—	March 19, 2015	Haleakala	Pan-STARRS 1	·	1.7 km	MPC · JPL
560646	2015 HV_{101}	—	January 1, 2014	Haleakala	Pan-STARRS 1	MRX	960 m	MPC · JPL
560647	2015 HF_{102}	—	July 30, 2005	Palomar	NEAT	·	540 m	MPC · JPL
560648	2015 HS_{103}	—	February 6, 2014	Mount Lemmon	Mount Lemmon Survey	·	3.1 km	MPC · JPL
560649	2015 HV_{103}	—	November 5, 2012	Kitt Peak	Spacewatch	·	3.2 km	MPC · JPL
560650	2015 HF_{104}	—	February 24, 2015	Haleakala	Pan-STARRS 1	·	2.5 km	MPC · JPL
560651	2015 HB_{105}	—	December 25, 2013	Kitt Peak	Spacewatch	EMA	3.0 km	MPC · JPL
560652	2015 HX_{105}	—	February 23, 2015	Haleakala	Pan-STARRS 1	·	2.1 km	MPC · JPL
560653	2015 HF_{106}	—	November 8, 2007	Mount Lemmon	Mount Lemmon Survey	(5651)	2.9 km	MPC · JPL
560654	2015 HG_{107}	—	August 6, 2011	Haleakala	Pan-STARRS 1	ARM	3.1 km	MPC · JPL
560655	2015 HO_{108}	—	January 31, 2008	Mount Lemmon	Mount Lemmon Survey	VER	2.8 km	MPC · JPL
560656	2015 HW_{109}	—	January 1, 2014	Haleakala	Pan-STARRS 1	·	2.5 km	MPC · JPL
560657	2015 HH_{110}	—	April 13, 2015	Haleakala	Pan-STARRS 1	URS	3.0 km	MPC · JPL
560658	2015 HM_{111}	—	January 26, 2014	Haleakala	Pan-STARRS 1	·	2.3 km	MPC · JPL
560659	2015 HQ_{111}	—	December 30, 2007	Mount Lemmon	Mount Lemmon Survey	·	3.3 km	MPC · JPL
560660	2015 HC_{112}	—	March 28, 2015	Haleakala	Pan-STARRS 1	·	1.7 km	MPC · JPL
560661	2015 HZ_{112}	—	April 2, 2009	Mount Lemmon	Mount Lemmon Survey	·	2.9 km	MPC · JPL
560662	2015 HE_{113}	—	March 15, 2009	Mount Lemmon	Mount Lemmon Survey	·	2.4 km	MPC · JPL
560663	2015 HG_{113}	—	January 24, 2014	Haleakala	Pan-STARRS 1	·	2.4 km	MPC · JPL
560664	2015 HN_{113}	—	January 12, 2008	Kitt Peak	Spacewatch	·	3.3 km	MPC · JPL
560665	2015 HW_{113}	—	March 21, 2015	Haleakala	Pan-STARRS 1	·	1.9 km	MPC · JPL
560666	2015 HB_{115}	—	April 1, 2003	Apache Point	SDSS Collaboration	·	4.1 km	MPC · JPL
560667	2015 HE_{115}	—	February 23, 2015	Haleakala	Pan-STARRS 1	·	2.6 km	MPC · JPL
560668	2015 HB_{116}	—	April 13, 2015	Haleakala	Pan-STARRS 1	·	2.0 km	MPC · JPL
560669	2015 HL_{116}	—	January 9, 2014	Mount Lemmon	Mount Lemmon Survey	·	2.7 km	MPC · JPL
560670	2015 HB_{119}	—	October 7, 2008	Mount Lemmon	Mount Lemmon Survey	HNS	1.0 km	MPC · JPL
560671	2015 HW_{119}	—	January 11, 2008	Kitt Peak	Spacewatch	·	2.4 km	MPC · JPL
560672	2015 HH_{120}	—	September 26, 2006	Mount Lemmon	Mount Lemmon Survey	·	2.6 km	MPC · JPL
560673	2015 HU_{120}	—	July 27, 2005	Palomar	NEAT	·	580 m	MPC · JPL
560674	2015 HS_{121}	—	April 13, 2008	Kitt Peak	Spacewatch	V	870 m	MPC · JPL
560675	2015 HA_{124}	—	November 13, 2007	Kitt Peak	Spacewatch	·	1.7 km	MPC · JPL
560676	2015 HV_{126}	—	November 13, 2012	Kitt Peak	Spacewatch	·	2.7 km	MPC · JPL
560677	2015 HL_{132}	—	November 9, 2013	Haleakala	Pan-STARRS 1	·	770 m	MPC · JPL
560678	2015 HP_{132}	—	May 8, 2010	Mount Lemmon	Mount Lemmon Survey	·	1.6 km	MPC · JPL
560679	2015 HS_{132}	—	September 24, 2008	Mount Lemmon	Mount Lemmon Survey	·	1.4 km	MPC · JPL
560680	2015 HO_{133}	—	November 16, 1999	Kitt Peak	Spacewatch	·	4.6 km	MPC · JPL
560681	2015 HE_{143}	—	November 26, 2013	Haleakala	Pan-STARRS 1	·	560 m	MPC · JPL
560682	2015 HH_{147}	—	April 12, 2011	Mount Lemmon	Mount Lemmon Survey	·	1.0 km	MPC · JPL
560683	2015 HK_{148}	—	January 24, 2014	Haleakala	Pan-STARRS 1	·	1.8 km	MPC · JPL
560684	2015 HZ_{156}	—	March 2, 2009	Kitt Peak	Spacewatch	VER	2.3 km	MPC · JPL
560685	2015 HX_{157}	—	November 20, 2006	Kitt Peak	Spacewatch	THM	2.5 km	MPC · JPL
560686	2015 HU_{158}	—	January 6, 2006	Mount Lemmon	Mount Lemmon Survey	·	870 m	MPC · JPL
560687	2015 HO_{160}	—	October 11, 2006	Palomar	NEAT	·	3.3 km	MPC · JPL
560688	2015 HP_{160}	—	March 26, 2015	Mount Lemmon	Mount Lemmon Survey	·	3.2 km	MPC · JPL
560689	2015 HQ_{161}	—	March 18, 2015	Haleakala	Pan-STARRS 1	·	2.3 km	MPC · JPL
560690	2015 HS_{161}	—	November 7, 2012	Haleakala	Pan-STARRS 1	·	2.1 km	MPC · JPL
560691	2015 HL_{165}	—	October 19, 2006	Kitt Peak	Spacewatch	·	2.7 km	MPC · JPL
560692	2015 HP_{166}	—	August 31, 2005	Palomar	NEAT	·	3.4 km	MPC · JPL
560693	2015 HV_{167}	—	April 24, 2015	Haleakala	Pan-STARRS 1	MAR	860 m	MPC · JPL
560694	2015 HN_{169}	—	April 3, 2008	Mount Lemmon	Mount Lemmon Survey	·	610 m	MPC · JPL
560695	2015 HF_{172}	—	October 30, 2007	Kitt Peak	Spacewatch	·	3.3 km	MPC · JPL
560696	2015 HG_{172}	—	January 28, 2015	Haleakala	Pan-STARRS 1	TIR	2.6 km	MPC · JPL
560697	2015 HM_{177}	—	April 13, 2004	Palomar	NEAT	TIR	3.2 km	MPC · JPL
560698	2015 HN_{179}	—	September 24, 2012	Kitt Peak	Spacewatch	·	3.7 km	MPC · JPL
560699	2015 HV_{179}	—	November 18, 2007	Mount Lemmon	Mount Lemmon Survey	TIR	2.3 km	MPC · JPL
560700	2015 HT_{180}	—	October 9, 2007	Kitt Peak	Spacewatch	TIR	2.7 km	MPC · JPL

== 560701–560800 ==
back to top

Designation			Discovery			Properties		Ref
Permanent	Provisional	Named after	Date	Site	Discoverer(s)	Category	Diam.	Ref
560701	2015 HL_{185}	—	January 6, 2008	Mauna Kea	P. A. Wiegert, A. M. Gilbert	THM	2.5 km	MPC · JPL
560702	2015 HK_{191}	—	October 23, 2012	Kitt Peak	Spacewatch	·	2.8 km	MPC · JPL
560703	2015 HX_{192}	—	January 24, 2014	Haleakala	Pan-STARRS 1	HYG	2.1 km	MPC · JPL
560704	2015 HA_{193}	—	September 18, 2001	Apache Point	SDSS Collaboration	EOS	1.5 km	MPC · JPL
560705	2015 HP_{193}	—	April 25, 2015	Haleakala	Pan-STARRS 1	·	2.0 km	MPC · JPL
560706	2015 HU_{194}	—	January 11, 2014	Kitt Peak	Spacewatch	·	2.4 km	MPC · JPL
560707	2015 HH_{200}	—	April 30, 2015	Mount Lemmon	Mount Lemmon Survey	T_{j} (2.99)	3.1 km	MPC · JPL
560708	2015 HC_{201}	—	July 14, 2016	Haleakala	Pan-STARRS 1	·	1.7 km	MPC · JPL
560709	2015 HC_{209}	—	April 23, 2015	Haleakala	Pan-STARRS 1	HYG	2.4 km	MPC · JPL
560710	2015 HP_{210}	—	April 20, 2015	Haleakala	Pan-STARRS 1	HYG	2.3 km	MPC · JPL
560711	2015 HH_{215}	—	April 23, 2015	Haleakala	Pan-STARRS 1	·	1.4 km	MPC · JPL
560712	2015 HT_{215}	—	April 18, 2015	Mount Lemmon	Mount Lemmon Survey	·	2.3 km	MPC · JPL
560713	2015 HB_{217}	—	April 18, 2015	Mount Lemmon	Mount Lemmon Survey	L4	7.4 km	MPC · JPL
560714	2015 JX_{2}	—	April 10, 2002	Socorro	LINEAR	·	690 m	MPC · JPL
560715	2015 JS_{3}	—	May 15, 2015	Haleakala	Pan-STARRS 1	·	1.2 km	MPC · JPL
560716	2015 JS_{8}	—	January 28, 2015	Haleakala	Pan-STARRS 1	·	2.9 km	MPC · JPL
560717	2015 JH_{10}	—	December 14, 2006	Kitt Peak	Spacewatch	·	800 m	MPC · JPL
560718	2015 JK_{14}	—	May 14, 2015	Cerro Paranal	Altmann, M., Prusti, T.	WIT	810 m	MPC · JPL
560719	2015 JH_{16}	—	May 14, 2015	Haleakala	Pan-STARRS 1	·	2.9 km	MPC · JPL
560720	2015 KH_{1}	—	October 15, 2007	Mount Lemmon	Mount Lemmon Survey	TIR	2.7 km	MPC · JPL
560721	2015 KM_{1}	—	January 28, 2015	Haleakala	Pan-STARRS 1	·	2.8 km	MPC · JPL
560722	2015 KZ_{1}	—	October 22, 2012	Haleakala	Pan-STARRS 1	·	2.8 km	MPC · JPL
560723	2015 KN_{4}	—	January 4, 2011	Mount Lemmon	Mount Lemmon Survey	·	1.2 km	MPC · JPL
560724	2015 KH_{5}	—	December 31, 2013	Haleakala	Pan-STARRS 1	·	2.9 km	MPC · JPL
560725	2015 KS_{5}	—	October 31, 2013	Kitt Peak	Spacewatch	·	2.3 km	MPC · JPL
560726	2015 KB_{7}	—	August 26, 2005	Palomar	NEAT	·	3.4 km	MPC · JPL
560727	2015 KK_{7}	—	September 25, 2011	Haleakala	Pan-STARRS 1	EOS	1.8 km	MPC · JPL
560728	2015 KJ_{10}	—	October 11, 2006	Palomar	NEAT	·	2.7 km	MPC · JPL
560729	2015 KO_{10}	—	September 30, 2006	Kitt Peak	Spacewatch	·	2.6 km	MPC · JPL
560730	2015 KK_{20}	—	October 24, 2003	Kitt Peak	Spacewatch	·	920 m	MPC · JPL
560731	2015 KG_{21}	—	February 26, 2004	Kitt Peak	Deep Ecliptic Survey	·	620 m	MPC · JPL
560732	2015 KQ_{23}	—	July 25, 2006	Palomar	NEAT	·	890 m	MPC · JPL
560733	2015 KS_{28}	—	January 10, 2007	Mount Lemmon	Mount Lemmon Survey	·	1.3 km	MPC · JPL
560734	2015 KR_{29}	—	November 13, 2006	Kitt Peak	Spacewatch	·	850 m	MPC · JPL
560735	2015 KV_{30}	—	October 31, 2006	Mount Lemmon	Mount Lemmon Survey	·	3.1 km	MPC · JPL
560736	2015 KL_{31}	—	April 28, 2015	Cerro Paranal	Altmann, M., Prusti, T.	·	1.2 km	MPC · JPL
560737	2015 KZ_{31}	—	May 10, 2015	Mount Lemmon	Mount Lemmon Survey	HYG	2.4 km	MPC · JPL
560738	2015 KN_{32}	—	March 30, 2015	Haleakala	Pan-STARRS 1	·	2.5 km	MPC · JPL
560739	2015 KD_{38}	—	August 30, 2005	Palomar	NEAT	·	2.5 km	MPC · JPL
560740	2015 KO_{38}	—	October 16, 2006	Catalina	CSS	·	710 m	MPC · JPL
560741	2015 KD_{43}	—	October 8, 2012	Kitt Peak	Spacewatch	·	800 m	MPC · JPL
560742	2015 KK_{43}	—	May 20, 2015	Haleakala	Pan-STARRS 1	·	2.4 km	MPC · JPL
560743	2015 KA_{44}	—	May 20, 2015	Haleakala	Pan-STARRS 1	·	720 m	MPC · JPL
560744	2015 KZ_{44}	—	May 20, 2015	Haleakala	Pan-STARRS 1	·	640 m	MPC · JPL
560745	2015 KB_{48}	—	April 22, 2009	Mount Lemmon	Mount Lemmon Survey	·	2.8 km	MPC · JPL
560746	2015 KA_{49}	—	April 4, 2011	Kitt Peak	Spacewatch	·	990 m	MPC · JPL
560747	2015 KB_{49}	—	May 20, 2015	Haleakala	Pan-STARRS 1	·	790 m	MPC · JPL
560748	2015 KD_{54}	—	April 30, 2009	Kitt Peak	Spacewatch	·	2.4 km	MPC · JPL
560749	2015 KZ_{54}	—	January 10, 2008	Kitt Peak	Spacewatch	·	540 m	MPC · JPL
560750	2015 KU_{56}	—	October 29, 2003	Kitt Peak	Spacewatch	·	690 m	MPC · JPL
560751	2015 KD_{58}	—	November 11, 2013	Kitt Peak	Spacewatch	·	740 m	MPC · JPL
560752	2015 KB_{60}	—	February 9, 2008	Kitt Peak	Spacewatch	·	4.9 km	MPC · JPL
560753	2015 KM_{62}	—	September 25, 2011	Haleakala	Pan-STARRS 1	·	2.5 km	MPC · JPL
560754	2015 KO_{65}	—	April 25, 2015	Haleakala	Pan-STARRS 1	·	1.8 km	MPC · JPL
560755	2015 KQ_{66}	—	January 30, 2011	Mount Lemmon	Mount Lemmon Survey	·	560 m	MPC · JPL
560756	2015 KE_{67}	—	April 28, 2011	Kitt Peak	Spacewatch	·	980 m	MPC · JPL
560757	2015 KY_{67}	—	May 11, 2015	Mount Lemmon	Mount Lemmon Survey	·	2.5 km	MPC · JPL
560758	2015 KW_{74}	—	April 25, 2015	Haleakala	Pan-STARRS 1	·	1.7 km	MPC · JPL
560759	2015 KG_{75}	—	March 30, 2015	Haleakala	Pan-STARRS 1	·	2.9 km	MPC · JPL
560760	2015 KB_{80}	—	May 21, 2015	Haleakala	Pan-STARRS 1	·	1.4 km	MPC · JPL
560761	2015 KK_{81}	—	February 22, 2014	Mount Lemmon	Mount Lemmon Survey	·	2.2 km	MPC · JPL
560762	2015 KF_{84}	—	April 14, 2015	Kitt Peak	Spacewatch	·	4.0 km	MPC · JPL
560763	2015 KH_{85}	—	April 24, 2003	Kitt Peak	Spacewatch	URS	2.8 km	MPC · JPL
560764	2015 KF_{86}	—	May 21, 2015	Haleakala	Pan-STARRS 1	·	2.7 km	MPC · JPL
560765	2015 KY_{87}	—	March 30, 2015	Haleakala	Pan-STARRS 1	·	2.6 km	MPC · JPL
560766	2015 KA_{88}	—	April 1, 2003	Apache Point	SDSS Collaboration	·	3.3 km	MPC · JPL
560767	2015 KZ_{95}	—	September 28, 2009	Mount Lemmon	Mount Lemmon Survey	·	620 m	MPC · JPL
560768	2015 KS_{99}	—	March 30, 2015	Haleakala	Pan-STARRS 1	·	820 m	MPC · JPL
560769	2015 KM_{107}	—	May 11, 2008	Kitt Peak	Spacewatch	V	380 m	MPC · JPL
560770	2015 KT_{116}	—	April 1, 2008	Mount Lemmon	Mount Lemmon Survey	·	630 m	MPC · JPL
560771	2015 KD_{119}	—	April 18, 2015	Haleakala	Pan-STARRS 1	·	2.0 km	MPC · JPL
560772	2015 KR_{123}	—	July 6, 2005	Kitt Peak	Spacewatch	·	2.5 km	MPC · JPL
560773	2015 KB_{124}	—	August 26, 2012	Haleakala	Pan-STARRS 1	MAS	540 m	MPC · JPL
560774	2015 KF_{124}	—	June 23, 2009	Mount Lemmon	Mount Lemmon Survey	·	720 m	MPC · JPL
560775	2015 KG_{124}	—	September 23, 2008	Kitt Peak	Spacewatch	·	890 m	MPC · JPL
560776	2015 KO_{124}	—	April 30, 2011	Mount Lemmon	Mount Lemmon Survey	·	850 m	MPC · JPL
560777	2015 KY_{126}	—	May 19, 2015	Mount Lemmon	Mount Lemmon Survey	·	2.8 km	MPC · JPL
560778	2015 KF_{127}	—	April 25, 2015	Haleakala	Pan-STARRS 1	·	600 m	MPC · JPL
560779	2015 KE_{128}	—	April 25, 2015	Haleakala	Pan-STARRS 1	·	2.0 km	MPC · JPL
560780	2015 KL_{128}	—	June 21, 2009	Kitt Peak	Spacewatch	·	550 m	MPC · JPL
560781	2015 KQ_{128}	—	June 5, 2011	Kitt Peak	Spacewatch	·	900 m	MPC · JPL
560782	2015 KQ_{130}	—	May 13, 2015	Mount Lemmon	Mount Lemmon Survey	V	500 m	MPC · JPL
560783	2015 KE_{131}	—	February 12, 2008	Kitt Peak	Spacewatch	·	870 m	MPC · JPL
560784	2015 KK_{131}	—	March 29, 2008	Catalina	CSS	·	650 m	MPC · JPL
560785	2015 KN_{131}	—	October 20, 2012	Haleakala	Pan-STARRS 1	PHO	690 m	MPC · JPL
560786	2015 KW_{131}	—	October 27, 2009	Kitt Peak	Spacewatch	V	560 m	MPC · JPL
560787	2015 KV_{132}	—	September 11, 2002	Haleakala	NEAT	·	610 m	MPC · JPL
560788	2015 KW_{134}	—	December 8, 2010	Mount Lemmon	Mount Lemmon Survey	·	670 m	MPC · JPL
560789	2015 KD_{135}	—	March 23, 2006	Kitt Peak	Spacewatch	·	1.2 km	MPC · JPL
560790	2015 KS_{135}	—	October 18, 2003	Kitt Peak	Spacewatch	MIS	2.4 km	MPC · JPL
560791	2015 KD_{137}	—	March 11, 2002	Palomar	NEAT	·	920 m	MPC · JPL
560792	2015 KZ_{138}	—	March 21, 2015	Haleakala	Pan-STARRS 1	·	1.3 km	MPC · JPL
560793	2015 KW_{139}	—	September 25, 2005	Kitt Peak	Spacewatch	·	680 m	MPC · JPL
560794 Ugoboncompagni	2015 KB_{143}	Ugoboncompagni	November 23, 2012	Mount Graham	K. Černis, R. P. Boyle	·	2.4 km	MPC · JPL
560795	2015 KK_{143}	—	May 24, 2015	Haleakala	Pan-STARRS 1	·	2.1 km	MPC · JPL
560796	2015 KC_{144}	—	August 18, 2006	Kitt Peak	Spacewatch	·	680 m	MPC · JPL
560797	2015 KE_{144}	—	December 19, 2004	Mount Lemmon	Mount Lemmon Survey	·	900 m	MPC · JPL
560798	2015 KO_{144}	—	September 29, 2011	Mount Lemmon	Mount Lemmon Survey	EOS	1.6 km	MPC · JPL
560799	2015 KH_{145}	—	April 26, 2008	Mount Lemmon	Mount Lemmon Survey	(2076)	810 m	MPC · JPL
560800	2015 KJ_{149}	—	January 28, 2014	Mount Lemmon	Mount Lemmon Survey	·	3.5 km	MPC · JPL

== 560801–560900 ==
back to top

Designation			Discovery			Properties		Ref
Permanent	Provisional	Named after	Date	Site	Discoverer(s)	Category	Diam.	Ref
560801	2015 KL_{149}	—	December 19, 2007	Mount Lemmon	Mount Lemmon Survey	·	3.6 km	MPC · JPL
560802	2015 KS_{149}	—	November 27, 2010	Mount Lemmon	Mount Lemmon Survey	L4	7.8 km	MPC · JPL
560803	2015 KH_{151}	—	January 25, 2014	Haleakala	Pan-STARRS 1	·	1.9 km	MPC · JPL
560804	2015 KO_{151}	—	October 15, 2012	Haleakala	Pan-STARRS 1	·	990 m	MPC · JPL
560805	2015 KJ_{152}	—	December 28, 2005	Mount Lemmon	Mount Lemmon Survey	EUN	1.3 km	MPC · JPL
560806	2015 KB_{154}	—	May 21, 2015	Haleakala	Pan-STARRS 1	·	1.9 km	MPC · JPL
560807	2015 KY_{155}	—	May 25, 2015	Haleakala	Pan-STARRS 1	PHO	660 m	MPC · JPL
560808	2015 KA_{160}	—	March 18, 2015	Haleakala	Pan-STARRS 1	BAR	960 m	MPC · JPL
560809	2015 KW_{164}	—	May 21, 2015	Haleakala	Pan-STARRS 2	·	1.0 km	MPC · JPL
560810	2015 KS_{165}	—	May 21, 2015	Haleakala	Pan-STARRS 1	·	930 m	MPC · JPL
560811	2015 KO_{169}	—	October 23, 2012	Haleakala	Pan-STARRS 1	HNS	980 m	MPC · JPL
560812	2015 KD_{171}	—	May 22, 2015	Haleakala	Pan-STARRS 1	MAR	610 m	MPC · JPL
560813	2015 KG_{171}	—	May 25, 2015	Haleakala	Pan-STARRS 1	EOS	1.2 km	MPC · JPL
560814	2015 KK_{172}	—	January 31, 2008	Mount Lemmon	Mount Lemmon Survey	·	650 m	MPC · JPL
560815	2015 KM_{172}	—	May 24, 2015	Haleakala	Pan-STARRS 1	·	810 m	MPC · JPL
560816	2015 KU_{172}	—	January 13, 2008	Kitt Peak	Spacewatch	·	940 m	MPC · JPL
560817	2015 KD_{180}	—	May 21, 2015	Haleakala	Pan-STARRS 1	·	590 m	MPC · JPL
560818	2015 KZ_{182}	—	May 22, 2015	Haleakala	Pan-STARRS 1	V	520 m	MPC · JPL
560819	2015 KA_{183}	—	May 25, 2015	Haleakala	Pan-STARRS 1	·	900 m	MPC · JPL
560820	2015 KE_{190}	—	May 21, 2015	Haleakala	Pan-STARRS 1	·	1.2 km	MPC · JPL
560821	2015 KP_{190}	—	October 17, 2012	Mount Lemmon	Mount Lemmon Survey	·	1.3 km	MPC · JPL
560822	2015 KT_{196}	—	May 21, 2015	Haleakala	Pan-STARRS 1	·	870 m	MPC · JPL
560823	2015 LA_{3}	—	August 20, 2006	Palomar	NEAT	·	4.3 km	MPC · JPL
560824	2015 LN_{4}	—	February 24, 2015	Haleakala	Pan-STARRS 1	·	600 m	MPC · JPL
560825	2015 LK_{8}	—	March 24, 2009	Mount Lemmon	Mount Lemmon Survey	·	2.9 km	MPC · JPL
560826	2015 LJ_{13}	—	May 13, 2009	Kitt Peak	Spacewatch	·	2.6 km	MPC · JPL
560827	2015 LA_{16}	—	May 2, 1998	Kitt Peak	Spacewatch	·	3.4 km	MPC · JPL
560828	2015 LE_{17}	—	May 4, 2009	Mount Lemmon	Mount Lemmon Survey	·	3.1 km	MPC · JPL
560829	2015 LN_{17}	—	December 28, 2005	Palomar	NEAT	TIR	2.8 km	MPC · JPL
560830	2015 LQ_{17}	—	January 3, 2013	Mount Lemmon	Mount Lemmon Survey	·	3.1 km	MPC · JPL
560831	2015 LP_{24}	—	August 28, 2006	Anderson Mesa	LONEOS	·	1.0 km	MPC · JPL
560832	2015 LP_{27}	—	March 14, 2008	Mount Lemmon	Mount Lemmon Survey	·	490 m	MPC · JPL
560833	2015 LU_{30}	—	October 15, 2012	Kitt Peak	Spacewatch	·	730 m	MPC · JPL
560834	2015 LG_{33}	—	October 16, 2012	Kitt Peak	Spacewatch	·	500 m	MPC · JPL
560835	2015 LU_{33}	—	July 28, 2005	Palomar	NEAT	·	770 m	MPC · JPL
560836	2015 LW_{33}	—	June 13, 2015	Haleakala	Pan-STARRS 1	NYS	750 m	MPC · JPL
560837	2015 LD_{34}	—	June 13, 2015	Haleakala	Pan-STARRS 1	·	1.2 km	MPC · JPL
560838	2015 LJ_{35}	—	December 29, 2008	Mount Lemmon	Mount Lemmon Survey	·	3.7 km	MPC · JPL
560839	2015 LV_{35}	—	June 14, 2015	Mount Lemmon	Mount Lemmon Survey	EUN	950 m	MPC · JPL
560840	2015 LW_{43}	—	June 10, 2015	Haleakala	Pan-STARRS 1	·	2.3 km	MPC · JPL
560841	2015 LP_{44}	—	June 15, 2015	Haleakala	Pan-STARRS 1	·	2.5 km	MPC · JPL
560842	2015 LX_{52}	—	June 15, 2015	Haleakala	Pan-STARRS 1	·	1.2 km	MPC · JPL
560843	2015 LV_{54}	—	June 7, 2015	Haleakala	Pan-STARRS 1	·	1.2 km	MPC · JPL
560844	2015 ME	—	November 21, 2003	Kitt Peak	Spacewatch	·	670 m	MPC · JPL
560845	2015 MB_{2}	—	December 27, 2006	Kitt Peak	Spacewatch	·	3.1 km	MPC · JPL
560846	2015 MU_{9}	—	October 18, 2012	Mount Lemmon	Mount Lemmon Survey	·	900 m	MPC · JPL
560847	2015 MU_{11}	—	August 13, 2002	Palomar	NEAT	·	640 m	MPC · JPL
560848	2015 MN_{12}	—	March 28, 2001	Kitt Peak	Spacewatch	·	800 m	MPC · JPL
560849	2015 MD_{20}	—	August 25, 2012	Kitt Peak	Spacewatch	·	1.1 km	MPC · JPL
560850	2015 ME_{21}	—	October 21, 2006	Mount Lemmon	Mount Lemmon Survey	·	2.9 km	MPC · JPL
560851	2015 MW_{22}	—	November 17, 1999	Kitt Peak	Spacewatch	·	3.7 km	MPC · JPL
560852	2015 MT_{25}	—	October 21, 2006	Mount Lemmon	Mount Lemmon Survey	·	2.4 km	MPC · JPL
560853	2015 MU_{26}	—	September 28, 2006	Catalina	CSS	EOS	2.1 km	MPC · JPL
560854	2015 MR_{27}	—	November 17, 2006	Kitt Peak	Spacewatch	·	580 m	MPC · JPL
560855	2015 MZ_{27}	—	March 22, 2015	Haleakala	Pan-STARRS 1	·	920 m	MPC · JPL
560856	2015 MW_{31}	—	May 22, 2015	Haleakala	Pan-STARRS 1	·	2.6 km	MPC · JPL
560857	2015 MM_{35}	—	February 1, 2008	Kitt Peak	Spacewatch	·	730 m	MPC · JPL
560858	2015 MB_{41}	—	December 11, 2013	Haleakala	Pan-STARRS 1	MAR	1.1 km	MPC · JPL
560859	2015 MU_{44}	—	April 14, 2008	Kitt Peak	Spacewatch	·	630 m	MPC · JPL
560860	2015 MA_{46}	—	November 11, 2009	Mount Lemmon	Mount Lemmon Survey	·	780 m	MPC · JPL
560861	2015 MR_{46}	—	February 14, 2007	Mauna Kea	P. A. Wiegert	·	790 m	MPC · JPL
560862	2015 MZ_{46}	—	November 10, 2005	Catalina	CSS	·	670 m	MPC · JPL
560863	2015 MP_{47}	—	June 17, 2015	Haleakala	Pan-STARRS 1	·	700 m	MPC · JPL
560864	2015 MM_{50}	—	June 17, 2015	Haleakala	Pan-STARRS 1	·	1.2 km	MPC · JPL
560865	2015 MT_{51}	—	May 24, 2011	Haleakala	Pan-STARRS 1	·	870 m	MPC · JPL
560866	2015 MZ_{51}	—	May 20, 2015	Haleakala	Pan-STARRS 1	TIR	2.2 km	MPC · JPL
560867	2015 MR_{53}	—	December 13, 2002	Haleakala	NEAT	PHO	1.1 km	MPC · JPL
560868	2015 MO_{54}	—	August 5, 2005	Palomar	NEAT	·	3.4 km	MPC · JPL
560869	2015 MD_{57}	—	September 26, 2005	Palomar	NEAT	V	680 m	MPC · JPL
560870	2015 MK_{57}	—	November 17, 2009	Mount Lemmon	Mount Lemmon Survey	·	560 m	MPC · JPL
560871	2015 ML_{62}	—	June 20, 2015	Haleakala	Pan-STARRS 1	PHO	1.2 km	MPC · JPL
560872	2015 MR_{62}	—	March 28, 2008	Kitt Peak	Spacewatch	·	520 m	MPC · JPL
560873	2015 MD_{64}	—	February 28, 2014	Haleakala	Pan-STARRS 1	V	630 m	MPC · JPL
560874	2015 MO_{64}	—	October 20, 2006	Kitt Peak	Spacewatch	·	540 m	MPC · JPL
560875	2015 MY_{64}	—	January 28, 2004	Kitt Peak	Spacewatch	·	640 m	MPC · JPL
560876	2015 MJ_{65}	—	January 25, 2014	Haleakala	Pan-STARRS 1	·	650 m	MPC · JPL
560877	2015 MX_{65}	—	July 15, 2005	Kitt Peak	Spacewatch	·	610 m	MPC · JPL
560878	2015 MM_{67}	—	April 22, 2009	Siding Spring	SSS	·	3.8 km	MPC · JPL
560879	2015 MK_{68}	—	September 20, 2012	Mayhill-ISON	L. Elenin	·	680 m	MPC · JPL
560880	2015 MF_{69}	—	August 26, 2012	Kitt Peak	Spacewatch	V	600 m	MPC · JPL
560881	2015 ML_{71}	—	October 13, 2002	Kitt Peak	Spacewatch	·	980 m	MPC · JPL
560882	2015 MU_{73}	—	December 24, 2013	Mount Lemmon	Mount Lemmon Survey	·	660 m	MPC · JPL
560883	2015 MU_{74}	—	August 26, 2012	Haleakala	Pan-STARRS 1	·	610 m	MPC · JPL
560884	2015 MF_{77}	—	November 10, 2009	Kitt Peak	Spacewatch	·	750 m	MPC · JPL
560885	2015 MG_{79}	—	December 20, 2009	Kitt Peak	Spacewatch	V	560 m	MPC · JPL
560886	2015 MY_{81}	—	April 13, 2011	Haleakala	Pan-STARRS 1	·	800 m	MPC · JPL
560887	2015 MQ_{90}	—	October 30, 2005	Mount Lemmon	Mount Lemmon Survey	·	990 m	MPC · JPL
560888	2015 ME_{93}	—	May 25, 2015	Haleakala	Pan-STARRS 1	TIR	2.6 km	MPC · JPL
560889	2015 MX_{93}	—	February 22, 2003	Kleť	J. Tichá, M. Tichý	·	3.4 km	MPC · JPL
560890	2015 MQ_{94}	—	April 6, 2005	Mount Lemmon	Mount Lemmon Survey	·	600 m	MPC · JPL
560891	2015 MG_{97}	—	November 24, 2009	Kitt Peak	Spacewatch	·	670 m	MPC · JPL
560892	2015 MX_{99}	—	March 11, 2008	Kitt Peak	Spacewatch	·	570 m	MPC · JPL
560893	2015 MC_{106}	—	September 17, 2010	Mount Lemmon	Mount Lemmon Survey	·	2.5 km	MPC · JPL
560894	2015 ME_{106}	—	April 30, 2015	La Palma	La Palma	(1338) (FLO)	580 m	MPC · JPL
560895	2015 MA_{109}	—	December 8, 2005	Kitt Peak	Spacewatch	·	2.9 km	MPC · JPL
560896	2015 ML_{109}	—	October 18, 2012	Mount Lemmon	Mount Lemmon Survey	V	570 m	MPC · JPL
560897	2015 MU_{109}	—	February 28, 2008	Mount Lemmon	Mount Lemmon Survey	·	520 m	MPC · JPL
560898	2015 MF_{111}	—	June 26, 2015	Haleakala	Pan-STARRS 1	·	590 m	MPC · JPL
560899	2015 MO_{111}	—	June 13, 2015	Haleakala	Pan-STARRS 1	·	710 m	MPC · JPL
560900	2015 MX_{116}	—	July 28, 2001	Anderson Mesa	LONEOS	·	1.0 km	MPC · JPL

== 560901–561000 ==
back to top

Designation			Discovery			Properties		Ref
Permanent	Provisional	Named after	Date	Site	Discoverer(s)	Category	Diam.	Ref
560901	2015 MT_{122}	—	October 28, 2005	Kitt Peak	Spacewatch	·	720 m	MPC · JPL
560902	2015 MP_{124}	—	April 11, 2008	Kitt Peak	Spacewatch	·	580 m	MPC · JPL
560903	2015 MP_{125}	—	October 26, 2002	Haleakala	NEAT	·	730 m	MPC · JPL
560904	2015 MO_{129}	—	August 31, 2005	Palomar	NEAT	·	830 m	MPC · JPL
560905	2015 ML_{135}	—	May 3, 2011	Kitt Peak	Spacewatch	V	490 m	MPC · JPL
560906	2015 MB_{139}	—	October 2, 2008	Mount Lemmon	Mount Lemmon Survey	·	1.3 km	MPC · JPL
560907	2015 MO_{139}	—	August 26, 2012	Haleakala	Pan-STARRS 1	·	510 m	MPC · JPL
560908	2015 MM_{141}	—	October 10, 2012	Kitt Peak	Spacewatch	V	540 m	MPC · JPL
560909	2015 MC_{147}	—	February 14, 2010	Kitt Peak	Spacewatch	·	1.1 km	MPC · JPL
560910	2015 MD_{148}	—	October 17, 2012	Mount Lemmon	Mount Lemmon Survey	·	630 m	MPC · JPL
560911	2015 MU_{148}	—	August 25, 2004	Kitt Peak	Spacewatch	·	900 m	MPC · JPL
560912	2015 MY_{148}	—	February 28, 2006	Mount Lemmon	Mount Lemmon Survey	·	1.1 km	MPC · JPL
560913	2015 MJ_{150}	—	June 24, 2015	Haleakala	Pan-STARRS 1	·	1.3 km	MPC · JPL
560914	2015 MP_{150}	—	June 14, 2015	Mount Lemmon	Mount Lemmon Survey	HNS	1.1 km	MPC · JPL
560915	2015 MN_{164}	—	June 17, 2015	Haleakala	Pan-STARRS 1	·	880 m	MPC · JPL
560916	2015 ML_{165}	—	June 18, 2015	Haleakala	Pan-STARRS 1	EOS	1.4 km	MPC · JPL
560917	2015 MY_{167}	—	June 19, 2015	Haleakala	Pan-STARRS 1	V	540 m	MPC · JPL
560918	2015 MU_{171}	—	June 27, 2015	Haleakala	Pan-STARRS 1	·	1.5 km	MPC · JPL
560919	2015 MH_{172}	—	June 19, 2015	Haleakala	Pan-STARRS 1	·	2.7 km	MPC · JPL
560920	2015 MT_{175}	—	June 22, 2015	Haleakala	Pan-STARRS 1	EUN	990 m	MPC · JPL
560921	2015 MU_{175}	—	June 26, 2015	Haleakala	Pan-STARRS 1	·	930 m	MPC · JPL
560922	2015 NL_{4}	—	June 16, 2015	Haleakala	Pan-STARRS 1	·	2.6 km	MPC · JPL
560923	2015 NK_{6}	—	August 29, 2005	Kitt Peak	Spacewatch	·	540 m	MPC · JPL
560924	2015 NP_{6}	—	October 20, 2006	Kitt Peak	Spacewatch	·	530 m	MPC · JPL
560925	2015 NC_{7}	—	November 12, 2001	Apache Point	SDSS Collaboration	V	600 m	MPC · JPL
560926	2015 NB_{8}	—	September 18, 2009	Kitt Peak	Spacewatch	·	460 m	MPC · JPL
560927	2015 NQ_{8}	—	October 11, 2012	Kitt Peak	Spacewatch	·	610 m	MPC · JPL
560928	2015 ND_{13}	—	February 8, 2008	Kitt Peak	Spacewatch	·	2.7 km	MPC · JPL
560929	2015 NF_{18}	—	August 31, 2005	Palomar	NEAT	·	870 m	MPC · JPL
560930	2015 NF_{21}	—	August 4, 2002	Palomar	NEAT	·	610 m	MPC · JPL
560931	2015 NV_{27}	—	August 31, 2005	Kitt Peak	Spacewatch	·	1.4 km	MPC · JPL
560932	2015 NG_{30}	—	October 5, 2016	Mount Lemmon	Mount Lemmon Survey	·	2.6 km	MPC · JPL
560933	2015 NO_{34}	—	July 12, 2015	Haleakala	Pan-STARRS 1	·	1.4 km	MPC · JPL
560934	2015 OX_{6}	—	August 31, 2005	Kitt Peak	Spacewatch	·	590 m	MPC · JPL
560935	2015 OT_{8}	—	November 7, 2012	Haleakala	Pan-STARRS 1	·	690 m	MPC · JPL
560936	2015 OT_{10}	—	February 26, 2014	Mount Lemmon	Mount Lemmon Survey	V	530 m	MPC · JPL
560937	2015 OE_{11}	—	November 27, 2009	Mount Lemmon	Mount Lemmon Survey	·	620 m	MPC · JPL
560938	2015 OM_{12}	—	December 27, 2006	Mount Lemmon	Mount Lemmon Survey	NYS	980 m	MPC · JPL
560939	2015 OV_{14}	—	July 29, 2005	Palomar	NEAT	·	950 m	MPC · JPL
560940	2015 ON_{16}	—	February 6, 2007	Mount Lemmon	Mount Lemmon Survey	V	530 m	MPC · JPL
560941	2015 OV_{18}	—	August 7, 2008	Kitt Peak	Spacewatch	V	560 m	MPC · JPL
560942	2015 OE_{19}	—	July 12, 2015	Haleakala	Pan-STARRS 1	PHO	1.1 km	MPC · JPL
560943	2015 OL_{19}	—	July 18, 2015	Haleakala	Pan-STARRS 1	EOS	1.7 km	MPC · JPL
560944	2015 OW_{25}	—	October 1, 2005	Anderson Mesa	LONEOS	·	780 m	MPC · JPL
560945	2015 OG_{29}	—	July 23, 2015	Haleakala	Pan-STARRS 1	·	1.0 km	MPC · JPL
560946	2015 OD_{31}	—	April 28, 2011	Haleakala	Pan-STARRS 1	·	730 m	MPC · JPL
560947	2015 OF_{35}	—	November 28, 2005	Kitt Peak	Spacewatch	·	960 m	MPC · JPL
560948	2015 OC_{36}	—	August 13, 2001	Haleakala	NEAT	(2076)	940 m	MPC · JPL
560949	2015 OL_{38}	—	July 23, 2015	Haleakala	Pan-STARRS 1	·	1.4 km	MPC · JPL
560950	2015 OM_{41}	—	September 25, 2008	Kitt Peak	Spacewatch	·	870 m	MPC · JPL
560951	2015 OQ_{41}	—	October 16, 2011	Kitt Peak	Spacewatch	·	1.0 km	MPC · JPL
560952	2015 OV_{41}	—	February 27, 2009	Kitt Peak	Spacewatch	·	970 m	MPC · JPL
560953	2015 OK_{43}	—	November 17, 2006	Kitt Peak	Spacewatch	·	620 m	MPC · JPL
560954	2015 OX_{45}	—	August 15, 2004	Cerro Tololo	Deep Ecliptic Survey	·	1.3 km	MPC · JPL
560955	2015 OC_{46}	—	April 26, 2011	Mount Lemmon	Mount Lemmon Survey	·	830 m	MPC · JPL
560956	2015 OS_{52}	—	November 25, 2009	Kitt Peak	Spacewatch	·	510 m	MPC · JPL
560957	2015 OE_{57}	—	February 20, 2014	Haleakala	Pan-STARRS 1	PHO	940 m	MPC · JPL
560958	2015 OU_{58}	—	May 8, 2014	Haleakala	Pan-STARRS 1	·	950 m	MPC · JPL
560959	2015 OT_{59}	—	December 21, 2005	Kitt Peak	Spacewatch	·	960 m	MPC · JPL
560960	2015 OK_{62}	—	October 8, 2012	Kitt Peak	Spacewatch	·	670 m	MPC · JPL
560961	2015 OC_{63}	—	July 26, 2015	Haleakala	Pan-STARRS 1	T_{j} (2.96)	3.8 km	MPC · JPL
560962	2015 OD_{63}	—	July 26, 2015	Haleakala	Pan-STARRS 1	PHO	880 m	MPC · JPL
560963	2015 OG_{68}	—	August 29, 2005	Kitt Peak	Spacewatch	·	720 m	MPC · JPL
560964	2015 OW_{68}	—	October 15, 2012	Kitt Peak	Spacewatch	·	680 m	MPC · JPL
560965	2015 OP_{71}	—	March 15, 2008	Kitt Peak	Spacewatch	·	450 m	MPC · JPL
560966	2015 OS_{73}	—	October 19, 2011	Kitt Peak	Spacewatch	·	1.2 km	MPC · JPL
560967	2015 OL_{74}	—	December 3, 2012	Mount Lemmon	Mount Lemmon Survey	·	770 m	MPC · JPL
560968	2015 OR_{74}	—	February 28, 2014	Haleakala	Pan-STARRS 1	·	980 m	MPC · JPL
560969	2015 OM_{75}	—	August 6, 2008	La Sagra	OAM	·	700 m	MPC · JPL
560970	2015 OS_{75}	—	September 22, 2008	Mount Lemmon	Mount Lemmon Survey	·	1.0 km	MPC · JPL
560971	2015 OK_{76}	—	October 25, 2008	Kitt Peak	Spacewatch	·	930 m	MPC · JPL
560972	2015 OT_{77}	—	July 28, 2011	Haleakala	Pan-STARRS 1	V	730 m	MPC · JPL
560973	2015 OM_{84}	—	January 16, 2005	Mauna Kea	Veillet, C.	·	1.1 km	MPC · JPL
560974	2015 OE_{85}	—	July 23, 2015	Haleakala	Pan-STARRS 1	·	660 m	MPC · JPL
560975	2015 OC_{86}	—	September 22, 2008	Mount Lemmon	Mount Lemmon Survey	V	500 m	MPC · JPL
560976	2015 OA_{87}	—	April 10, 2010	Mount Lemmon	Mount Lemmon Survey	·	1.3 km	MPC · JPL
560977	2015 OL_{87}	—	November 17, 2012	Mount Lemmon	Mount Lemmon Survey	·	630 m	MPC · JPL
560978	2015 ON_{87}	—	November 19, 2007	Mount Lemmon	Mount Lemmon Survey	·	1.4 km	MPC · JPL
560979	2015 OB_{88}	—	July 19, 2015	Haleakala	Pan-STARRS 1	·	2.2 km	MPC · JPL
560980	2015 OX_{90}	—	March 31, 2003	Kitt Peak	Spacewatch	·	1.2 km	MPC · JPL
560981	2015 OO_{95}	—	October 23, 2008	Mount Lemmon	Mount Lemmon Survey	·	940 m	MPC · JPL
560982	2015 OL_{97}	—	September 22, 2008	Kitt Peak	Spacewatch	·	970 m	MPC · JPL
560983	2015 OM_{97}	—	February 9, 2014	Haleakala	Pan-STARRS 1	·	640 m	MPC · JPL
560984	2015 OS_{98}	—	February 8, 2002	Kitt Peak	Deep Ecliptic Survey	PHO	740 m	MPC · JPL
560985	2015 OF_{99}	—	October 25, 2011	Haleakala	Pan-STARRS 1	MAR	1.3 km	MPC · JPL
560986	2015 OJ_{100}	—	March 15, 2013	Kitt Peak	Spacewatch	·	1.8 km	MPC · JPL
560987	2015 OX_{103}	—	April 8, 2010	Kitt Peak	Spacewatch	·	1.4 km	MPC · JPL
560988	2015 OC_{105}	—	July 28, 2015	Haleakala	Pan-STARRS 1	·	740 m	MPC · JPL
560989	2015 ON_{105}	—	April 1, 2014	Kitt Peak	Spacewatch	V	460 m	MPC · JPL
560990	2015 OZ_{106}	—	July 27, 2015	Haleakala	Pan-STARRS 1	·	1.1 km	MPC · JPL
560991	2015 OA_{110}	—	October 28, 2005	Mount Lemmon	Mount Lemmon Survey	·	600 m	MPC · JPL
560992	2015 OB_{123}	—	July 24, 2015	Haleakala	Pan-STARRS 1	·	770 m	MPC · JPL
560993	2015 OS_{130}	—	July 24, 2015	Haleakala	Pan-STARRS 1	DOR	1.6 km	MPC · JPL
560994	2015 OM_{136}	—	May 7, 2014	Haleakala	Pan-STARRS 1	·	680 m	MPC · JPL
560995	2015 OY_{141}	—	July 25, 2015	Haleakala	Pan-STARRS 1	EUN	690 m	MPC · JPL
560996	2015 OO_{144}	—	July 25, 2015	Haleakala	Pan-STARRS 1	·	1.3 km	MPC · JPL
560997	2015 PA	—	November 1, 2011	Siding Spring	SSS	·	1.4 km	MPC · JPL
560998	2015 PW	—	April 2, 2009	Mount Lemmon	Mount Lemmon Survey	·	1.7 km	MPC · JPL
560999	2015 PF_{1}	—	October 19, 2012	Mount Lemmon	Mount Lemmon Survey	·	980 m	MPC · JPL
561000	2015 PJ_{1}	—	March 28, 2014	Mount Lemmon	Mount Lemmon Survey	·	920 m	MPC · JPL

back to top

== Meaning of names ==
As minor planet discoveries are confirmed, they are given a permanent number by the IAU's Minor Planet Center (MPC), and the discoverers can then submit names for them, following the IAU's naming conventions. The list below concerns those minor planets in the specified number-range that have received names, and explains the meanings of those names.

Official naming citations of newly named small Solar System bodies are approved and published in a bulletin by IAU's Working Group for Small Bodies Nomenclature (WGSBN). Before May 2021, citations were published in MPC's Minor Planet Circulars for many decades. Recent citations can also be found on the JPL Small-Body Database (SBDB). Until his death in 2016, German astronomer Lutz D. Schmadel compiled these citations into the Dictionary of Minor Planet Names (DMP) and regularly updated the collection.

Based on Paul Herget's The Names of the Minor Planets, Schmadel also researched the unclear origin of numerous asteroids, most of which had been named prior to World War II. This article incorporates text from this source, which is in the public domain: SBDB New namings may only be added to this list below after official publication as the preannouncement of names is condemned. The WGSBN publishes a comprehensive guideline for the naming rules of non-cometary small Solar System bodies.

Named minor planet	Provisional	This minor planet was named for...	Ref · Catalog
560085 Perperikon	2015 FV_{68}	Perperikon is the largest megalithic archaeological complex in the Balkans, located in the East Rhodope Mountains, Bulgaria.	IAU · 560085
560354 Chrisnolan	2015 FW_{291}	Christopher Nolan (born 1970), a British-American film director, producer, and screenwriter.	IAU · 560354
560388 Normafa	2015 FX_{317}	Normafa is a popular tourist area in Budapest, not far from the Konkoly Observatory's headquarters. It is located in the Buda Hills, and is mainly known for its panoramic scenery.	IAU · 560388
560522 Gombaszögi	2015 GB_{33}	Ella Gombaszögi (1894–1951), a Hungarian actress and film star.	IAU · 560522
560794 Ugoboncompagni	2015 KB_{143}	Pope Gregory XIII (born Ugo Boncompagni, 1502–1585), commissioner of the Gregorian calendar. He built the Gregorian Tower one of the earliest astronomical observatories in the Vatican.	IAU · 560794
