= Power-off accuracy approach =

Type of aviation exercise

A power-off accuracy approach, also known as a glide approach, is an aviation exercise used to simulate a landing with an engine failure. The purpose of this training technique is to better develop one's ability to estimate distance and glide ratios. The variation in each angle refers to the degrees an aircraft must turn to be aligned with the runway. Consideration of the wind and use of flaps are important factors in executing power-off accuracy approaches.

When the throttle is closed, it is intended to simulate engine failure.

== Iterations of power-off approaches ==
=== 90° power-off ===
A 90° approach calls for the throttle to be closed when the aircraft is angled 45° from centerline. On Base leg, the airspeed needs to be lowered to the manufacturer's recommended glide speed. In order to stretch the gliding distance, pilots will often pitch up momentarily to attain best glide speed, also known as Vg. Once this speed is reached, the nose of the plane is slightly lowered to maintain the current airspeed. When turning final, if the pilot justifies that the plane is above the glide path and altitude must be lost, flaps can be used as needed.

Depending on the strength of the wind, the pilot will adjust the base leg to be closer or further away from the runway's approach end. Stronger winds tend to result in the closest base, while weaker winds allow for a closer to normal traffic pattern.

=== 180° power-off ===
This variation is an extension of the 90° approach. For the Power-Off 180, on the Downwind leg, the pilot pulls the power to idle when abeam the intended landing point. Immediately following throttle to idle, the plane is pitched to Vg, which is the best glide speed determined by the manufacturer. At this point, the pilot now judges the gliding distance and determines an appropriate time to turn base. When approaching final, the pilot should have a general idea if they are above or below the glide path, which will in turn affect their use of flaps or a Forward Slip.

This maneuver is part of the United States Department of Transportation, Federal Aviation Administration (FAA) Commercial Pilot – Airplane Airmen Certification Standards. According to the FAA, completion of this standard demonstrates a pilot's ability to:

Touch down at a proper pitch attitude, within 200 feet beyond or on the specified point with no side drift and with the airplane's longitudinal axis aligned with and over the runway centerline or landing path, as applicable.

— The U.S Department of Transportation, Federal Aviation Administration (FAA), Commercial Pilot - Airplane Airman Certification Standards FAA-S-ACS-7A, IV. Takeoffs, Landings, and Go-Arounds

=== 360° power-off ===
The 360° Power-off approach requires the plane to glide in a circular pattern, starting 2,000 ft or more, above the intended landing point. When the aircraft is positioned over the landing point, the throttle is closed and again, the proper glide speed must be attained. After establishing the appropriate speed, the pilot can safely steer the plane using medium turns to approach downwind leg. The plane should be around 1,000 to 1,200 ft above the ground at the spot where the plane is parallel to the intended point of landing, in relation to downwind leg. When arriving at base leg position, the plane should be around 800 ft above the terrain.

== Factors ==
=== Wind ===
Wind plays a crucial role in Power-off accuracy maneuvers. If pilots fail to take into account the wind, the performance and accuracy of the maneuver becomes swayed.

=== Flaps ===
In each of the power-off accuracy approaches, flaps are a mechanism that can be used to assist in performing the maneuver. Stalling speed is reduced and drag is increased when flaps are extended. This allows for a steeper and slower approach. However, depending on weather conditions or other circumstances, such as prolonged extension of downwind or base leg, use of flaps may not be required.

== Common errors ==
The Airplane Flying Handbook of the Federal Aviation Administration lists common mistakes pilots make when performing power-off accuracy approaches. A few of these errors are listed below.

- Force landing to avoid overshooting designated landing spot
- Extending flaps and/or gears prematurely
- Downwind leg too far from the runway
- Poor compensation of wind drift
- Overextension of downwind leg

== See also ==
- Turbine engine failure
