= Signal square =

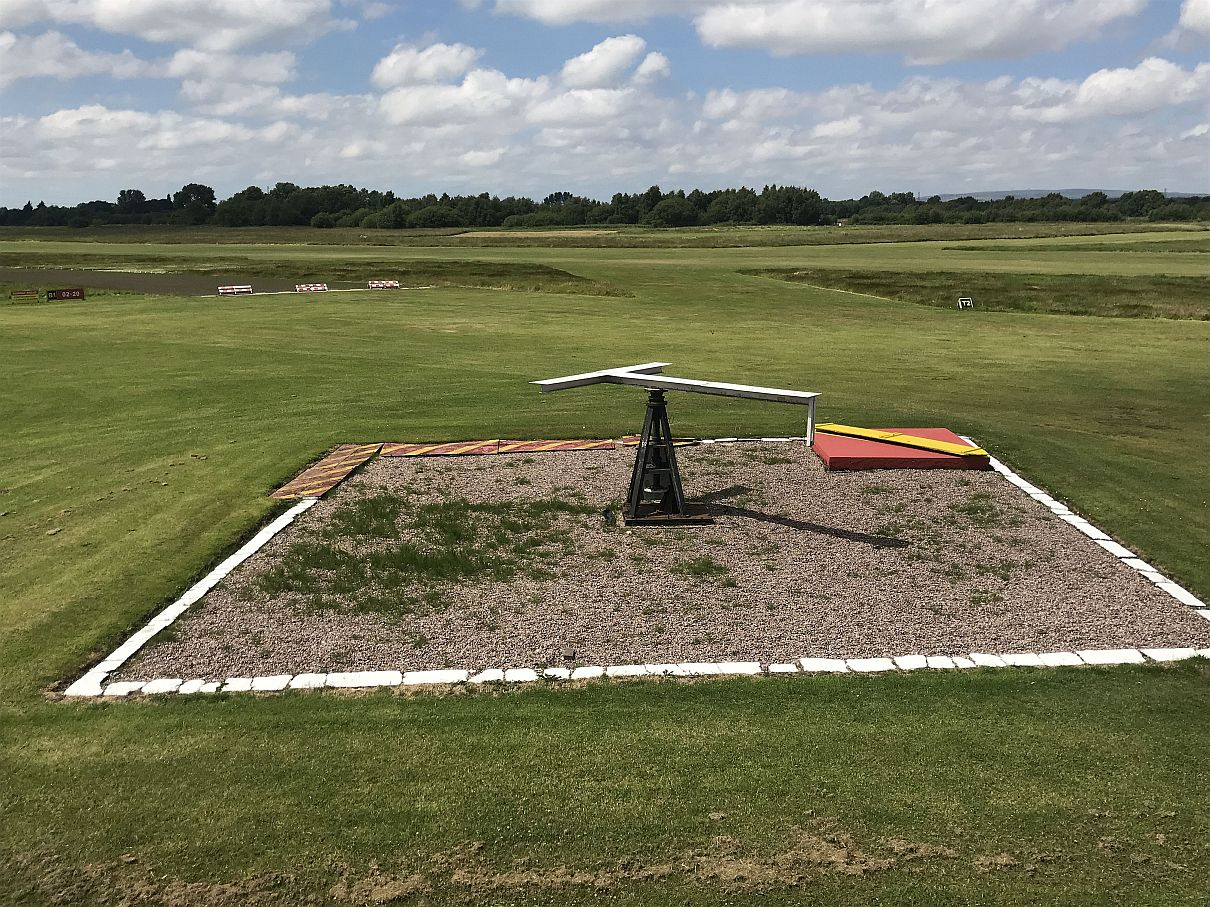
Signal square at Manchester Barton Aerodrome in England (23 June 2024) showing the landing direction, right hand circuit, and ground conditions (grass runways and taxiways)

A signal square is aerodrome equipment defined internationally at annex 14 of the Convention on International Civil Aviation by the International Civil Aviation Organization.

It contains ground symbols that visually indicate aerodrome conditions to over-flying aircraft. There are four basic signals.

In the UK, the internal sides of the square should measure 12 metres, "bordered by a white strip 30 centimetres wide" and "so located on the aerodrome that it is visible from all approach directions." According to Schedule 1, Section 9 of the Rules of the Air Regulations 2007, further illustrates the dimensions of each particular signal, e.g. both arms of the landing T should be 4 metres long and 40cm thick, and the dumbbell sign should consist of three sections, each 1.5m long. The sides of the red panel with the yellow cross should be 3m, with the crossing lines being 50cm wide. All dimensions shall be "subject to a tolerance of 10 per cent, plus or minus." The same documents include the H sign, which indicates a landing area for helicopters, commonly used on a helipad (but not a circle around the letter H), and this should be displayed in the Signals Area. According to the UK Civil Aviation Authority, these visual aids can be used at aerodromes with significant general aviation movements.

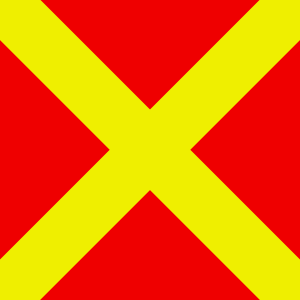
A horizontal red square panel with yellow diagonals, when displayed in a signal area, indicates that landings are prohibited and that the prohibition is liable to be prolonged.

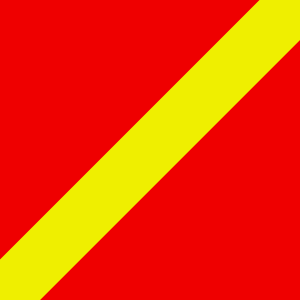
A horizontal red square panel with one yellow diagonal when displayed in a signal area indicates that owing to the bad state of the manoeuvring area, or for any other reason, special precautions must be observed in approaching to land or in landing.

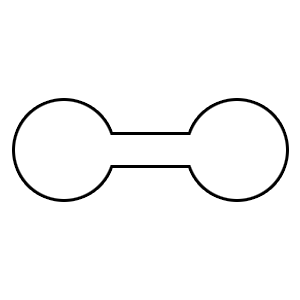
A horizontal white dumb-bell when displayed in a signal area indicates that aircraft are required to land, take off and taxi on runways and taxiways only.

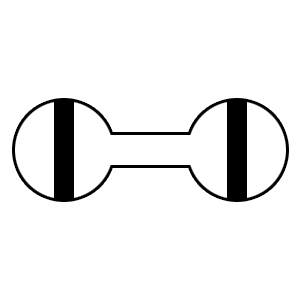
The horizontal white dumb-bell but with a black bar placed perpendicular to the shaft across each circular portion of the dumb-bell when displayed in a signal area indicates that aircraft are required to land and take off on runways only, but other manoeuvres need not be confined to runways and taxiways.

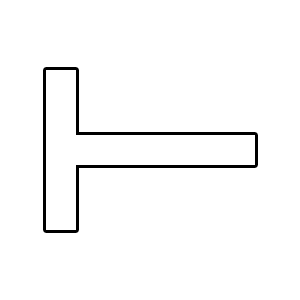
The landing T, showing the wind direction on an all-over landing field with the tail of the T pointing downwind. On airfields with runways it indicates the landing and take-off direction.

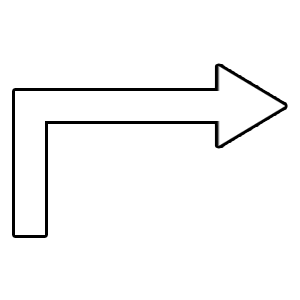
The right hand circuit indicator

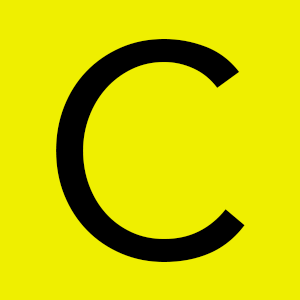
Air traffic services reporting office

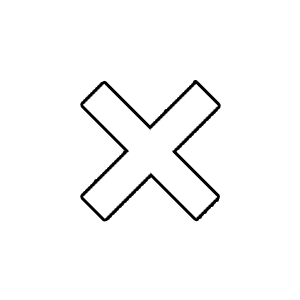
Closed runways or taxiways

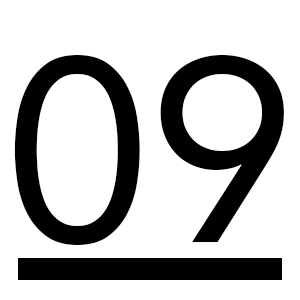
Directions for landing or take off, runway in use

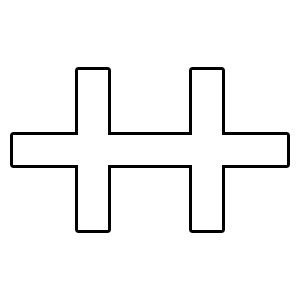
Glider flights in operation

== See also ==
- Air navigation
- Aircraft marshalling
- Air-to-ground communication
- Index of aviation articles
