= Air Traffic Controller (series) =

- Genre: Simulation
- Developer: TechnoBrain
- Publisher: TechnoBrain
- Platforms: PC, PlayStation Portable, Game Boy Advance, Nintendo DS, Nintendo 3DS, Android, iOS

Air Traffic Controller (ぼくは航空管制官, Boku wa Kōkū Kanseikan; shortened as ATC) is a simulation computer game series, developed by TechnoBrain, that simulates the operation of an airport. The games simulate the job of an air traffic controller. The player's mission is to direct planes onto the correct ILS, land them on the runway, taxi them to the correct gate, and to direct takeoffs.

Air Traffic Controller was released in Japan in September 1998. Its sequel Air Traffic Controller 2 was released in 2001. Air Traffic Controller 3 was released in 2008. Air Traffic Controller 4 was released in 2015.

Initially released as a computer game, there have also been five PlayStation Portable versions, a Game Boy Advance version, a Nintendo DS version, nine Nintendo 3DS versions and five different mobile ports for both Android and iOS.

== Air Traffic Controller ==
The game features six airports. Players direct the air traffic for arrival and departures. There is only one channel of communication.

- Air Traffic Controller
  - Airports featured: Miyazaki Airport, Hiroshima-Nishi Airport, Matsuyama Airport, Osaka International Airport, Nagoya Airfield and Tokyo International Airport.
- Air Traffic Controller Power Up Kit 1
  - Airports: Saga Airport, Fukuoka Airport and Komatsu Airport.
- Air Traffic Controller Power Up Kit 1 Value Pack
  - Airports: ATC + Power Kit 1
- Air Traffic Controller Power Up Kit 2
  - Airports: Kansai International Airport, Narita International Airport and New Chitose Airport.
- Air Traffic Controller Power Up Kit 2 Value Pack
  - Airports: ATC + Power Kit 2
- Air Traffic Controller Power Up Kit 3
  - Airports: none.
- Air Traffic Controller Complete
  - Airports: ATC + Power Kit 1 + Power Kit 2

== Air Traffic Controller 2 ==
Air Traffic Controller 2 made many improvements to the first entry. The game is now in 3D, has more airport gates, and increased to five channels of communication: Approach, Tower, Ground, Delivery, and Departure. New features included ground movements (e.g. towing planes to gates), giving correct Standard Instrument Departure, use of radar vectors, and changing channel frequency. The choice of Standard Terminal Arrival Route distance eliminates the speed instruction in previous version.

In the game, there are a few conditions that will cause game over. These include head-on, near miss, pilots' pressure bar reaching 100%, or failed to accumulate enough points to pass that particular stage. The points are awarded according to how fast to reply a response. A slow or non-response will raise the pressure bar. Other things that increase pressure bar include instructing the plane to take off in tailwind or tower failing to give the plane permission to land or go-around. Additional points are awarded at the end of the stage, but before deciding whether there's enough points to pass, for minimal % in pressure bar. More bonus points are awarded if the pressure bar is at 0%.

=== Tokyo: BigWing A (Alpha) ===
- Airport: Tokyo International Airport
- Release date: 2001
- Airlines: Japan Airlines, All Nippon Airways, Skymark Airlines, Hokkaido International Airlines, Japan Air System (Before merger with Japan Airlines), Japan Coast Guard, China Airlines and EVA Air.

There is also an airline company named after the developer of the game TechnoBrain, TechnoBrain Airlines (ICAO: TBA). Whenever TechnoBrain Airlines plane appears, special events are triggered.

=== Tokyo: BigWing B (Bravo) ===
- Airport: Tokyo International Airport
- Release date: 2001

Largely the same as Tokyo: BigWing A, but with a stage set in the evening.

=== Kagoshima Island Control ===
- Airport: Kagoshima Airport, New Tanegashima Airport, Yakushima Airport
- Airlines: Japan Airlines, All Nippon Airways, JALways, Japan Air System, J-Air, Oriental Air Bridge and Polar Air Cargo
- Release date: 2002
- Special feature: Radio control, For communications with Tanegashima Airport and Yakushima Airport.
- Special event: During Stage 2–3, if all aircraft land before 10:15, a rocket will launch from Tanegashima Space Center.

TechnoBrain released an updated version in 2005. Changes include the merger between Japan Airlines and Japan Air System, as well as other features.

=== Komatsu Base Aviation Festival ===
- Airport: Komatsu Airport
- Airlines: Japan Airlines, All Nippon Airways, Air Nippon, Japan Air System and Japan Air Self-Defense Force.
- Release date: 2002
- Special feature: No Delivery Control, jobs taken over by Ground Control.
- Special event: During Stage 1-3 and 2–1, there will be an air show. Stage 2-2, It has been replaced by a Q&A, player must answer questions correctly to complete the stage.

=== Narita: Gate of Japan ===
- Airport: Narita International Airport
- Release date: 2002

=== Tokyo: BigWing Complete ===
- Airport: Tokyo International Airport
- Special feature: Airbus Beluga makes an appearance as the last plane to approach, land, and park in the airport at the last stage.

=== Nagoya: Jumble Airport ===
- Airport: Nagoya Airfield
- Airlines: All Nippon Airways, Nakanihon Air Service, Japan Air System (later merged with Japan Airlines), China Eastern Airlines, J-Air (airline subsidiary of Japan Airlines), Japan Air Self-Defense Force, Northwest Airlines, Thai Airways International, and Varig
- Release date: 2003

=== Narita: Star Light Airways ===
- Airport: Narita International Airport
- Special feature: At stage 4–1, snowing occurs. At stage 4–3, Concorde makes a special appearance at the end.

=== Okinawa: A Wake on the Southward Raise ===
- Airport: Naha Airport, Kadena Air Base
- Special feature: "Okinawa Approach Control (Kadena rapcon)". SR-71 makes an appearance as the last plane to approach, land, and park in Kadena Air Base at the last stage.

=== Sendai: First Flight, First Control ===
- Airport: Sendai Airport
- Special feature: Flight training in Civil Aviation College. No delivery channel. In stage 2–1, all runways are closed in the beginning due to low visibility by the fog.

=== Chitose: SnowScape ===
- Airport: New Chitose Airport
- Special feature: during stage 2-2 and 2–3, snowstorm forces the runways to be closed.

=== Kansai: Cross Over Area ===
- Airport: Kansai International Airport
- Special feature: Taxiway will be closed in stage 2-2 due to an object fallen off a plane. The runway lights malfunctioned in stage 2–3, resulting in closure of the runway.

=== Fukuoka: Oriental Wings ===
- Airport: Fukuoka Airport
- Special feature: stage 2–1 to 2–3, circling approach (not used now) to runway 34. Taxiway will be closed in stage 1-3 due to breakdown of nose gear.

=== Tokyo: BigWing Dual Site ===
- Airport: Tokyo International Airport
- Special Feature: In stage 2-2 and 2–3, China's and Russia's presidential plane plus Air Force One makes an appearance.

=== Osaka: InterCity Airport ===
- Airport: Osaka International Airport
- Special feature: Contains 2 mini-games within the game - directing the pilot to a gate parking and controlling the ground vehicle to move planes around. This is a first in the video game.

=== Narita: Complete ===
- Airport: Narita International Airport
- This series combined "Narita: Gate of Japan" and "Narita: Star Light Airways" onto the same disc, with minor content changes.

=== Centrair International Airport ===
- Airport: Chūbu Centrair International Airport
- Special feature: Stage 2-3 features Airbus A380. Stage 2-2 and 2-3 feature Boeing 747LCF.

=== Kansai: Brightly Path ===
- Airport: Kansai International Airport
- Special feature: An additional 4000m runway is opened for use. An airship can be seen in stage 2–3.

== Air Traffic Controller 3 ==
This sequel provides more camera angles with higher flexibility. The aircraft are now to scale with real aircraft. Arrivals and departures are now combined into a single box with strips outlining details of each flight. The strips can be ordered according to user preferences. Even more gates are added in this version. Planes taxiing can now choose any taxiway, instead of limited by up to 4 routes in previous version. Rules are identical to previous version. It also features first non-Japan airport, Kai Tak Airport in Hong Kong. Additionally, a fictional airline called "TechnoBrain Airlines" (based on the company's name, abbreviated TBA) features here as it did in ATC2, presenting problems that the player has to solve or work around. TBA does not make any appearance in Kai Tak. Later, it featured the second non-Japan airport, Honolulu International Airport.

=== Tokyo BigWing ===
- Airport: Tokyo International Airport
- Airlines: Japan Airlines, All Nippon Airways, Skymark Airlines, Hokkaido International Airlines, Japan Coast Guard
- Release date: February 25, 2008
- Version: 1.03B (patch from official site)
- Special Events: During Stage 3, the first aircraft to take off from runway 16L will encounter a bird strike and taxi back to the gate. Stage 6, aircraft landing at either runway 34L and 34R will trigger microburst and windshear, causing closure of runway 34L and 34R for some time.

=== Okinawa BlueCorridor ===
- Airport: Naha Airport
- Airlines: Japan Transocean Air, All Nippon Airways, Skymark Airlines, Japan Coast Guard, China Airlines, China Eastern Airlines, Asiana Airlines, Galaxy Airlines, Japan Air Self-Defense Force, Ryukyu Air Commuter
- Release date: July 2, 2008
- Version: 1.03 (patch from official site)
- Special Events: During Stage 4, US Space Shuttle Enterprise will land at Kaneda Air Base. During Stage 5, a NASA Aircraft will land at Kaneda Air Base. During Stage 6, the NASA Aircraft will carry Space Shuttle Enterprise back to Guam

=== Osaka ParallelContact ===
- Airport: Osaka International Airport
- Airlines: Japan Airlines, All Nippon Airways, Japan Air Commuter, and JAL Express
- Release date: October 24, 2008
- Special events: Expect any Techno Air plane to cause problems for you in any stage they appear in, which range from medical emergencies leading to requests back to gate, to outright landing blunders or Cargo Fire.

=== ANA Edition ===
- Airport: Tokyo International Airport
- Airlines: All Nippon Airways
- Release date: November 1, 2001
- Featuring the ANA Gold Jet and the ability to see how parts move on the aircraft such as the flaps and landing gear. It also lets you view the aircraft 360°.

=== Tokyo BigWing (English version) ===
- Airport: Tokyo International Airport
- Release date: November 17, 2008
- Version: 1.06
- All Japanese Airlines have been replaced with generic colour name (e.g. blue, red, yellow, and green) due to copyright issue.

=== Hong Kong Kai Tak International Airport ===
- Airport: Kai Tak Airport
- Airlines: Cathay Pacific, Cathay Dragon, China Eastern Airlines, Air France, Northwest Airlines, Northwest Cargo Airlines, Eva Air, All Nippon Airways, Japan Airlines, Garuda Indonesia, Air Hong Kong
- Release date: February 27, 2009
- Version: 1.00
- Featuring first airport outside Japan and More Difficult Stages including more frequent near-misses, TechnoBrain Air doesn't make an appearance.
- New Aircraft including Boeing 747-200/F, McDonnell Douglas MD-11 and Lockheed L-1011
- A lot of airline will present in their historical liveries.
- Chep Lap Kok International Airport makes an appearance in the opening and under construction in the game.

=== Sendai Airmanship ===
- Airport: Sendai Airport
- Airlines:Japan Trans Ocean Air, All Nippon Cargo Japan Airlines, All Nippon Airways, Hokkaido International Airlines, Ibex Airlines, Eva Air, Asiana Airlines, Japan Coast Guard, Ministry of Land, Infrastructure and Transport, Aviation University
- Release date: June 26, 2009
- Special Features: The function of speed reduction is returned. No delivery channel, job taken over by Ground.
- Special Events: During Stage 5, a Ministry of Land, Infrastructure, Transport and Tourism (MLIT) Dash 8 Q400 will perform Runway Inspection.

=== New Chitose SnowingDay ===
- Airport: New Chitose Airport
- Airlines: Japan Airlines, All Nippon Airways, Hokkaido International Airlines, Ibex Airlines, Skymark Airlines, SAT Airlines, Nippon Cargo Airlines, China Eastern Airlines, Cathay Pacific Airways, China Airlines, Japan Coast Guard, Japan Air Self-Defense Force, Hokkaido Air System
- Air Force One (official airliner of the USA President) and Escort One (jet fighters escorting Air Force One) make appearance at the very end.
- Release date: October 22, 2009
- Special Feature: During Stage 2, 5, 6, runway snow plowing will become an option (runway with heavy snow will cause the runway to be closed).
- Special Events: During Stage 4, Japan Government 747 will land at New Chitose Airport with Fighter Jet escort, a F-15 Aircraft marked UNKNOWN (Imaginary Enemy) on radar will appear near the Government 747 for Aerial Exercise; after exercise the escort will fly away, Japan Government 747 will land on 18L (without landing clearance needed.). During Stage 5, Japan Coast Guard Aircraft will take off for Emergency Rescue Operation.

=== Kansai International Airport CrossOver ===
- Airport: Kansai International Airport
- Airlines: Japan Airlines, All Nippon Airways, Skymark Airlines, Asiana Airlines, Eva Air, China Eastern Airlines, Cathay Pacific Airways, Thai Airways International, Air France, Finnair, Garuda Indonesia, United Airlines, Nippon Cargo Airlines, United Parcel Service, Japan Coast Guard
- Release date: February 25, 2010 (Limited Edition), March 19, 2010 (Regular)
- Altitude separation and visual approach features are added
- There is also ability to control Osaka International Airport and Kobe Airport aircraft traffic
- Bird management to chase birds away from a runway causes the runway to be momentarily closed in the middle of stage 4.

=== ExtendScenario 1 (expansion pack) ===
- Airport: Tokyo International Airport, Osaka International Airport.
- Airlines: Japan Airlines (both airports), All Nippon Airways (both airports), JAL Express (Osaka), Japan Air System (Osaka), Japan Air Commuter (Osaka), Ibex Airlines (Osaka), Hokkaido International Airlines (Tokyo), Skymark Airlines (Tokyo), Skynet Asia Airways, Ministry of Land, Infrastructure and Transport (Tokyo)
- Release date: June 21, 2010 (download only)
- Each airport has 2 additional stages. Concorde makes an appearance in Tokyo International Airport. Skynet Asia Airways, previously included in ATC2, makes a return appearance to Tokyo International Airport. An All Nippon Airways jet tests on the taxiway in the new international terminal in Tokyo International Airport. A plane which belongs to Ministry of Land, Infrastructure and Transport conducts an ILS testing on Tokyo International Airport's 4th runway, the D runway.
  Japan Airlines, All Nippon Airways, and JAL Express use their old liveries in one of two stages in Osaka International Airport while Japan Air System and Japan Air Commuter use their liveries prior to the merger with Japan Airlines. Ibex Airlines, previously included in ATC2, makes a return appearance to Osaka International Airport. Commercial YS-11 makes an appearance in Osaka International Airport.

=== Tokyo Dream Gateway ===
- Airport: Tokyo International Airport
- Airlines: Japan Airlines, All Nippon Airways, Hokkaido International Airlines, Skymark Airlines, Skynet Asia Airways, Cathay Pacific Airways, Asiana Airlines, China Eastern Airlines, Shanghai Airlines, China Airlines, EVA Air, Thai Airways International, AirAsia X, Hawaiian Airlines, United Airlines, Japan Coast Guard, Japan Air Self-Defense Force, Ministry of Land, Infrastructure and Transport
- Release date: August 26, 2010 (Limited Edition), September 27, 2010 (Regular)
- Features the new D-Runway, new international terminal, and new control tower.
- In stage 4, there is heavy fog around the airport which forces all runways except 34R to be shut down for 30 minutes.

=== ExtendScenario 2 (expansion pack) ===
- Airport: Sendai Airport, New Chitose Airport
- Airlines: Japan Airlines (both airports), All Nippon Airways (both airports), Hokkaido International Airlines (both airports), Ibex Airlines (both airports), EVA Air (Sendai), Aviation University (Sendai), Asiana Airlines (Sendai), Cathay Pacific Airways (New Chitose), China Eastern Airlines (New Chitose), China Airlines (New Chitose), Japan Coast Guard (New Chitose), Japan Air Self-Defense Force (New Chitose), SAT Airlines (New Chitose), Skymark Airlines (New Chitose)
- Release date: October 18, 2010 (download only)

=== Kagoshima Islandline ===
- Airport: Kagoshima Airport, Yakushima Airport, Tanegashima Airport, Amami Airport, Kikai Airport, Tokunoshima Airport, Okinoerabu Airport, Yoron Airport
- Airlines: Japan Airlines, All Nippon Airways, Skymark Airlines, Oriental Air Bridge, Skynet Asia Airways, Nakanihon Air Service, China Airlines, China Eastern Airlines, Japan Coast Guard, Japan Air Self-Defense Force, Nippon Cargo Airlines
- Release date: December 17, 2010 (Limited Edition), January 21, 2011 (Regular)
- In stage 4, there are 2 planes doing touch-and-go (both planes) and simulation ILS training (plane 2).
- In stage 5, a typhoon approaches. Most planes going to the islands in the south return to Kagoshima because airports are closed.

=== Ibaraki Airshow ===
- Airport: Ibaraki Airport
- Airlines: Skymark Airlines, Asiana Airlines, Japan Coast Guard, Japan Air Self-Defense Force, United States Air Force, United States Navy
- Release date: March 24, 2011
- Special Feature: A brand new way to play ATC 3, instead of having a Stress bar on the top, it will be replaced with a Score Combo Bar. Player will have to manage the Air Show accordingly in order to gain points and combo.

=== Honolulu International Airport ===
- Airport: Honolulu International Airport
- Airlines: Japan Airlines, Hawaiian Airlines, United Airlines, China Airlines, UPS, Washin Air
- Release date: July 22, 2011 (Limited Edition)
- Second airport outside Japan
- Special feature: HCF Approach (takes over the job of Departure and Approach). Water Runway and Aircraft introduced in Honolulu Airport.

=== ExtendScenario 3 (expansion pack) ===
- Airport: Kansai Airport, Kagoshima Airport
- Airlines: Japan Airlines (both airports), All Nippon Airways (both airports), Skymark Airlines (both airports), China Eastern Airlines (Kansai), Asiana Airlines (Kansai), EVA Air (Kansai), Cathay Pacific Airways (Kansai), Thai Airways International (Kansai), Garuda Indonesia (Kansai), Air France (Kansai), Finnair (Kansai), United Airlines (Kansai), Solaseed Airlines (previously known as Skynet Asia Airways and rebranded in July 2011, new livery appearance in Kagoshima), Nakanihon Air Service (Kagoshima), Japan Marine Force (Kagoshima)
- Release date: September 26, 2011 (download only)

=== Narita World Wings ===
- Airport: Narita International Airport
- Airlines:Japan Airlines Cargo, American Airlines, Japan Express, Japan Airlines, Skymark Airlines, Ibex Airlines, Air Canada, Aeroméxico, China Eastern Airlines, Asiana Airlines, EVA Air, China Air, Cathay Pacific Airways, Thai Airways International, Garuda Indonesia, Air France, Finnair, United Airlines, Philippine Airlines, China Cargo Airlines, Nippon Cargo Airlines, United Parcel Services (UPS), China Airlines Cargo
- Release date: December 22, 2011 (Deluxe Edition), January 20, 2012 (Regular)
- Special Feature: First Airport Campaign in ATC 3 that does not have ANA present in the Airport and first airport that introduces Airbus A380 during gameplay. China Eastern Airline will use Chinese Mandarin and Japanese for Cabin Announcement; China Airlines, EVA Air will use Japanese and Taiwanese (Taiwan's traditional language) for Cabin Announcement.
- Special Event: During Stage 4, wind direction will change gradually, runway will change from 34L/R to 16L/R during gameplay. During Stage 5, An Air Canada Aircraft will lost its way during heavy fog, in that case a Follow Me vehicle will be directed to the aircraft (taxiing speed will be low for aircraft when Follow Me vehicle is assigned).

=== ExtendScenario 4 (expansion pack) ===
- Airport: Kai Tak Airport, New Chitose Airport
- Airlines: Japan Airlines (both airports), All Nippon Airways (both airports), Skymark Airlines (New Chitose), China Eastern Airlines (both airports), EVA Air (Kai Tak), China Airlines (New Chitose), Cathay Pacific Airways (both airports), Dragonair (Kai Tak), Garuda Indonesia (Kai Tak), Air France (Kai Tak), Air Hong Kong (Kai Tak), United Airlines (Kansai), Ibex Airlines (New Chitose), Japan Coast Guard (New Chitose), Japan Air Self-Defense Force (New Chitose), Hokkaido International Airlines (New Chitose), Hokkaido Air System (New Chitose)
- Release date: January 26, 2012 (download only)
- Added international terminal and gates to New Chitose Airport

=== ExtendScenario 5 (expansion pack) ===
- Airport: Naha Airport, Ibaraki Airport
- Airlines: Japan Transocean Air (Naha), All Nippon Airways (Naha), Skymark Airlines (both airports), China Eastern Airlines (Naha), China Airlines (Naha), Asiana Airlines (Ibaraki), Japan Coast Guard (Ibaraki), Japan Air Self-Defense Force (Ibaraki), United States Air Force (Ibaraki), United States Navy (Ibaraki), Ryukyu Air Commuter (Naha)
- Release date: March 12, 2012 (download only)
- Cargo terminal and stands for aircraft parking are moved to northern part of the airport. International terminal expands and takes over the previous cargo terminal area

=== ANA 787 Edition ===
- Airport: Tokyo International Airport
- Airlines: All Nippon Airways
- Release date: April 27, 2012
- Boeing 787 has its first appearance in this episode.
- JAL has been replaced with generic colour name (Red).
- Apart from the two conventional stages, there are also 2 mini-games - directing the pilot to a gate parking and controlling the ground vehicle to move planes around (similar to those in ATC2).

=== Narita Night Wings ===
- Airport: Narita International Airport
- Airlines: Japan Airlines, Skymark Airlines, Ibex Airlines, Aeroméxico, China Eastern Airlines, Asiana Airlines, EVA Air, China Air, Cathay Pacific Airways, Thai Airways International, Garuda Indonesia, Air France, Finnair, United Airlines, Philippine Airlines, China Cargo Airlines, Nippon Cargo Airlines, United Parcel Services (UPS), China Airlines Cargo, Cathay Pacific Cargo airlines, All Nippon Airways
- Release date: June 22, 2012 (Limited Edition), July 20, 2012 (Regular)
- Special Feature: Night version of Narita World Wings. ANA returns to Narita Airport (Narita World Wing do not have ANA present). Certain stages will have sudden Taxiway Inspection and Maintenance, causing taxiway closed for certain period of time, Aircraft run into it will cause stage to fail.

=== JAL Edition ===
- Airport: Tokyo International Airport
- Airlines: Japan Airlines
- Release date: October 11, 2012 (Limited Edition), November 10, 2012 (Regular)
- Apart from the two conventional stages, there are also 2 mini-games which are different from those appeared before - parking a Boeing 787 at a spot and directing a jet bridge to that parked plane.

=== ExtendScenario 6 (expansion pack) ===
- Airport: Tokyo International Airport (Dream Gateway), Kagoshima Airport
- Release date: October 26, 2012 (download only)
- This package provides 4 stages for each airport. Dedicated for beginners, all stages are very easy.

=== ExtendScenario 7 (expansion pack) ===
- Airport: Tokyo International Airport (Dream Gateway), Kagoshima Airport
- Release date: November 29, 2012 (download only)
- This package provides 3 stages for each airport. Dedicated for experts, all stages are very difficult.

=== Chubu Centrair International Airport ===
- Airport: Chūbu Centrair International Airport
- Airlines: Japan Airlines, Skymark Airlines, Ibex Airlines, All Nippon Airways, China Airlines, Nippon Cargo Airlines, EVA Airways, United Airlines, Thai Airways International, Cathay Pacific Airways, Finnair, Philippine Airlines, Asiana Airlines
- Release date: November 16, 2012 (Limited Edition), December 21, 2012 (Regular)
- Special Feature: First Appearance of B747-400-LCF and B747-8F Freighter Aircraft. In the final few stages there will be an Air Show in the Airport which gives player a greater challenge.

== Air Traffic Controller 4 ==
Air Traffic Controller 4 is an air traffic control simulation game developed by TechnoBrain as a successor to the Air Traffic Controller 3. The game is compatible with Windows 7, Windows 8, Windows 8.1 and Windows 10, until ROAH - Naha, which is no longer compatible with Windows 7 and 8. The first installment, RJTT - Haneda was originally planned to be released on July 15, 2015, but the developers delayed the release of the game to August 28, 2015. However, TechnoBrain delayed again to September 17, 2015, for testing the Windows 10 compatibility.

Since March 22, 2018, TechnoBrain released RJTT2 - Haneda 2, RJFF - Fukuoka, RJGG - Centrair, RJCC - New Chitose, ROAH - Naha, and RJSS - Sendai on Android and iOS.

Airports and airplanes are more realistically scaled. In-game time counter is now progressing as the same speed as real time. Furthermore, more gates are added for every airport to match their real-life counterparts compared to the previous games. There are also stages based on the actual schedule of the airports of which the players can select the time frame and channels they wish to take charge. Players can't choose runway for the plane to takeoff, landing nor even go-around unless the runway section (e.g. 16L, 16R. etc.) are opened due to changes to the wind pattern (only for RJTT - Haneda). Unlike the previous games, if the planes line up to follow another, the game will not result in a head-on collision game over (only in Normal Mode) unless they're heading into each other. Players can select planes at the top of it or at the flight control selection bar (bottom-right during gameplay). TechnoBrain Airlines also appears here like in ATC3, occasionally presenting problems for players to solve or work around (for the main stages of the game) as well as replacing airlines not included in game.

Similar to previous games, the game consists of two modes (Normal Mode and Game Mode). Game Mode is more challenging because player needs to pay attention to the planes on the ground to prevent head-on game over. However, these two modes were later omitted for future installments.

The game consists of 10 total installments and 4 expansion packs as of August 2022.

=== RJTT - Haneda ===
- Airport: Tokyo International Airport
- Airlines: Japan Airlines, All Nippon Airways, Japan Transocean Air, Skymark Airlines, Solaseed Air (formerly known as Skynet Asia Airways as mentioned in the game), Air Do, Japan Coast Guard, Asiana Airlines, China Airlines, EVA Air, Cathay Pacific Airways, Garuda Indonesia, Philippine Airlines, Singapore Airlines, Thai Airways International.
- Release date: September 17, 2015
- Version: 1.41 (patch from official website)
- A remake of RJTT - Haneda (titled RJTT2 - Haneda 2) was developed by Technobrain (more information below).

=== RJBB - Kanku ===
- Airport: Kansai International Airport
- Airlines: JAL Group, All Nippon Airways, Skymark Airlines, Solaseed Air, StarFlyer, Peach Aviation, Jetstar Japan, Japan Coast Guard, Asiana Airlines, China Airlines, EVA Airways, Cathay Pacific Airways, Garuda Indonesia, Philippine Airlines, Singapore Airlines, Thai Airways International, Air Caledonia International (Aircalin), Finnair, ANA Cargo, China Airlines Cargo, Nippon Cargo Airlines, United Parcel Service.
- Release Date: June 24, 2016
- Version: 1.13 (patch from official website)
- Like ATC 3: Kansai Crossover, player can control airspace of Kobe Airport and Osaka Airport as well.
- Special events: In Stage 9, a plane diverts to Kansai International Airport due to exceedence of Osaka Airport curfew caused by severe delay of the flight. In the Airshop stage, a TechnoBrain Airlines plane enters the wrong taxiway after exiting runway and stops ahead of another TechnoBrain Airlines plane heading towards it on the same taxiway.
- Now player can change the runway right after the flight asks for push back, changes landing runway after first clearance and also chooses which taxiway player wants the landing aircraft to get off.

=== RJFF - Fukuoka ===
- Airport: Fukuoka International Airport
- Airlines: JAL Group, All Nippon Airways, ANA Wings, Skymark Airlines, StarFlyer, Peach Aviation, Jetstar Japan, Fuji Dream Airlines, Amakusa Airlines, Oriental Air Bridge, Air Busan, Asiana Airlines, Jeju Air, Cathay Pacific Airways, Cathay Dragon, China Airlines, EVA Airways, Singapore Airlines, Thai Airways International, Finnair.
- Release Date: January 20, 2017 (PC), June 13, 2018 (Android and iOS)
- Version: 1.02 (patch from official website)
- Sounds of engines were remade from this installment onward to be more realistic.
- The approach system was revamped to allow more freedom for routes of approaching airplanes.
- Special events: One part of taxiway will be closed in Stage 3 due to a departure TBA plane suffering from engine failure when taxi to the runway. A typhoon approaches during Stage 6 and the runway will be closed near the end of the stage. In Stage 7, there are several delayed flights (due to typhoon in previous stage) that need to land quickly, and a TBA plane request emergency landing due to minimum fuel operation.

=== RJFF - Challenge ===
- Airport: Fukuoka International Airport
- Airlines: JAL Group, All Nippon Airways.
- Release Date: July 20, 2017
- Based on RJFF - Fukuoka, this installment is meant to be an introduction to the game, featuring only 6 "challenge" stages.

=== RJTT2 - Haneda 2 ===
- Airport: Tokyo International Airport
- Airlines: JAL Group, All Nippon Airways, Air Do, Skymark Airlines, StarFlyer Airlines, Solaseed Air, Peach Aviation, Asiana Airlines, China Airlines, Cathay Pacific Airways, Cathay Dragon, China Southern Airlines, Garuda Indonesia, Philippine Airlines, Singapore Airlines, Thai Airways International.
- Release Date: February 22, 2018 (PC), March 22, 2018 (Android and iOS)
- Version: 1.11 (patch from official website)
- Features enhanced graphics and "fixed-view" camera.
- Airbus A350-900 and Airbus A321 were added.
- China Southern Airlines was added.
- EVA Air was removed.
- Highway visual approach for Runway 34R is added (but only limited to planes requesting it to make up for delays)
- Business jets appear for the first time in Air Traffic Controller 4
- Japanese Air Force One Boeing 747-400 makes appearance in Stage 5 and 6 and the player will be tasked to ensure its timely arrival and departure.
- From this installment onward, all TechnoBrain Airlines planes in airport schedule stages will have different accents of pilot voices based on their destinations. The same also applies for the TechnoBrain Airlines planes in the main stages of this installment.

=== RJGG - Centrair ===
- Airport: Chubu Centrair International Airport
- Airlines: JAL Group, All Nippon Airways, ANA Wings, Skymark Airlines, Air Do, Jetstar Japan, Starflyer Airlines, Solaseed Air, AirAsia Japan, Asiana Airlines, China Airlines, Tigerair Taiwan, Cathay Pacific Airways, China Southern Airlines, Philippine Airlines, Singapore Airlines, Thai Airways International, Finnair, ANA Cargo.
- Release Date: June 28, 2018 (PC), July 26, 2018 (Android and iOS)
- Version: 1.10 (patch from official website)
- Boeing 747 Large Cargo Freighter appeared for the first time in Air Traffic Controller 4. It was operated by TechnoBrain Airlines (i.e. TechnoCarrier). On some stages, the player can view this plane via a special tour bus view.
- AirAsia Japan and Tigerair Taiwan were added.
- Runway tour view point (based on the real world runway tour at Chubu Centrair International Airport) was added for the first time in the Air Traffic Controller series.
- This installment emphasizes the importance of air traffic controller's judgement skills. As such, the player should be prepared for special events such as touch-and-go training, bird sweeping and runway check.
- This installment also reverts the pilot voices of TechnoBrain Airlines planes in the main stages back to Japanese accents only (except Boeing 747 Large Cargo Freighter).

=== RJTT2 Haneda 2 Extend Scenario 1 ===
- Airport: Tokyo International Airport (RJTT2 - Haneda 2)
- Airlines: JAL Group, All Nippon Airways, Air Do, Skymark Airlines, StarFlyer Airlines, Solaseed Air, Asiana Airlines, China Airlines, China Southern Airlines, Garuda Indonesia, Philippine Airlines, Singapore Airlines, Thai Airways International.
- Release Date: September 26, 2018 (PC), August 22, 2019 (Android and iOS)
- This package consists of 3 stages. Dedicated to experts, all stages are very difficult and are described as "puzzle stages". Stage 1 focuses on Terminal 1 and stage 2 shifts the focus to terminal 2 while stage 3 is centered around the International Terminal.
- The new approach routes for Runway 16L and 16R, proposed to accommodate more flights ahead of the 2020 Summer Olympics, are simulated in stage 1 by two TechnoBrain Airlines checker planes.

=== RJGG Centrair Extend Scenario 1 ===
- Airport: Chubu Centrair International Airport
- Airlines: JAL Group, All Nippon Airways, ANA Wings, Skymark Airlines, Air Do, Jetstar Japan, Starflyer Airlines, Solaseed Air, AirAsia Japan, Asiana Airlines, China Airlines, Tigerair Taiwan, Cathay Pacific Airways, China Southern Airlines, Philippine Airlines, Singapore Airlines, Thai Airways International, Finnair, ANA Cargo.
- Release Date: April 17, 2019 (PC), August 22, 2019 (Android and iOS)
- This package consists of 3 stages, each based on one of the following extreme weather conditions: strong crosswind, fog and rainstorm.

=== ROAH - Naha ===
- Airport: Naha Airport
- Airlines: JAL Group, All Nippon Airways, ANA Wings, Skymark Airlines, Solaseed Air, Starflyer Airlines, Peach Aviation, Jetstar Japan, Asiana Airlines, Jin Air, T'way Airlines, China Airlines, Tigerair Taiwan, EVA Air, Hong Kong Airlines, ANA Cargo.
- Release Date: December 12, 2019 (PC), January 30, 2020 (Android and iOS)
- Features the 2nd runway, the new control tower, the new international terminal, the new building connecting the domestic and international terminals and the new cargo terminal (previously featured in ES5 of Air Traffic Controller 3). A water salute is given to the first TechnoBrain Airlines plane that uses the 2nd runway in stage 1.
- EVA Air returns after being absent from Tokyo Haneda 2 and Nagoya Centrair versions, flying Airbus A321 jets.
- This is the first installment in the series that simulates the overhead approach of the F-15J, as well as the first in Air Traffic Controller 4 featuring special liveries from the onset with the two 'Jinbei' versions of JTA Boeing 737-800s, namely the 'Jinbei Jet' and 'Sakura Jinbei' variants.
- Foreign language cabin announcement returns from this installment onward with Korean and Taiwanese announcements returning since Air Traffic Controller 3 Kansai CrossOver and Narita World Wings respectively.
- Unlike the previous games, the player no longer has direct control over the United States Air Force and United States Navy planes using Kadena Air Base (although the player can still view those planes like other planes that they are in charge of).
- Scrambling events of Japan Air Self-Defense Force aircraft return after being omitted in Air Traffic Controller 3.

=== RJCC - New Chitose ===
- Airport: New Chitose Airport
- Airlines: JAL Group, All Nippon Airways, Ibex Airlines, Skymark Airlines, AirAsia Japan, Air Do, Jetstar Japan, Peach Aviation, Fuji Dream Airlines, AirAsia X, Thai AirAsia X, Aurora, Jin Air, Scoot, Thai Airways International, China Airlines, China Southern Airlines, Philippine Airlines, Finnair, Hong Kong Airlines
- Release Date: July 21, 2020 (PC), August 27, 2020 (Android & iOS)
- Features a new international terminal which previously appeared in ES4 for ATC3 as well as a new interconnecting taxiway between two parallel runways at the southern end of the terminal area.
- AirAsia X made its return debut into the series after its first and only appearance in ATC3 RJTTD - Tokyo Dream Gateway. Ibex Airlines also returns after its last appearance in ATC3 RJGG - Chubu Centrair International Airport.
- Japanese Air Force One Boeing 777-300ER made its first appearance into the series.
- Special events: Certain stages will be set in winter where snow sweeping is necessary. Heavy fog will result in closure of Runway 19L in Stage 4. In Stage 8, a plane will be stuck in heavy snow, resulting in closure of taxiway.

=== RJTT2 - Haneda 2 (English Release) ===
- Airport: Tokyo International Airport
- Release Date: October 15, 2020 (PC, Steam)
- All airlines from the Japanese release were replaced with generic colored ones (e.g. Red Airlines, Blue Airways, White Airlines etc.) to prevent copyright issues.
- First ever Steam release for the franchise.

=== RJOO - Itami ===
- Airport: Osaka International Airport
- Airlines: JAL Group, All Nippon Airways, Ibex Airlines, Amakusa Airlines
- Release Date: April 22, 2021 (PC)
- Japanese Air Force One and United States Air Force One make appearance in Stage 4 to 9, but only controllable in Stage 4 and 9 while parked in the airport at other stages.
- Special Events: Stage 5 require a runway check due to preventing possible bird strike. Stage 6 have several delayed flights that need to catch up before the airport closure in night curfew, or these flight will have to divert to Kansai Airport. In Stage 7, a plane belongs to Ministry of Land, Infrastructure, Transport and Tourism will check the ILS system of the airport, and require several approach and go around to check. And at the end, there will be a TBA aircraft make an emergency stop on the taxiway in front of the B runway due to mechanic failure. In Stage 8 the flights have to taxi on B runway to taxi to A runway due to the incident on previous stage.

=== ROAH - Naha (English Release) ===
- Airport: Naha Airport
- Release Date: August 26, 2021 (PC, Steam)
- All airlines from the Japanese release were replaced with generic colored ones (e.g. Red Airlines, Blue Airways, White Airlines, etc.) to prevent copyright issues.

=== RJTT2 Haneda 2 Extend Scenario 2 ===
- Airport: Tokyo International Airport (RJTT2 - Haneda 2)
- Airlines: JAL Group, All Nippon Airways, Air Do, Skymark Airlines, StarFlyer Airlines, Solaseed Air, Asiana Airlines, China Airlines, China Southern Airlines, Garuda Indonesia, Philippine Airlines, Singapore Airlines, Thai Airways International.
- Release Date: September 16, 2021 (PC), October 14, 2021 (Android & iOS)
- This package consists of 3 stages, each featuring events such as nightly ground movements, aircraft towing training, and wind change. Three additional "extra stages" follow up with taxiway maintenance closures.

=== RJSS - Sendai ===
- Airport: Sendai Airport
- Airlines: JAL Group, All Nippon Airways, Peach Aviation, Ibex Airlines, Asiana Airlines, Air Do, EVA Air, Skymark Airlines, Tigerair Taiwan, Thai Airways International, Fuji Dream Airlines, Civil Aviation College
- Release Date: January 20, 2022 (PC), February 2, 2022 (Android & iOS)
- All stages feature at least one Civil Aviation College aircraft undertaking flight training, culminating in a final instrument rating exam in Stage 9.

=== ROAH Naha Extend Scenario 1 ===
- Airport: Naha Airport
- Airlines: JAL Group, All Nippon Airways, ANA Wings, Skymark Airlines, Solaseed Air, Starflyer Airlines, Peach Aviation, Jetstar Japan, Jetstar Asia Airways, Jin Air, T'way Airlines, China Airlines, Tigerair Taiwan, EVA Air, Hong Kong Airlines, ANA Cargo.
- Release Date: August 5, 2022 (PC)
- This package consists of 2 stages themed around an emergency medical evacuation mission undertaken by Japan Maritime Self-Defense Force during a strong typhoon.

=== RJAA - Narita ===
- Airport: Narita International Airport
- Airlines: JAL Group, All Nippon Airways, Aeromexico, Aircalin, Garuda Indonesia, Cathay Pacific, Jetstar Japan, ZIPAIR Tokyo, Singapore Airlines, Spring Airlines Japan, Tigerair Taiwan, Thai Airways International, China Southern Airlines, Peach Aviation, Philippine Airlines, Finnair, Vietjet Air, ANA Cargo, Nippon Cargo Airlines, UPS Airlines.
- Release Date: November 17, 2022 (PC)

== Airport Hero for PSP ==
Developed by Sonic Powered and TechnoBrain exclusively for PSP, all games have two modes of play. The main mode is operation mode, where there are two stages for easy, medium and hard difficulty. The second mode is challenge mode where players will face special situations. The airlines in the game are fictional. There is also an airline named after the developer Sonic Powered called Air Sonic. The games are:

=== Boku wa Koukuu Kanseikan: Airport Hero Narita ===
- Release date: June 15, 2006
- Airport: Narita International Airport

Players direct planes from and to international airports including JFK International Airport, Frankfurt International Airport, and Heathrow International Airport. There are also domestic flights. It includes an encyclopedia explaining the equipment and personnel in an airport plus the type of airplanes in the game. An Airbus Beluga makes an appearance in Operation 6.

=== Boku wa Koukuu Kanseikan: Airport Hero Naha ===
- Release Date: September 28, 2006
- Airport: Naha Airport

Players will not only direct commercial planes but also military jets, patrol planes and helicopters. Players also direct American military planes. It includes a gallery where players can unlock videos giving brief explanation of planes they control in the airport.

=== Boku wa Koukuu Kanseikan: Airport Hero Shin Chitose ===
- Release date: February 22, 2007
- Airport: New Chitose Airport

Players will control the new Chitose airport plus the Chitose Air Base. Also includes scenarios during winter where runways will sometimes be covered in thick snow and need to be shut down for clearing. There is a replay option where players can choose to record gameplay for future viewing. A NAMC YS-11 makes an appearance in Operation 6.

=== Boku wa Koukuu Kanseikan: Airport Hero Haneda ===
- Release date (Japan): October 7, 2010
- Release date (NA): October 30, 2012
- Airport: Haneda Airport

Operation mode includes scenario from the old three runway airport and the new four runway airport. It has a replay mode similar to the Shin Chitose game.
Initially announced for North America as I am an Air Traffic Controller Airport Hero Haneda, the final release was slightly altered to I am an Air Traffic Controller Airport Hero Tokyo.

=== Boku wa Koukuu Kanseikan: Airport Hero Kanku ===
- Release date: December 9, 2010
- Airport: Kansai International Airport

This is the first game in the series to include night scenarios.

== Air Traffic Controller for Nintendo DS ==
Air Traffic Chaos was released in the United States by Majesco under the name Air Traffic Chaos. It has previously been released in Japan under the name ぼくは航空管制官 (I Am An Air Traffic Controller), and later in Europe under the title Air Traffic Controller by DS. A video game demo was made available before its release for the Wii's Nintendo Channel.

Air Traffic Chaos involves the player taking control of an airport control tower for a period. During this period the player needs to achieve a certain score based on orders given to planes and safe take offs and landings. The game has a total of 15 challenges.

The airports in Air Traffic Chaos are all five international and domestic Japanese airports. They are:

- Fukuoka Airport
- Kansai International Airport
- Chubu Centrair International Airport
- Tokyo International Airport
- New Chitose Airport

These each have three stages ranging from easy, medium and expert difficulty. Each stage increases in difficulty and brings with it a longer shift with more aircraft to safely land and depart.

There is no multiplayer gaming but players can share their results and badges records with up to seven other players through the ATC Library.

=== Reception ===
It was awarded Most Surprisingly Good Game in GameSpot's 2008 video games Special Achievement awards. It was also nominated for Best Game No One Played.

== Airport Hero for 3DS ==
Developed by Sonic Powered, the following Airport Hero games have been released on the Nintendo 3DS in Japan. Some of the titles have also been released in English in the US and Europe.

=== Boku wa Koukuu Kanseikan: Airport Hero 3D Haneda with JAL ===
- Release date: May 24, 2012
- Airport: Haneda Airport

=== Boku wa Koukuu Kanseikan: Airport Hero 3D Honolulu ===
- Release date (Japan): August 23, 2012
- Release date (NA): March 27, 2014
- Release date (Europe): June 8, 2017
- Airport: Honolulu International Airport

Known in North America and Europe as I am an Air Traffic Controller Airport Hero Hawaii.

=== Boku wa Koukuu Kanseikan: Airport Hero 3D Narita with ANA ===
- Release date (Japan): December 20, 2012
- Release date (NA): July 16, 2015
- Release date (Europe): May 25, 2017
- Airport: Narita International Airport

Known in North America and Europe as I am an Air Traffic Controller Airport Hero Narita with references to ANA (All Nippon Airways) replaced by the fictional APA (All Japan Airways).

=== Boku wa Koukuu Kanseikan: Airport Hero 3D Naha Premium ===
- Release date: August 8, 2013
- Airport: Naha Airport

=== Boku wa Koukuu Kanseikan: Airport Hero 3D Shin Chitose with JAL ===
- Release date: December 19, 2013
- Airport: New Chitose Airport

=== Boku wa Koukuu Kanseikan: Airport Hero 3D Kankuu Sky Story ===
- Release date (Japan): September 4, 2014
- Release date (NA): June 15, 2017
- Airport: Kansai International Airport

Known in North America as I am an Air Traffic Controller Airport Hero Osaka-KIX.

=== Boku wa Koukuu Kanseikan: Airport Hero 3D Narita All Stars ===
- Release date: December 25, 2014
- Airport: Narita International Airport

=== Boku wa Koukuu Kanseikan: Airport Hero 3D Haneda All Stars ===
- Release date: April 30, 2015
- Airport: Haneda Airport

=== Boku wa Koukuu Kanseikan: Airport Hero 3D Kansai All Stars ===
- Release date: December 17, 2015
- Airport: Kansai International Airport
