= Robert Ludlum's The Bourne Conspiracy =

2008 video game

- Developer: High Moon Studios
- Publisher: Vivendi Games (Note: Released under the Sierra Entertainment brand name)
- Director: Emmanuel Valdez
- Designer: Daniel Badilla
- Composer: Paul Oakenfold
- Engine: Unreal Engine 3
- Platforms: PlayStation 3, Xbox 360
- Release: NA: June 3, 2008; AU: June 5, 2008; EU: June 27, 2008
- Genres: Action, third-person shooter, stealth
- Mode: Single-player

Robert Ludlum's The Bourne Conspiracy is a third-person action video game developed by High Moon Studios and published by Vivendi Games for the PlayStation 3 and Xbox 360. The game expands upon Robert Ludlum's character Jason Bourne. The game was released in North America on June 3, June 5 in Australia and June 27, 2008, in Europe. It received mixed to positive reviews.

== Gameplay ==
Robert Ludlum's The Bourne Conspiracy mostly derives from the film version of The Bourne Identity. Although the game does not use the likeness of Matt Damon who portrays Bourne in the films (due to creative differences with the actor who initially wanted the gameplay to be more similar to that of Myst instead of a shooter), it aligns closer to the film storyline than that of the novels, and features musical themes from the films by John Powell.

As in the movie, the player character begins as an amnesiac found off the coast of Marseille, but as the game progresses, the player is provided with more clues to Bourne's true identity.

Jason Bourne's senses are an important part of surviving the game, with noteworthy items or locations highlighted—when a switch to this sense is triggered, the visual style changes, with important elements much brighter. A third-person espionage action game, the player encounters armed and unarmed combat, the latter usually resolved through quick time events, and at one point, a driving section, also often dependent on quick time events.

There are three difficulty settings which the player can choose from when playing the single-player campaign: Trainee (easy mode), Agent (normal mode) and Assassin (hard mode).

The game also contains a boss battle feature, allowing the player to fight the boss without having to complete the entire level again, although some boss fights last entire levels. The game also contains a music player feature that allows the player to listen to music from the game. It includes an original song for the game, "Falling", written by Paul Oakenfold and performed by Cee-Lo Green.

== Plot ==
The game takes place prior to, and during the events of, the first film. In addition to scenes from the film, several chapters also reveal some of Jason's backstory and missions that take place prior to the beginning of the game.

It begins with Jason Bourne, the protagonist, trying to assassinate African dictator Nykwana Wombosi, who has threatened to reveal details of the CIA's clandestine activities in Africa. After fighting his way through several guards and mercenaries, including Wombosi's lieutenant Solomon and his assassin O'Connor, he confronts Wombosi, but is unable to kill him because Wombosi's children are present. Bourne is shot in the back as he staggers out onto the deck of the boat and falls into the sea.

Bourne survives and is rescued by fishermen in the Mediterranean Sea, and then makes his way to Zurich. The city triggers a memory of a previous mission to kill terrorist leader Ivan Divandelen who is arriving at Zurich Airport under police escort. Terrorists seize control of the airport as Bourne pursues the target onto a cargo plane, where he parachutes to safety after defeating Divandelen in a fight.

In the present day, Bourne arrives at a Swiss bank, where he keeps a safety deposit box full of money and passports—along with a semi-automatic pistol he leaves in the box. On his way out, the police attempt to arrest him, but he escapes to the American consulate. There, the Marines attempt to detain him. He escapes from the consulate, then offers Marie Kreutz, whom he meets outside, a large sum of money to drive him to his Paris apartment.

Once at Bourne's apartment, a Lithuanian passport in his bag triggers a second flashback to a sniper mission to kill a former army general giving a speech at Vilnius University.

Marie accidentally triggers a silent alarm by picking up the phone. Treadstone sends an assassin (Castel) to kill Bourne, but Bourne subdues him after a lengthy fight of using fists and non-conventional weapons. The assassin then throws himself out the window to avoid interrogation. Bourne and Marie escape from the Paris police, who were alerted after the assassin killed himself.

Checking into a Paris hotel, Bourne has a third flashback to a mission in the city to eliminate an arms dealer called Charles Renard at an art museum. Bourne watches as Renard is killed by his client, Khalid Azar, who takes a dirty bomb he was buying from him. Bourne pursues Azar and shoots his helicopter down.

Bourne and Marie travel to her friend Eamon's house in the countryside and spend the night there, but before they can leave the next morning, they are attacked by another assassin (the Professor) using a sniper rifle from the surrounding hills. Arming himself with a double-barreled shotgun, Bourne blows up fuel tanks to create cover and makes his way into the hills where he fires several shots to force the sniper into a barn. Inside the barn, Bourne and the Professor have a brief firefight that ends with a fist fight as the barn catches fire. Bourne stabs the assassin to death with a sharpened piece of wood, then sends Marie away as he returns to Paris to confront Treadstone.

In Paris, Bourne warns his former boss, Alexander Conklin, to leave him alone. Instead, Conklin escapes and has several dozen agents attack Bourne. He incapacitates the agents through various means as he makes his way down out of the building and into the streets, then pursues Conklin into an alley. As they struggle, another assassin (Manheim) appears and shoots Conklin. Bourne pursues the assassin into a church undergoing construction and a brief gunfight occurs before an explosion knocks the assassin off balance, allowing Bourne to tackle him into the graveyard behind the church. Bourne is almost strangled to death but uses a shovel as a club to send the assassin over a rock face, breaking his neck. The game ends in Greece, where Bourne and Marie are reunited in the shop Marie has opened—they embrace as the game fades out.

== Demo ==
The demo was released on Xbox Live on May 5 and PlayStation Network on May 8. There are three levels in the demo: the escape from the Zurich American Embassy, a past assassination on board an airplane, and a part of the Parisian car chase that was featured in The Bourne Identity. It was also released in the issue #85 on a playable disc that comes with the July 2008 issue of the Official Xbox Magazine.

== Reception ==
Reception

Aggregate score
Aggregator	Score	
Aggregator	PS3	Xbox 360
Metacritic	70/100	71/100

Review scores
Publication	Score	
Publication	PS3	Xbox 360
Destructoid	N/A	3/10
Edge	N/A	4/10
Eurogamer	N/A	5/10
Game Informer	6.75/10	6.75/10
GamePro	3.75/5	3.75/5
GameRevolution	B−	B−
GameSpot	8/10	8/10
GameSpy	N/A	4/5
GameTrailers	7.2/10	7.2/10
GameZone	8/10	8/10
Giant Bomb	3/5	3/5
IGN	7.3/10	(US) 7.5/10 (AU) 7.3/10
Official Xbox Magazine (US)	N/A	7.5/10
PlayStation: The Official Magazine	3/5	N/A

The game received "average" reviews on both platforms according to the review aggregation website Metacritic.

411Mania gave the Xbox 360 version a score of 6.8 out of 10 and called it "a fine game with a fun hand-to-hand combat system. Beyond that, it meets about the average requirements for a game in today's market – good sound, quality graphics and animation and a popular license. Unfortunately, the short lived campaign and lack of replay value hurt the game quite a bit. Regardless, it's worth a rental so pick it up and give it a try. The story of the book and movie are greatly overshadowed by the action sequences of the game which make for a fast pace and fun time, but if you have problems forgetting that Jason Bourne has amnesia – don't feel bad. It's not important anyway." Charles Herold of The New York Times similarly gave the game an average review, saying, "Toward the end, one character asks Bourne, 'If you kill me, who will tell you the truth?' I immediately thought, 'What truth?' Unlike the movie, the game completely fails to raise any curiosity about Bourne. Conspiracy is not about finding the truth, it's about getting from point A to point B without bleeding to death." Variety gave the Xbox 360 version a mixed review, saying, "Developer High Moon Studios did a phenomenal job capturing the look and feel of the "Bourne" books and movies—everything from the fighting moves to the camera work to the overall mood. But too many of the best moments are almost entirely out of players' control in this heavily scripted and disappointingly unresponsive game."

GameSpot nominated the game as one of the most surprisingly good games of 2008, but it lost to Air Traffic Chaos, a game for Nintendo DS, and "Best Boss Fights" where it lost to Metal Gear Solid 4.
