= From the Abyss =

2008 video game

- North American cover art
- Developer: Sonic Powered
- Publishers: JP: Sonic Powered; NA: Aksys Games; EU: Nobilis Publishing
- Composer: Tadashi Okada; Naoyoshi Yamamoto; Yuya Ogawa
- Platform: Nintendo DS
- Release: JP: January 17, 2008; NA: August 26, 2008; EU: March 20, 2009
- Genre: Role-playing video game
- Modes: Single-player, multiplayer

From the Abyss (フロム・ジ・アビス, Furomu ji Abisu) is a dungeon crawling role-playing video game. It was developed and published by Sonic Powered for the Nintendo DS on January 17, 2008 in Japan, and by Aksys Games on August 26, 2008 in North America.

== Gameplay ==
In From the Abyss, players control an adventurer in the land of Rubenhaut. Rubenhaut was a peace-loving country, ruled by queens until a dimensional gate the queens had used to seal away evil was broken. Rubenhaut's armies were incapable of fighting off the evil demons and now it is up to the player to seal them away once more.

From the Abyss sends players into randomized dungeons to fight monsters and collect items. Dungeons may be of a variety of themes such as fire and ice. A map is automatically drawn for the player as they progress through each dungeon, which itself is laid out on a grid. Single player and co-op modes are available but co-op does not allow the player to progress the story.

== Reception ==
Official reviews for From the Abyss have been critical of the gameplay. Criticisms include "monotonous dungeons" and a "simplistic plot". The average score on Metacritic is 59%, pooling reviews from 9 separate online sources.

== Anonymous Notes – From the Abyss ==
A sequel of the original game existing of four new chapters was released on DSiWare. Named Anonymous Notes – From the Abyss, chapter one to three are 200 points each and the final chapter is 500 points. The first two chapters were released in 2010 in Japan and 2011 in the US and Europe, following a third and fourth chapter releasing in 2012 and 2014 respectively. These chapters follow the same game logic as its precedent of randomly generated dungeons to explore and a similar gameplay. All items gained during quests are interchangeable between the four chapters.
