= Traffic pattern indicator =

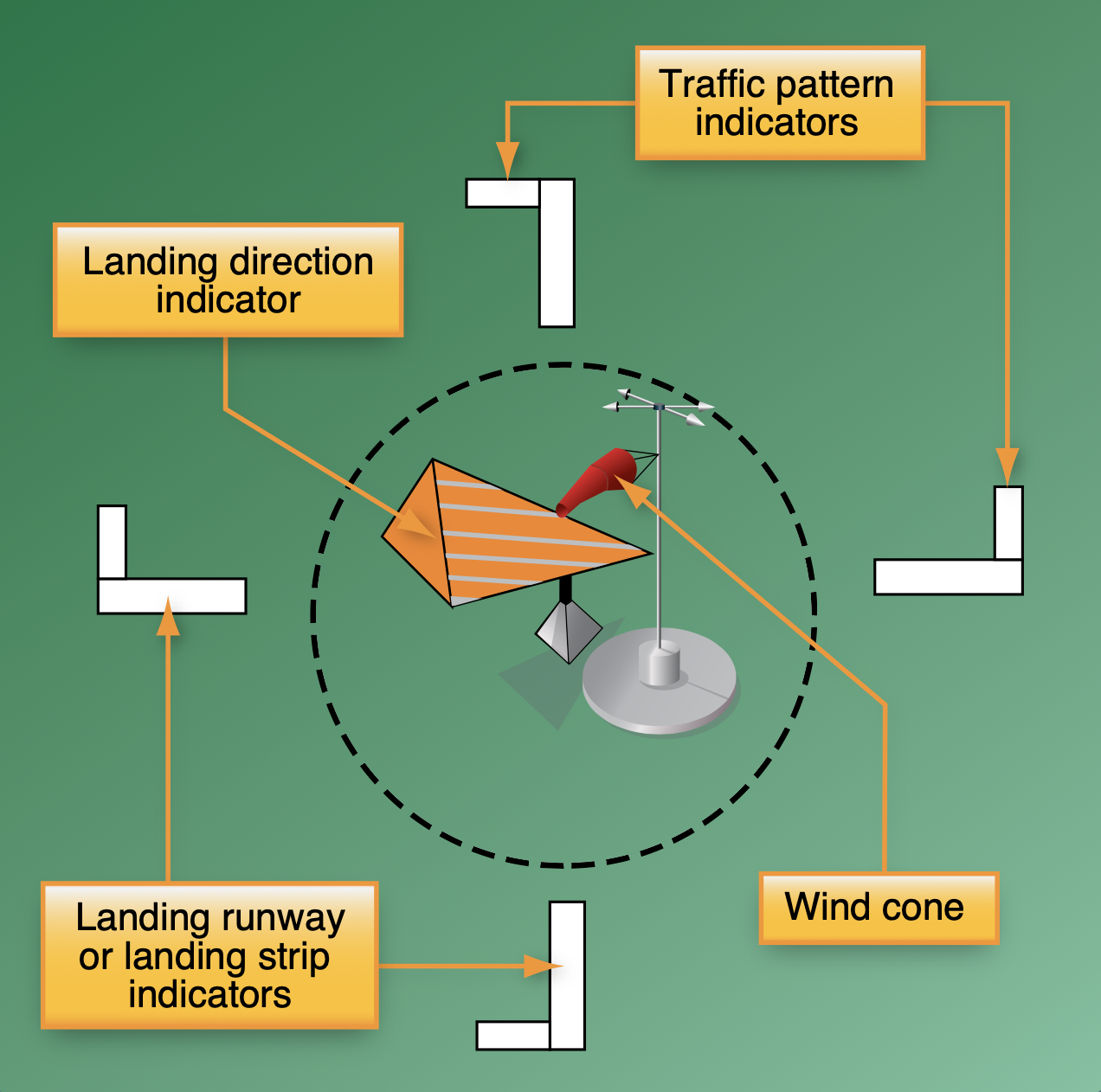
L-shaped traffic pattern indicators are part of the segmented circle, a visual indicator system designed to provide traffic pattern information.

In aviation, a traffic pattern indicator is an L-shaped device which show the airfield traffic pattern to the in-flight aircraft over an aerodrome. The short arm of the "L" represents the base leg, and the long arm the final approach. If no segmented circle is installed, traffic pattern indicators may be installed on or near runway ends.
