= Sonic Powered =

Japanese video game developer

Sonic Powered Co., Ltd.
- Native name: 株式会社ソニックパワード
- Romanized name: Kabushiki gaisha Sonikku Pawādo
- Type: Kabushiki gaisha
- Industry: Video games
- Founded: April 1, 1998
- Headquarters: Nagoya, Aichi, Japan
- Key people: Kiyoshi Ohkawa (President & CEO)
- Number of employees: 70
- Website: www.sonicpowered.co.jp

Sonic Powered Co., Ltd. is a Japanese software development company based in Nagoya, Aichi Prefecture. It mainly focuses on mobile and console games, and software for business purposes.

== History ==
Sonic Powered was first formed in the Nagoya on February 14, 1995, and incorporated on April 1, 1998. The company was developing games such as Tetris and Space invaders for Sharp Zaurus, a PDA of Japanese brand Sharp.

In 2006, the company started developing simulation games such as “I am an Air Traffic Controller Airport Hero” (for PSP and later for 3DS), and later Japanese Rail Sim 3D for 3DS. The Japanese Rail Sim series uses real-life footage of Japanese railways. Some of their games have been localized outside of Japan, including games in the Airport Hero and Japanese Rail Sim series.

== Video games ==
Games only in Japanese:

- Moomin-Dani no Okurimono (2009, Nintendo DS)
- Boku wa Koukuu Kanseikan: Airport Hero Naha (2010, PlayStation Portable)
- Boku wa Koukuu Kanseikan: Airport Hero Shinchitose (2010, PlayStation Portable)
- Boku wa Koukuu Kanseikan: Airport Hero Kankuu (2010, PlayStation Portable)
- Akumu no Youkai Mura (2011, Nintendo DS)
- @field (2012, PlayStation Vita)
- Boku wa Koukuu Kanseikan: Airport Hero 3D Haneda with JAL (2012, Nintendo 3DS)
- Kira*Meki Oshare Salon! Watashi no Shigoto wa Biyoushi-San (2013, Nintendo 3DS)
- Boku wa Koukuu Kanseikan: Airport Hero 3D - Naha Premium (2013, Nintendo 3DS)
- Boku wa Koukuu Kanseikan: Airport Hero 3D - Shin Chitose with JAL (2013, Nintendo 3DS)
- Gakki de Asobo: Tanoshii Douyou(1) (Nintendo 3DS, 2014)
- Gakki de Asobo: Tanoshii Douyou(2) (Nintendo 3DS, 2014)
- Gakki de Asobo: Tanoshii Douyou(3) (Nintendo 3DS, 2014)
- Boku wa Koukuu Kanseikan: Airport Hero 3D - Haneda All Stars (2015, Nintendo 3DS)
- Tetsudou Nippon! Rosen Tabi: Oumi Tetsudou-hen (2015, Nintendo 3DS)
- Tetsudou Nippon! Rosen Tabi: Joumou Denki Tetsudou-hen (2015, Nintendo 3DS)
- Boku wa Koukuu Kanseikan: Airport Hero 3D - Kankuu All Stars (2015, Nintendo 3DS)
- Tetsudou Nippon! Rosen Tabi: Kikansha Thomas-hen Oigawa Tetsudou wo Hashirou! (2016, Nintendo 3DS)
- Tetsudou Nippon! Rosen Tabi: Aizu Tetsudou-hen (2016, Nintendo 3DS)
- Boku wa Koukuu Kanseikan: Airport Hero 3D - Narita / Haneda All Stars Pack (2017, Nintendo 3DS)
- Tetsudou Nippon! Rosen Tabi: Jouge-sen Shuuroku Double Pack (2017, Nintendo 3DS)
- Waku Waku Sweets: Amai Okashi ga Dekiru kana? (2018, Nintendo Switch)
- Akumu no yōkai-mura (2021, Switch)
- Sansuu dorirā (2021, Switch)
- Tetsudō Nippon! Rosen tabi sangitetsudō-hen (2021, Nintendo Switch)
- Tetsudō Nippon! Rosen tabi meichi tetsudō-hen (2022, Nintendo Switch) (Mascon compatible)
- Tetsudō Nippon! Real Pro tokkyū sōkō! Nagoyatetsudō-hen (2022, Nintendo Switch, PC(Steam)) (Mascon compatible)
- Tetsudō Nippon! Rosen tabi EX seiryū unten Nagaragawa tetsudō-hen (2023, Nintendo Switch) (Mascon compatible)
- Tetsudō Nippon! Real Pro True Romance Car! Odakyu dentetsuhen (2023, Nintendo Switch) (Mascon compatible)
- Tetsudō Nippon! Memoriaru JR Tokai Kiha 85 Tokkyu Nankihen (2024, Nintendo Switch) (Mascon compatible)
- Tetsudō Nippon! RealPro Tōkyō - Kanagawa! Tōkyū dentetsu-hen (2025, Nintendo Switch) (Mascon compatible)
- Tetsudō Nippon! RealPro chōkyori unten! Tokkyū hi no tori kinkinihontetsudō-hen (2025, Nintendo Switch) (Mascon compatible)

Games also released in other languages:

- Air Traffic Chaos (2007, Nintendo DS)
- MiniCopter: Adventure Flight (2007, Nintendo Wii)
- From the Abyss (2008, Nintendo DS)
- The Crush Star (2010, iPhone/iPad,)
- I am an Air Traffic Controller Airport Hero Tokyo (2010, PlayStation Portable)
- Anonymous Notes: Chapter 1 - From the Abyss (2011, Nintendo DSiWare)
- Anonymous Notes: Chapter 2 - From the Abyss (2011, Nintendo DSiWare)
- Anonymous Notes: Chapter 3 - From the Abyss (2012, Nintendo DSiWare)
- I am an Air Traffic Controller Airport Hero Hawaii (2012, Nintendo 3DS)
- Anonymous Notes: Chapter 4 - From the Abyss (2014, Nintendo DSiWare)
- SKYPEACE (2014. Nintendo 3DS)
- I am an air traffic controller: Airport Hero - Osaka-KIX (2014, Nintendo 3DS)
- Japanese Rail Sim 3D: Journey to Kyoto (2014, Nintendo 3DS)
- I am an Air Traffic Controller: Airport Hero Narita (2014, Nintendo 3DS)
- Japanese Rail Sim 3D: Journey in Suburbs #1 (2015, Nintendo 3DS)
- Japanese Rail Sim 3D: Monorail Trip to Okinawa (2015, Nintendo 3DS)
- Japanese Rail Sim 3D: Journey in Suburbs #1 Vol. 2 (2016, Nintendo 3DS)
- Japanese Rail Sim 3D: Journey in Suburbs #1 Vol. 3 (2016, Nintendo 3DS)
- Japanese Rail Sim 3D: Journey in Suburbs #1 Vol. 4 (2016, Nintendo 3DS)
- Japanese Rail Sim 3D: Journey in Suburbs #2 (2017, Nintendo 3DS)
- Japanese Rail Sim 3D: Travel of Steam (2017, Nintendo 3DS)
- Waku Waku Sweets: Happy Sweets Making (2018, Nintendo 3DS)
- SKYPEACE (2018, Nintendo Switch)
- Japanese Rail Sim 3D: 5 types of trains (2018, Nintendo 3DS)
- Japanese Rail Sim: Journey to Kyoto (2019, Nintendo Switch, PS4, PC(Steam))
- Actraiser Renaissance (2021, Switch, PS4, PC(Steam), iPhone, Android)
- Landing Hero: Haneda x 787 (2022, Switch)
- I am an Air Traffic Controller: Airport Hero Haneda - RJTT (2022, Switch, PS4)
- Reverse Room (2023, PC(Steam))
- Japanese Rail Sim: Hakone Town of Natural Beauty and Hot Springs (2024, Nintendo Switch, PC(Steam)) (Mascon compatible)

All Japanese Rail Sim games for Nintendo Switch since 2022, except for Journey to Kyoto, are compatible with Zuiki Mascon one-handle train controller.
