= Air Traffic Chaos =

2007 video game

- North American cover art
- Developer: Sonic Powered
- Publishers: JP: Interchannel; NA: Majesco; PAL: Ertain
- Platform: Nintendo DS
- Release: JP: February 22, 2007; NA: September 9, 2008; EU: June 12, 2009; AU: December 13, 2010
- Genre: Simulation game
- Mode: Single-player

Air Traffic Chaos is an air traffic controller simulation video game developed by Sonic Powered and published by Majesco for the Nintendo DS handheld video game console. It had previously been released in Japan under the name Boku wa Kōkū Kanseikan (ぼくは航空管制官; "I Am An Air Traffic Controller"), and it was released later in the PAL region under the title Air Traffic Controller by DS. A video game demo was made available before its release for the Wii's Nintendo Channel.

== Gameplay ==
Air Traffic Chaos involves the player serving the role of a air traffic controller at a control tower in a Japanese airport for a period of time. During this period the player needs to achieve a certain score based on orders given to planes and safe take offs and landings. The game has a total of 15 challenges. These each have 3 stages ranging from easy, medium and expert difficulty. Each stage increases in difficulty and brings with it a longer shift with more aircraft to safely land and depart. The player can share their results and badges records with up to 7 other players through the ATC Library. Players must work carefully to prevent pilots from being over-stressed from having to wait and avoid fatal collisions, which will end the current mission immediately and prematurely in failure without showing any impact from the latter.

== Reception ==
Reception

Aggregate score
| Aggregator | Score |
|---|---|
| Metacritic | 66/100 |

Review scores
| Publication | Score |
|---|---|
| 1Up.com | C+ |
| Eurogamer | 8/10 |
| Famitsu | 27/40 |
| GamePro | 2/5 |
| GameSpot | 8/10 |
| IGN | 6.9/10 |
| The A.V. Club | B |

The game received "average" reviews according to the review aggregation website Metacritic. In Japan, Famitsu gave it a score of one six and three sevens for a total of 27 out of 40.

It was awarded Most Surprisingly Good Game in GameSpot's Best of 2008 Special Achievements. They also nominated the game for Best Game No One Played in the Best of 2008 Dubious Honors.
