= Airfield traffic pattern =

Standard aircraft path

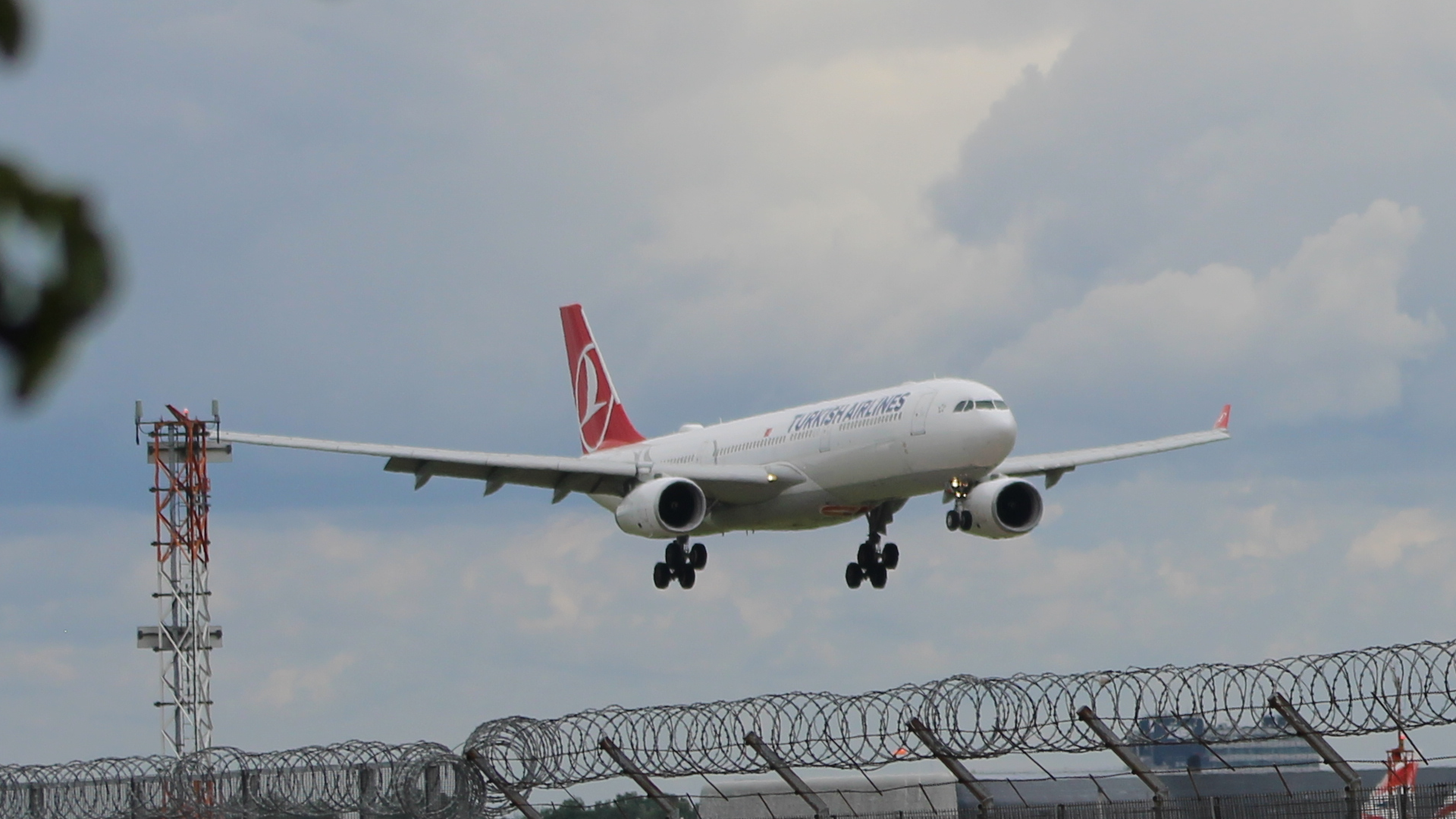
An Airbus A330-300 of Turkish Airlines on short final to Heathrow Airport, immediately before landing.

An airfield traffic pattern is a standard path followed by aircraft when taking off or landing while maintaining visual contact with the airfield.

At an airport, the pattern (or circuit) is a standard path for coordinating air traffic. It differs from "straight-in approaches" and "direct climb-outs" in that an aircraft using a traffic pattern remains close to the airport. Patterns are usually employed at small general aviation (GA) airfields and military airbases. A number of large controlled airports avoid the system unless there is GA activity as well as commercial flights. However, some kind of a pattern may be used at airports in some cases such as when an aircraft is required to go around, but this kind of pattern at controlled airports may be very different in form, shape, and purpose to the standard traffic pattern as used at GA airports.

The use of a pattern at airfields is for aviation safety. By using a consistent flight pattern, pilots will know from where to expect other air traffic and be able to see and avoid it. Pilots flying under visual flight rules (VFR) may not be separated by air traffic control, so this consistent predictable pattern is a vital way to keep things orderly. At tower-controlled airports, air traffic control (ATC) may provide traffic advisories for VFR flights on a work-load permitting basis.

== Wind direction ==
Pilots prefer to take off and land facing into the wind. This has the effect of reducing the aircraft's speed over the ground (for a given airspeed), thus reducing the length of runway required to perform either maneuver.

An exception to this rule is at airports where the runway is on a severe slope, such as alpine airports (altiports). In these instances, takeoffs are usually made downhill and landings uphill regardless of wind direction with the slope aiding in acceleration and deceleration. Another exception is at airports with mountains at one end.

Many airfields have runways facing a variety of directions. The purpose of this is to provide arriving aircraft with the best runway to land on according to the wind direction. Runway orientation is determined from historical data of the prevailing winds in the area. This is especially important for single-runway airports that do not have the option of a second runway pointed in an alternative direction. A common scenario is to have two runways arranged at or close to 90 degrees to one another, so that aircraft can always find a suitable runway. Almost all runways are reversible, and aircraft use whichever runway in whichever direction is best suited to the wind. In light and variable wind conditions, the direction of the runway in use might change several times during the day, or there may be a preferred “calm wind runway”, possibly because it’s longer.

== Layout ==
Standard traffic pattern. Fig. 4-3-2 from FAA AIM.

Components of a traffic pattern. Fig. 4-3-1 from FAA AIM.

Traffic patterns can be defined as left-hand or right-hand according to which way the turns in the pattern are performed. They are usually left-hand turns because most small airplanes are piloted from the left seat (or the senior pilot or pilot-in-command sits in the left seat), and so the pilot has better visibility out the left window. Right-hand patterns will be set up for parallel runways, for noise abatement, or because of ground features (such as terrain, towers, etc.). In the US, the non-standard (i.e. right-hand) patterns are noted in the Airport/Facilities Directory or on a sectional chart; in other countries they may be indicated in that nation's similar document, e.g. Canada Flight Supplement. Unless explicitly indicated otherwise, all traffic patterns at non-towered airports are to the left. The direction of the pattern may be indicated by a traffic pattern indicator in the aerodrome's signal square.

In the United States, the Code of Federal Regulations CFR 91.126 a. (2) requires helicopters to avoid the flow of fixed wing aircraft.

Because the active runway is chosen to meet the wind at the nearest angle (with take-offs and landings upwind), the pattern orientation also depends on wind direction. Patterns are typically rectangular in basic shape, and include the runway along one long side of the rectangle. Each leg of the pattern has a particular name:

- Upwind leg. A flight path parallel to and in the direction of the landing runway. It is offset from the runway and opposite the downwind leg.
- Crosswind leg. A short climbing flight path at right angles to the departure end of the runway.
- Downwind leg. A long level flight path parallel to but in the opposite direction of the landing runway. (Some consider it to have "sub-legs" of early, mid and late. Certainly a plane giving a position report of "mid-downwind" can be visually located easily.)
- Base leg. A short descending flight path at right angles to the approach end extended centerline of the landing runway.
- Final approach. A descending flight path in the direction of landing along the extended runway centerline from the base leg to the runway. The last section of the final approach is sometimes referred to as short final.
- Departure leg, Initial, or Climb out. The climbing flight path along the extended runway centerline which begins at takeoff and continues to at least 1/2 mile beyond the runway's departure end and not less than 300 feet below the traffic pattern altitude.

The names of the legs are logical and based on the relative wind as seen looking down a runway facing into the wind. An aircraft flying upwind heads into the wind, flying crosswind heads across the wind, flying downwind heads in the direction of the wind just like blown smoke.

While a number of airfields operate a completely standard pattern, in other cases it will be modified according to need. For example, military airfields often dispense with the crosswind and base legs, but rather fly these as circular arcs directly joining the upwind and downwind sections.

== Procedures in the pattern ==
Aircraft are expected to join and leave the pattern, following the pattern already in use. Sometimes this will be at the discretion of the pilot, while at other times the pilot will be directed by air traffic control.

Entering a traffic pattern in the United States

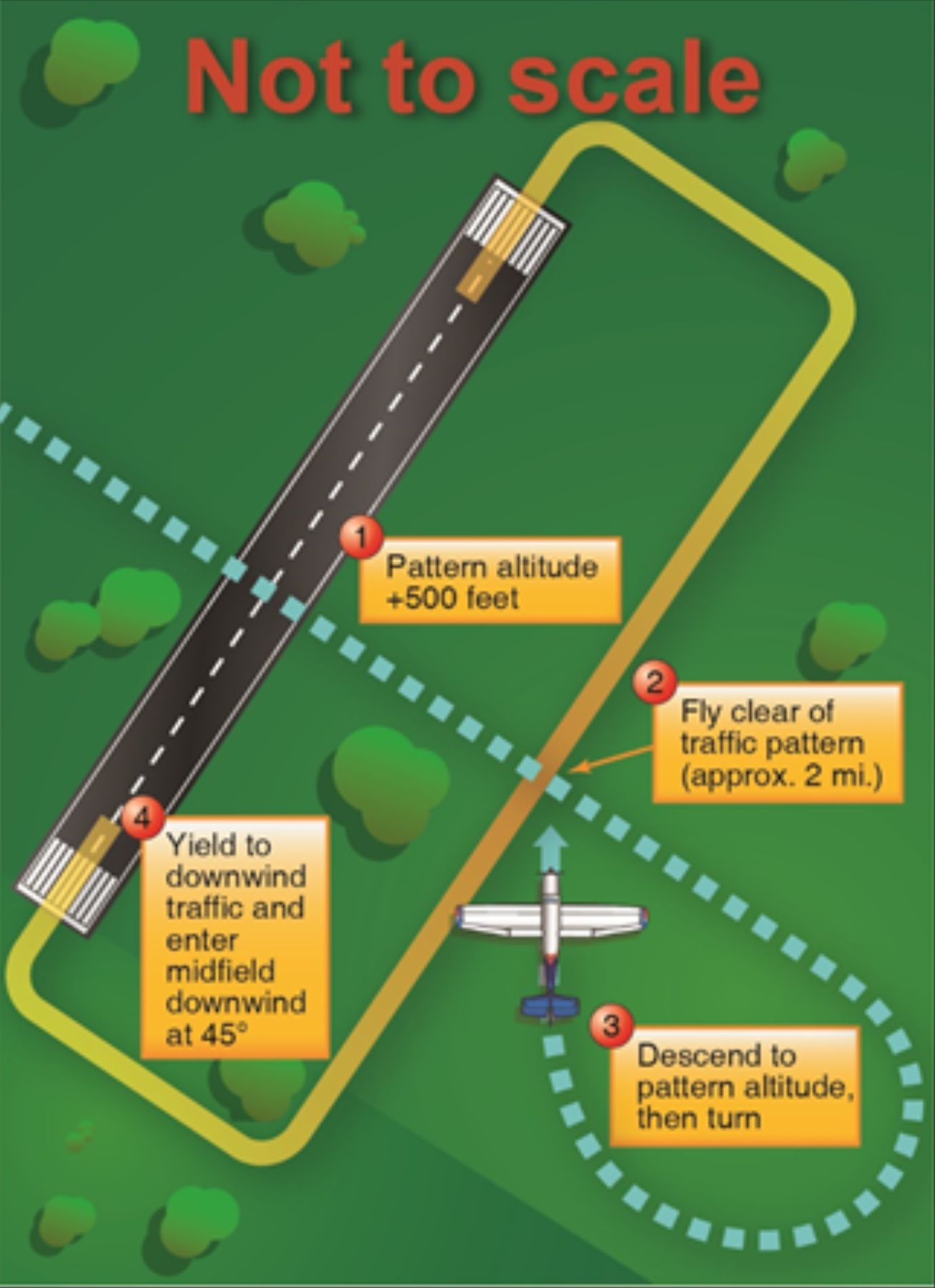
Preferred — Entry-Crossing Midfield

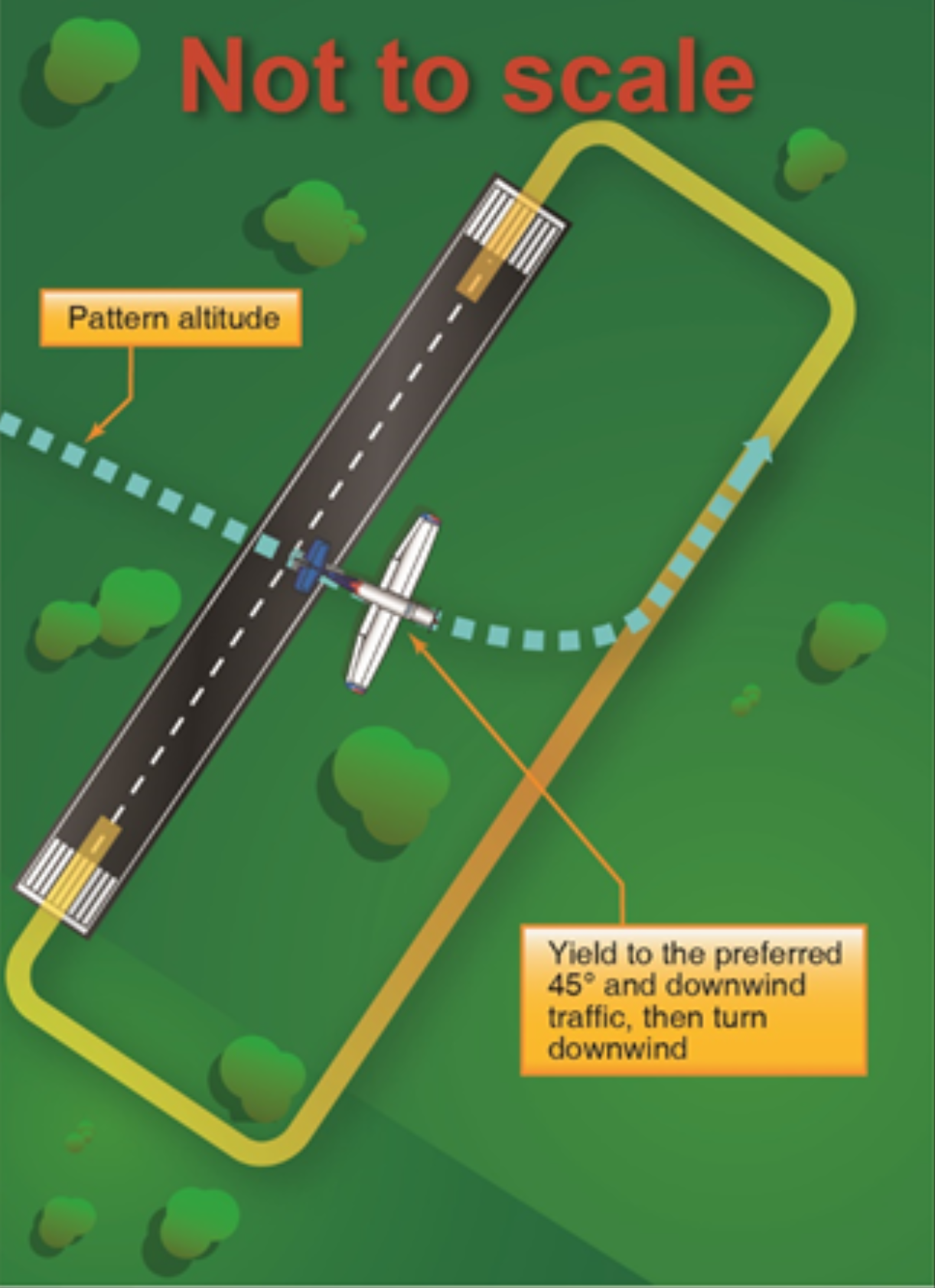
Alternative Midfield Entry, used only when the airfield is not busy.

The U.S. recommend entering a traffic pattern midfield when coming from the upwind leg side.

There are conventions for joining the pattern, used in different jurisdictions.

- In the United States, aircraft usually join the pattern at a 45° angle to the downwind leg and abeam midfield. Although aircraft may legally join the pattern at any point, the AIM and AC 90-66B strongly recommend using a 45° entry at pattern altitude.
- In Canada, aircraft at uncontrolled airports usually cross the airport at midfield at pattern altitude from the upwind side, turning onto the downwind leg. Although joining straight in downwind is also a possibility. At controlled airports, the tower typically directs aircraft to join the downwind leg, base leg, or straight into the final leg.
- In the UK, South Africa, and New Zealand an overhead join, in which aircraft cross above the circuit, before descending on the 'dead' side and joining the circuit on the crosswind leg is recommended.
- In Europe, aircraft usually join the pattern at a 45° angle to the downwind leg, in the beginning of the downwind leg.
- Fast aircraft, for example military jets, may enter the pattern with a run-and-break (in the US, overhead maneuver or overhead break). The aircraft flies at speed along the final leg, and makes a sharp, high-G turn above midfield to lose speed and arrive on the downwind leg at pattern altitude and in landing configuration.

Similarly, there are conventions for departing the pattern.

- In the United States, aircraft usually depart the pattern either straight out along the runway heading, with a 45° turn in the direction of (or against) the crosswind leg, downwind, or with a 45° turn away from downwind.
- In Canada, aircraft usually depart straight out along the runway heading until at circuit altitude, at which point they may turn as desired. At controlled airports, the tower typically gives instructions for what turn to make on departure.

There is also a procedure known as an "orbit", where an aircraft flies a 360° loop either clockwise or anticlockwise. This is usually to allow greater separation with other traffic ahead in the pattern. This can be the result of a controller's instruction. If at the pilot's initiative, the pilot will report e.g. "(tail number or flight number) making one left-hand orbit, will advise complete".

To practice take off and landing, a pilot would often fly multiple patterns, one after another, from the same runway. Upon each landing, depending on the runway distance remaining, aircraft and pilot capabilities, noise abatement procedures in effect, and air traffic control clearance, the pilot will perform either a full stop landing (taxi to the runway beginning for subsequent take-off), a touch-and-go (stabilize in the landing roll, reconfigure the aircraft for take-off, and take-off without ever stopping the aircraft), or a stop-and-go (decelerate to a stop, then take-off from the remaining runway). In the U.S., when operating in a controlled airport a pilot can be cleared for the option, allowing any of the landing options above, or a rejected landing, at pilot's discretion.

== Contra-rotating circuit patterns ==
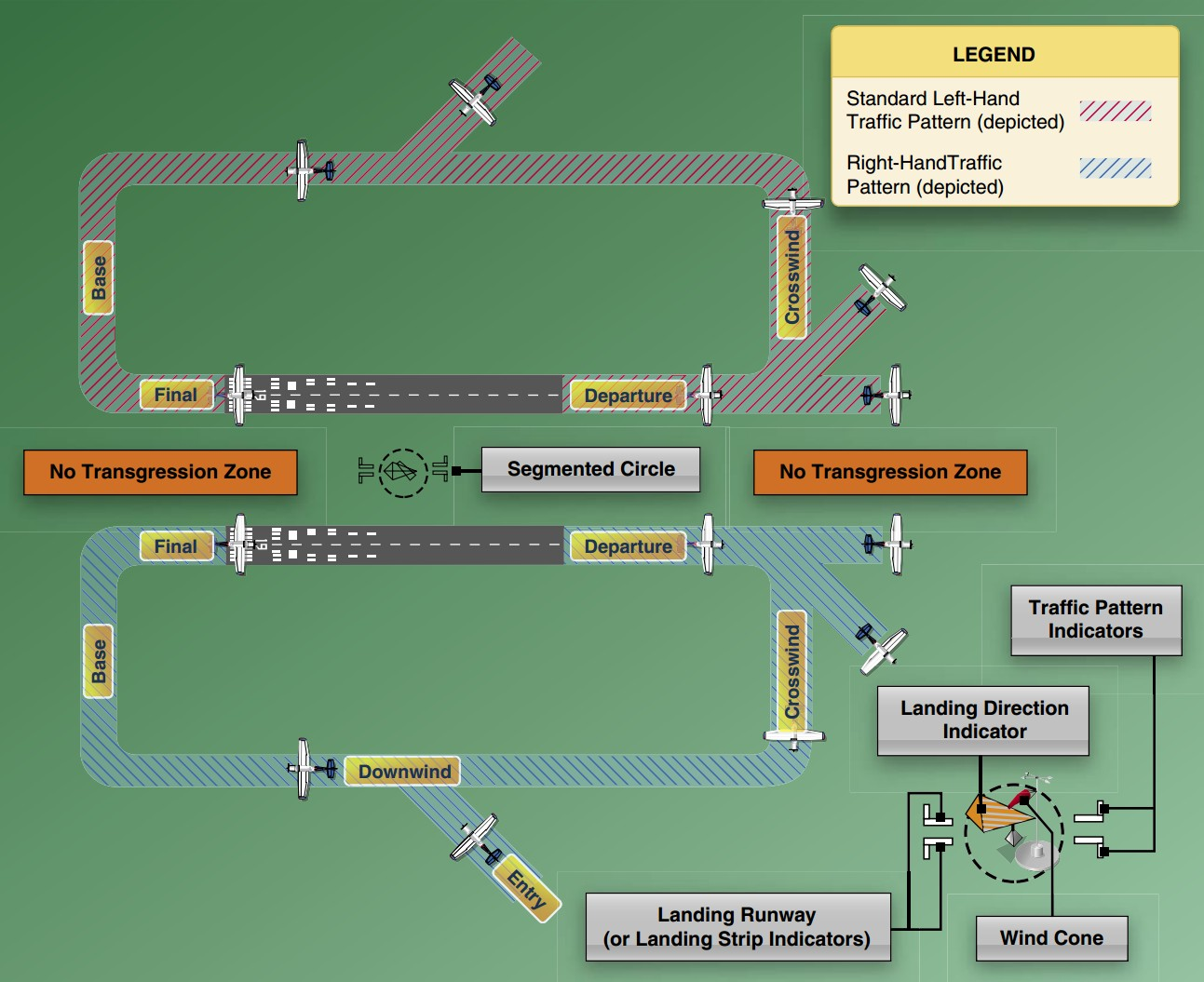
Left and right hand traffic patterns as depicted in the Pilot's Handbook of Aeronautical Knowledge issued by the Federal Aviation Administration in the United States of America.

In cases where two or more parallel runways are in operation concurrently, the aircraft operating on the outermost runways are required to perform their patterns in a direction which will not conflict with the other runways. Thus, one runway may be operating with a left-hand pattern direction and the other one will be operating with a right-hand pattern direction.

This allows aircraft to maintain maximum separation during their patterns, however it is important that the aircraft do not stray past the centerline of the runway when joining the final leg, so as to avoid potential collisions. If three or more parallel runways exist, as is the case at Bankstown Airport in Australia, then the middle runway(s) can, for obvious reasons, only be used when either a straight in approach is used or when the aircraft joins the pattern from a very wide base leg.

== Altitudes ==
An aerodrome publishes a "circuit height" or "pattern altitude", that is, a nominal level above the field at which pilots are required (recommended in the US, FAA AC90-66A Para. 8c) to fly while in the circuit. Unless otherwise specified, the standard recommended pattern height is 1000 ft AGL (above ground level), although a pattern height of 800 ft AGL is common. Helicopters usually fly the pattern at 500 ft AGL. Extreme caution must be exercised by pilots while flying at or through published traffic pattern altitudes as this might contribute to mid-air collisions.

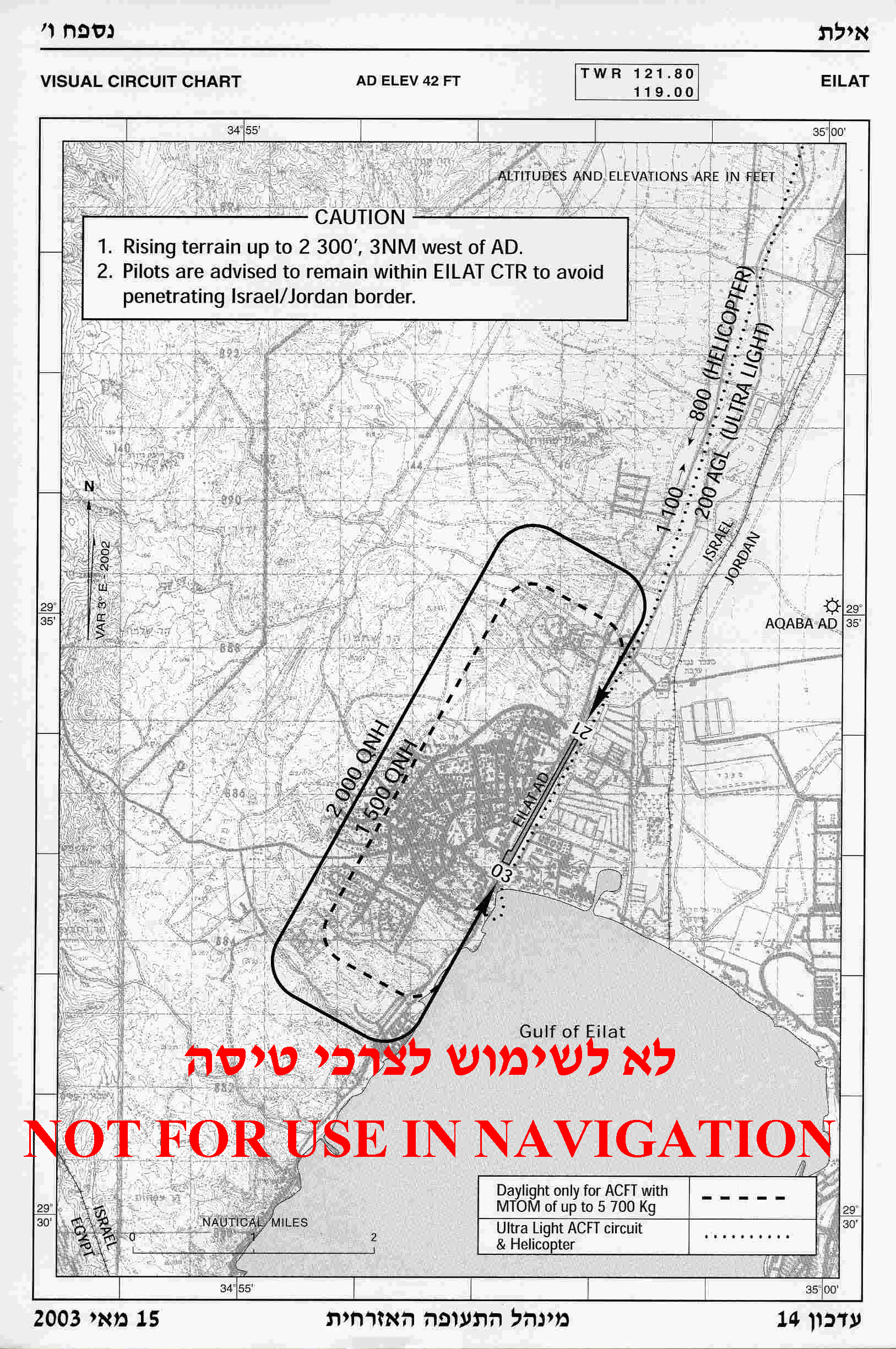
Traffic pattern of Eilat Airfield (Israel). Note different pattern altitudes for heavy aircraft and ultralights/helicopters

== Visual indicators ==
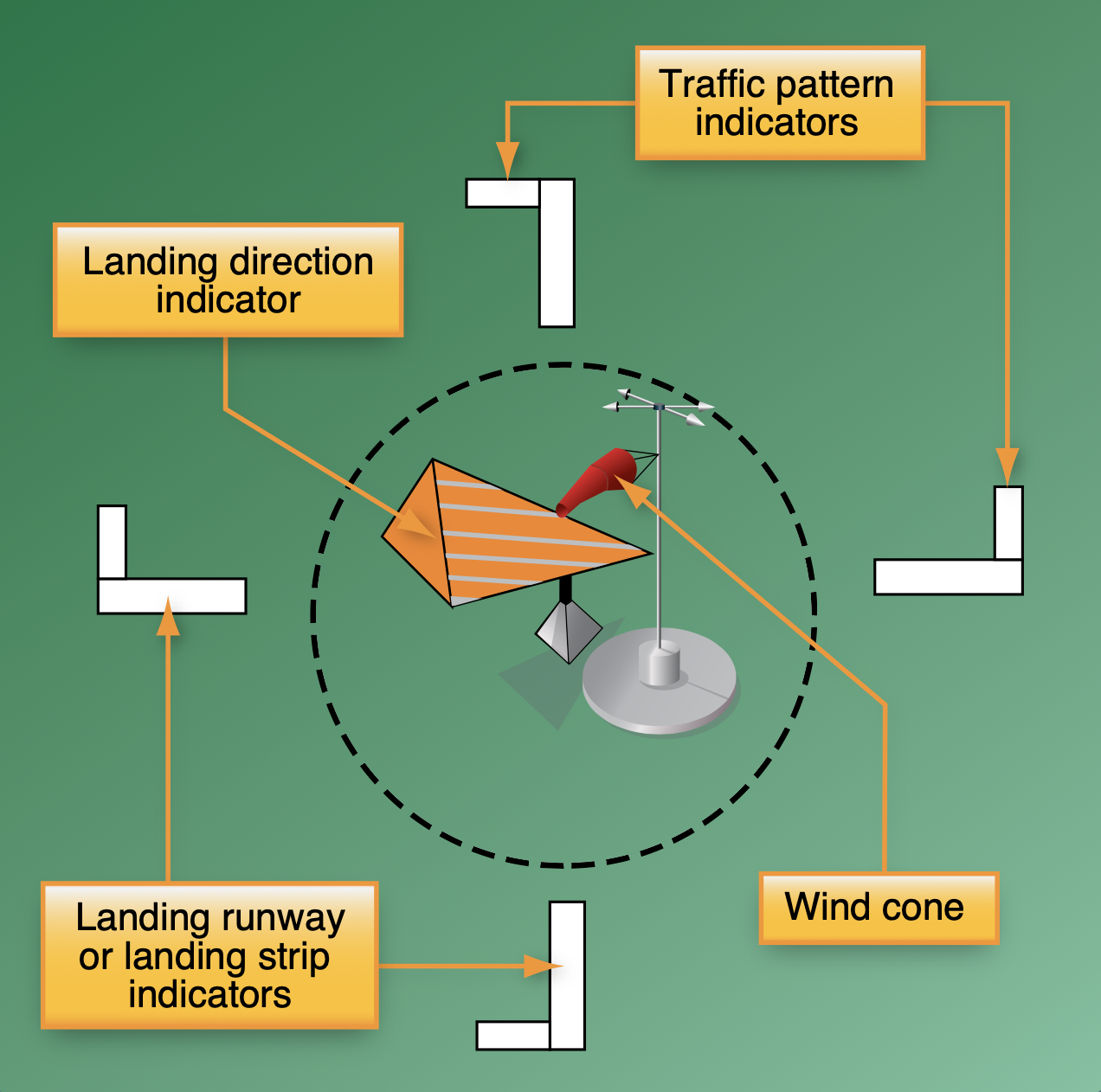
Untowered airports may install a segmented circle visual indicator system to indicate which traffic pattern to fly.

At airports without an operating control tower, a segmented circle visual indicator system, if installed, is designed to provide traffic pattern information. Usually located in a position affording maximum visibility to pilots in the air and on the ground and providing a centralized location for other elements of the system, the segmented circle consists of the following components: wind direction indicators such as windsocks, landing direction indicators, landing strip indicators, and traffic pattern indicators.

Landing strip indicators are installed in pairs and are used to show the alignment of landing strips. Traffic pattern indicators are arranged in pairs in conjunction with landing strip indicators and used to indicate the direction of turns when there is a variation from the normal left traffic pattern. If there is no segmented circle installed at the airport, traffic pattern indicators may be installed on or near the end of the runway.

== Helicopters ==
Helicopter pilots also prefer to land facing the wind and are often asked to fly a pattern on arrival or departure. Many airfields operate a special pattern for helicopters to take account of their low airspeed. This is usually a mirror image of the fixed-wing pattern, and often at a slightly lower standard height above surface level; as noted above this altitude is usually 500 feet above ground level. However, due to helicopters' unique maneuverability, helicopter pilots often choose not to enter the pattern, and make a direct approach to the helipad or apron they wish to land on.

== Other patterns ==
If an aircraft intending to land must be delayed, the air traffic control (ATC) may decide to place it in a holding pattern until the airport is prepared to permit the landing. Commercial aircraft on hold will generally fly slow, racetrack-shaped patterns which differ considerably from the airfield traffic pattern that will be commenced once the approval has been given to land. Although an aircraft in a holding pattern may similarly circle the airport, ATC may designate a distant location in which to circle.

== See also ==
- Holding (aeronautics)
- Teardrop turn
- Touch-and-go landing
