= Run and break =

In aviation, a run and break is a procedure used by high-performance aircraft to join an airfield traffic pattern without requiring the aircraft to spend a long time flying at low speed. As such, it is a procedure normally used by military aircraft at military airfields; however, because it is also used by ex-military types it may sometimes be performed at civilian airfields. This maneuver is also known as initial and pitch; or in the US as an overhead maneuver or overhead break.

== The run ==
The pilot circles some distance away from airfield at high speed until the air traffic controller confirms that it is safe for the procedure to begin. Once safely cleared, the pilot aligns the aircraft with the active runway and calls initial at a set time from the airfield (usually 30 seconds or one minute). The aircraft is then flown at high speed along the deadside of the runway in the landing direction at a low altitude, typically less than 1,000 feet (300 m) AGL. By contrast, approach patterns at civilian airfields in many countries are typically flown at 1,000 feet (300 m) feet AGL.

== The break ==
At some point during "the run", usually midway down the runway, the pilot will fly the aircraft up and away from the runway in a tight crosswind leg, to position downwind in the pattern to land. This maneuver is performed at high-g which causes significant induced drag; this drag causes a rapid reduction of airspeed. During this the aircraft is configured to land. The aircraft therefore arrives late downwind in the pattern at a safe low speed, configured to land, with minimum time spent at lower speeds.

The Red Arrows sometimes perform a spectacular variation on the run and break, which includes a 9-ship formation loop during the run segment with the aircraft breaking to alternate sides of the runway in a staggered fashion. All the Arrows thus end up at different positions downwind in the pattern to land and can land in sequence.
