= Final approach =

Final stage in an aircraft's approach to landing

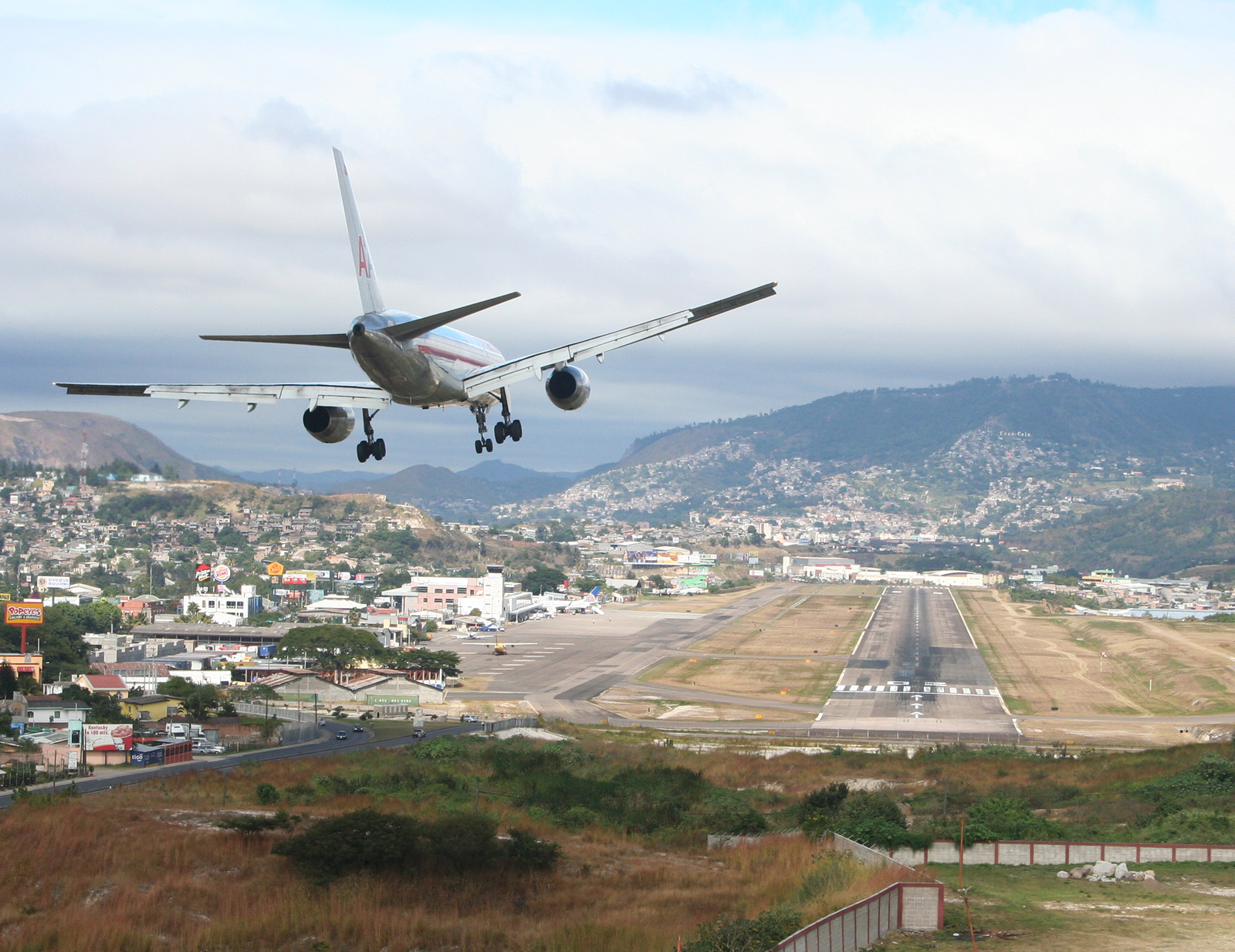
Final approach at Toncontin Airport

In aeronautics, the final approach (also called the final leg and final approach leg) is the last leg in an aircraft's approach to landing, when the aircraft is lined up with the runway and descending for landing. In aviation radio terminology, it is often shortened to "final". The last section of the final approach is sometimes referred to as short final.

In a standard airport landing pattern, which is usually used under visual meteorological conditions (VMC), aircraft turns from base leg to final within one-half to two miles of the airport. For instrument approaches, as well as approaches into a controlled airfield under visual flight rules (VFR), often a "straight-in" final approach is used, where all the other legs are dispensed within. Straight-in approaches are discouraged at non-towered airports in the United States.

== Approach slope ==
An approach slope is the path that an aircraft follows on its final approach to land on a runway. It is ideally a gentle downward slope. A commonly used approach slope is 3° from the horizontal. However, some airports have a steeper approach slope because of topography, buildings, or other considerations. London City Airport, for example, has a 5.5° approach slope; only aircraft that can maintain such an approach slope are allowed to use the airport. In the United Kingdom, any approach of 4.5° or greater is defined as steep and requires special approval. Steeper approaches require a longer landing distance, which reduces runway throughput at busy airports, and requires longer taxi distances. Airports such as Heathrow and London Luton are trialling slightly steeper approaches (3.2°) to reduce noise, by keeping the aircraft higher for longer and reducing engine power required during descent.

United States TERPS (Terminal Instrument Procedures) specifies maximum glidepath angles/vertical descent angles for each aircraft approach category.

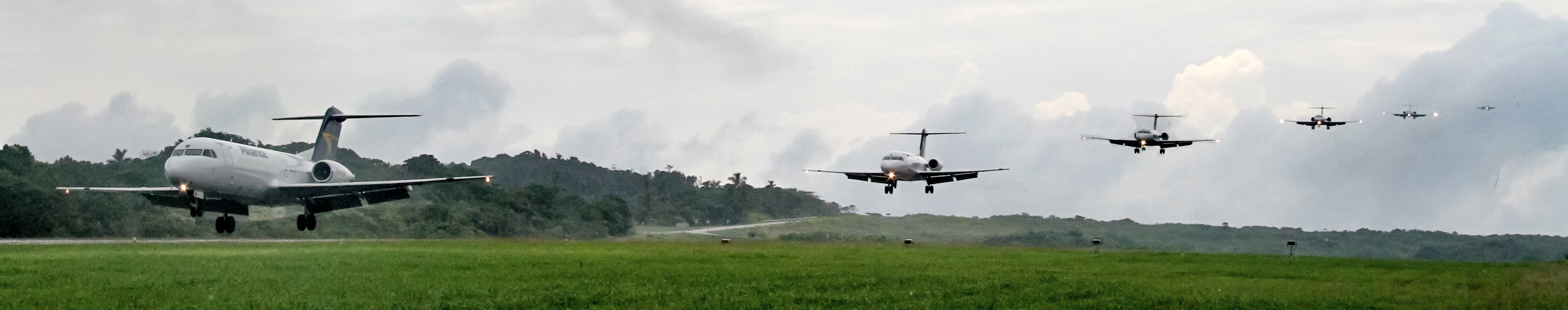
A composite image of an Alliance Airlines Fokker 70 on final approach at Christmas Island Airport, illustrating the approach slope to the runway

The term glide slope is sometimes used to mean approach slope, although in precise usage the glide slope is the vertical guidance element of the instrument landing system.

== Final approach fix (FAF) and final approach point (FAP) ==
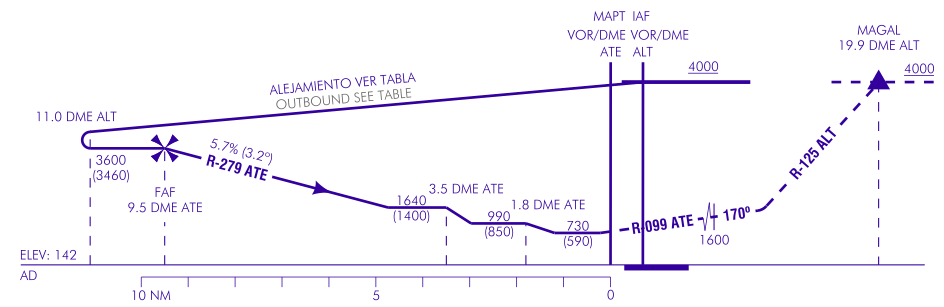
VOR Approach to Runway 10 at Alicante–Elche Miguel Hernández Airport. Showing the FAF for this non-precision approach.

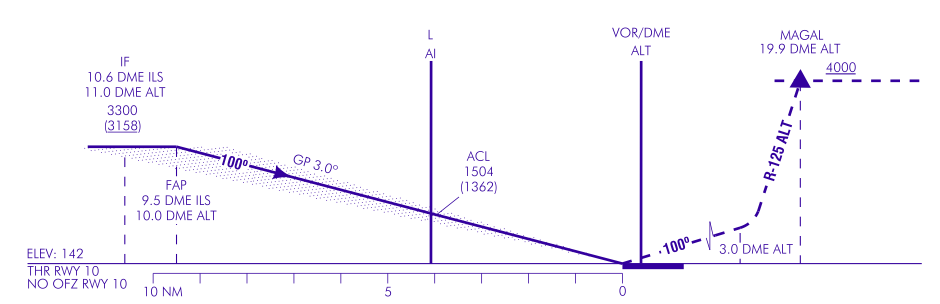
ILS Approach to Runway 10 at Alicante–Elche Miguel Hernández Airport. Showing the FAP for this precision approach.

ICAO operating procedures describe the final approach segment as being the segment beginning at the final approach fix/point (FAF/FAP) and ending at the missed approach point (MAPt). The FAF/FAP is generally either a co-located navigational aid beacon (for example a non-directional beacon) or known distance to a beacon (typically located at the aerodrome), which would identify the point for final approach to be commenced by the flying crew. The final approach point (FAP) is an equivalent point for a precision approach, where intermediate approach segment intercepts the glideslope of an instrument landing system.

Under ICAO, The FAF and FAP are two different concepts, representing potentially two different altitude-distance points from the MAPt for different approaches to the same runway. However, the FAF and FAP share the same definition as being the point at which the final approach segment is commenced. For example, the FAF for the VOR+DME approach to Runway 10 at Alicante Airport is at 3600 feet and 9.5nm from the Alicante VOR/DME ("ATE") - whereas the FAP for the ILS approach to Runway 10 at the same airport is at 3300 feet and 9.5nm from the ILS/DME.

Pragmatically, in an aviation world becoming less reliant on traditional navigational aid beacons, the FAF and FAP have come to be known as the same thing - accordingly, approach plates tend to mark the FAF/FAP with same symbol, typically with a cross symbol such as Maltese cross or cross potent.

For example, in the United States, the final approach fix is marked on a NACO IAP by a lightning bolt symbol and on a Jeppesen terminal chart by the end of the glide slope path symbol. It is the point in space where the final approach segment begins on an instrument approach. The final approach point is a point on a non-precision approach and is marked by a maltese cross symbol. In the United States, where the approach navigation aid is on the field and there is no symbol depicted, the final approach point is "where the aircraft is established inbound on the final approach course from the procedure turn and where the final approach descent may be commenced".

== See also ==
- Index of aviation articles
