= Wind direction =

Meteorological phenomenon

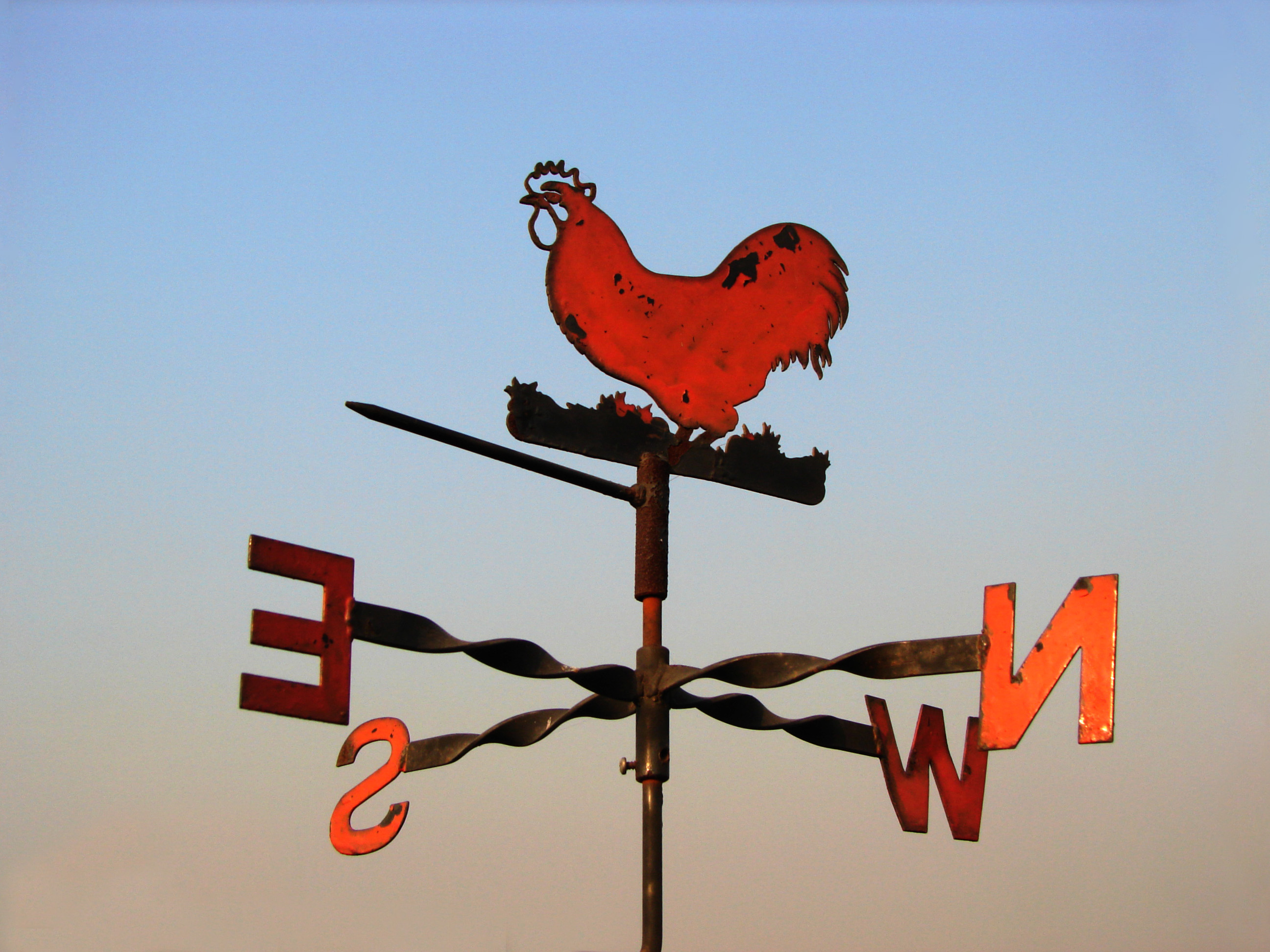
This wind vane indicates an east wind.

Wind direction is generally reported by the direction from which the wind originates. For example, a north or northerly wind blows from the north to the south; the exceptions are onshore winds (blowing onto the shore from the water) and offshore winds (blowing off the shore to the water). Wind direction is usually reported in cardinal (or compass) direction, or in degrees. Consequently, a wind blowing from the north has a wind direction referred to as 0° (360°); a wind blowing from the east has a wind direction referred to as 90°, etc.

Weather forecasts typically give the direction of the wind along with its speed, for example a "northerly wind at 15 km/h" is a wind blowing from the north at a speed of 15 km/h. If wind gusts are present, their speed may also be reported.

== Measurement techniques ==
A variety of instruments can be used to measure wind direction, such as the anemoscope, windsock, and wind vane. All these instruments work by moving to minimize air resistance. The way a weather vane is pointed by prevailing winds indicates the direction from which the wind is blowing. The larger opening of a windsock faces the direction that the wind is blowing from; its tail, with the smaller opening, points in the same direction as the wind is blowing.

Modern instruments used to measure wind speed and direction are called anemoscopes, anemometers and wind vanes. These types of instruments are used by the wind energy industry, both for wind resource assessment and turbine control. When a high measurement frequency is needed (such as in research applications), wind can be measured by the propagation speed of ultrasound signals or by the effect of ventilation on the resistance of a heated wire. Another type of anemometer uses pitot tubes that take advantage of the pressure differential between an inner tube and an outer tube that is exposed to the wind to determine the dynamic pressure, which is then used to compute the wind speed.

In situations where modern instruments are not available, an index finger can be used to test the direction of wind. This is accomplished by wetting the finger and pointing it upwards. The side of the finger that feels "cool" is (approximately) the direction from which the wind is blowing. The "cool" sensation is caused by an increased rate of evaporation of the moisture on the finger due to the air flow across the finger, and consequently the "finger technique" of measuring wind direction does not work well in either very humid or very hot conditions. The same principle is used to measure the dew point using a sling psychrometer (a more accurate instrument than the human finger).

Another primitive technique for measuring wind direction is to take a pinch of grass and drop it; the direction that the grass falls is the direction the wind is blowing. This last technique is often used by golfers because it allows them to gauge the strength of the wind.

== See also ==
- Air masses
- Apparent wind
- Beaufort scale
- Wind fetch
- Wind power
- Wind rose
- Wind transducer
- Yamartino method for calculating the standard deviation of wind direction
