= Wind gust =

Brief increase in wind speed

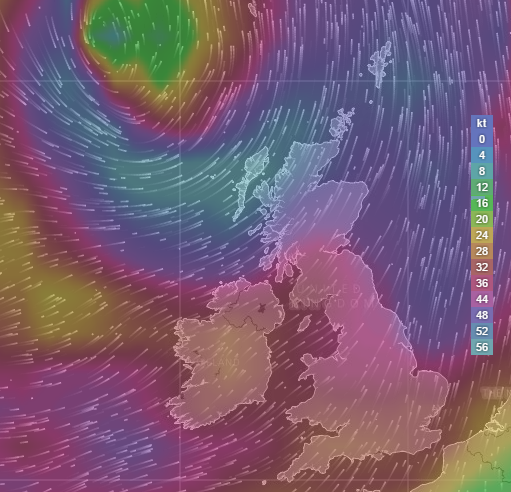
Wind gust speeds during Storm Abigail in November 2015

Sound of wind blowing in a pine forest at around 25 m/sec, with gust alterations

A wind gust or simply gust is a brief, sudden increase in the wind speed. It usually lasts for less than 20 seconds, briefer than a squall, which lasts minutes. A gust is followed by a lull (or slackening) in the wind speed. Generally, winds are least gusty over large water surfaces and most gusty over rough land and near high buildings.

== Definition ==
The wind is measured using an anemometer or estimated with a windsock. The average value of wind speed is generally measured over a period of 2 minutes before the meteorological observation according to the World Meteorological Organization. Any significant variation at this mean wind during the ten minutes preceding the observation are noted as gusts in messages such as METAR.

It is generally reported in METAR when the peak wind speed reaches at least 16 knots (30 km/h; 18 mph) and the variation in wind speed between the peaks and average wind is at least 9 to 10 knots (17 to 19 km/h; 10 to 12 mph). In marine meteorology, the top speed of a burst is expressed in meters per second (m/s) or in knots, while the Beaufort scale is used for reporting the mean speed. When the maximum speed exceeds the average speed by 10 to 15 knots (19 to 28 km/h; 12 to 17 mph), the term gusts is used while strong gusts is used for departure of 15 to 25 knots (28 to 46 km/h; 17 to 29 mph), and violent gusts when it exceeds 25 knots (46 km/h; 29 mph).
