= Wind fetch =

Length of water over which a given wind has blown

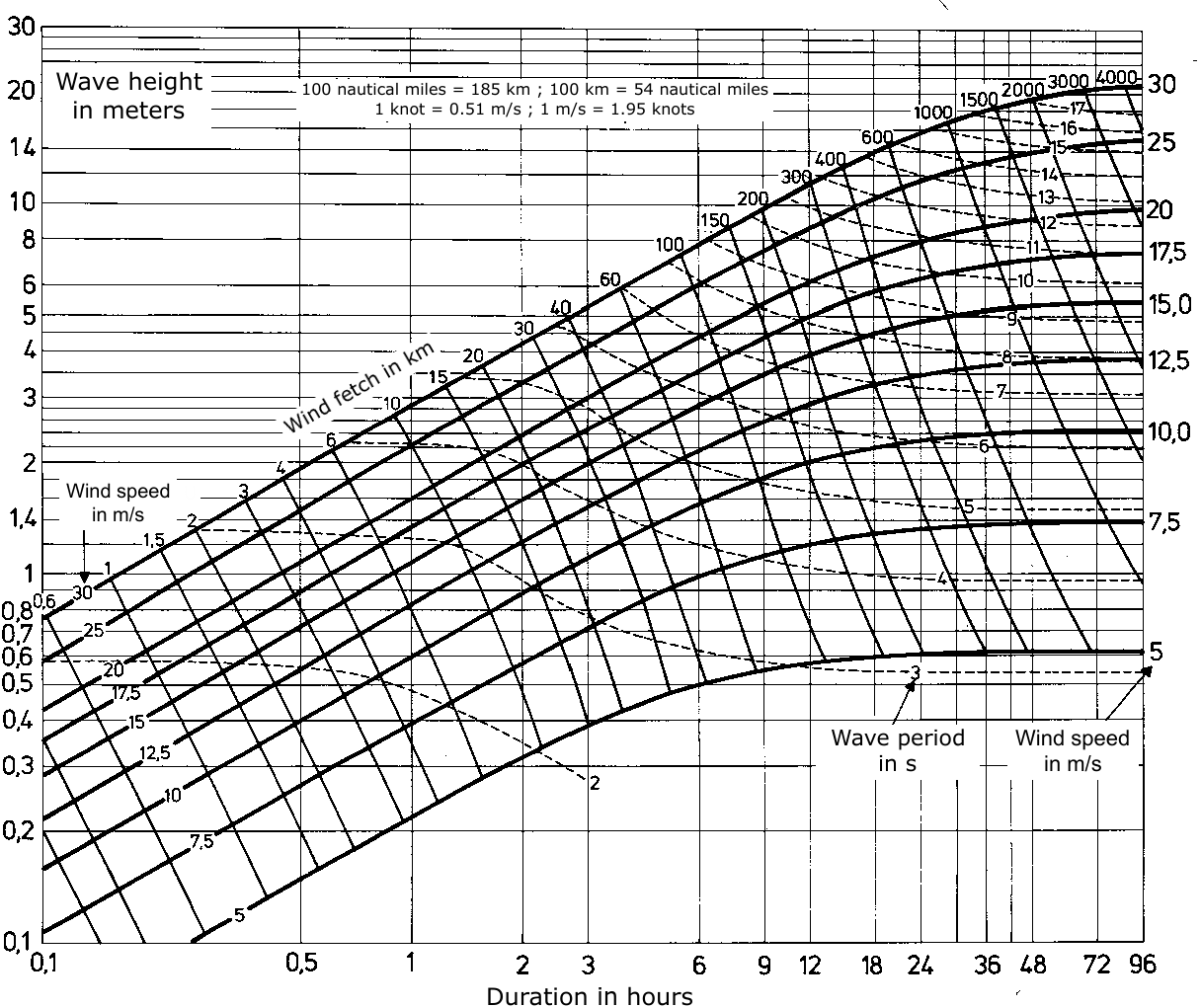
Wave growth chart based on the formulas by Groen & Dorrestein

In oceanography wind fetch, also known as fetch length or simply fetch, is the length of water over which a given wind has blown without obstruction. Fetch is used in geography and meteorology and its effects are usually associated with sea state and when it reaches shore it is the main factor that creates storm surge which leads to coastal erosion and flooding. It also plays a large part in longshore drift.

Fetch length, along with the wind speed (wind strength), and duration, determines the size (sea state) of waves produced. If the wind direction is constant, the longer the fetch and the greater the wind speed, the more wind energy is transferred to the water surface and the larger the resulting sea state will be. Sea state will increase over time until local energy dissipation balances energy transfer to the water from the wind and a fully developed sea results.

== See also ==
- Gale
- Sea state
- Ocean surface wave
- Storm surge
