= Wind run =

Weaver

Wind run is a meteorological term used to categorize or determine the total distance (or amount) of the traveled wind over a period of time. The readings are collected using an anemometer (usually part of a weather station).

Wind run can help to determine the rate of evaporation of moisture over a particular area. It may also be useful in determining the height of waves that might be encountered on large bodies of water. Longer wind runs generate higher waves on open water. It can also be used to help in the placement of wind turbines.
