= Wind transducer =

Wind measurement device

A wind transducer is a device used by sailors to receive a real-time measurement of wind speed and direction. A wind transducer is usually mounted on the masthead of a sailing boat and is occasionally used by power boats too. The wind speed and direction measurements are more critical to sailing boats than to power boats. Sailors rely on the wind speed and direction to help with navigation and pilotage. These devices can be calibrated to measure the true wind speed and the apparent wind speed (speed that a sailor would 'feel'). Sailing boats can sail at a maximum of 45 degrees close to the wind and will sail faster on a reach than when at closest to the wind.

Wind transducers are usually wired from the head to the cockpit, although 'Wireless' versions are becoming steadily more popular due to the reduced installation time required.
