= Anemoscope =

Device invented to show the direction of the wind

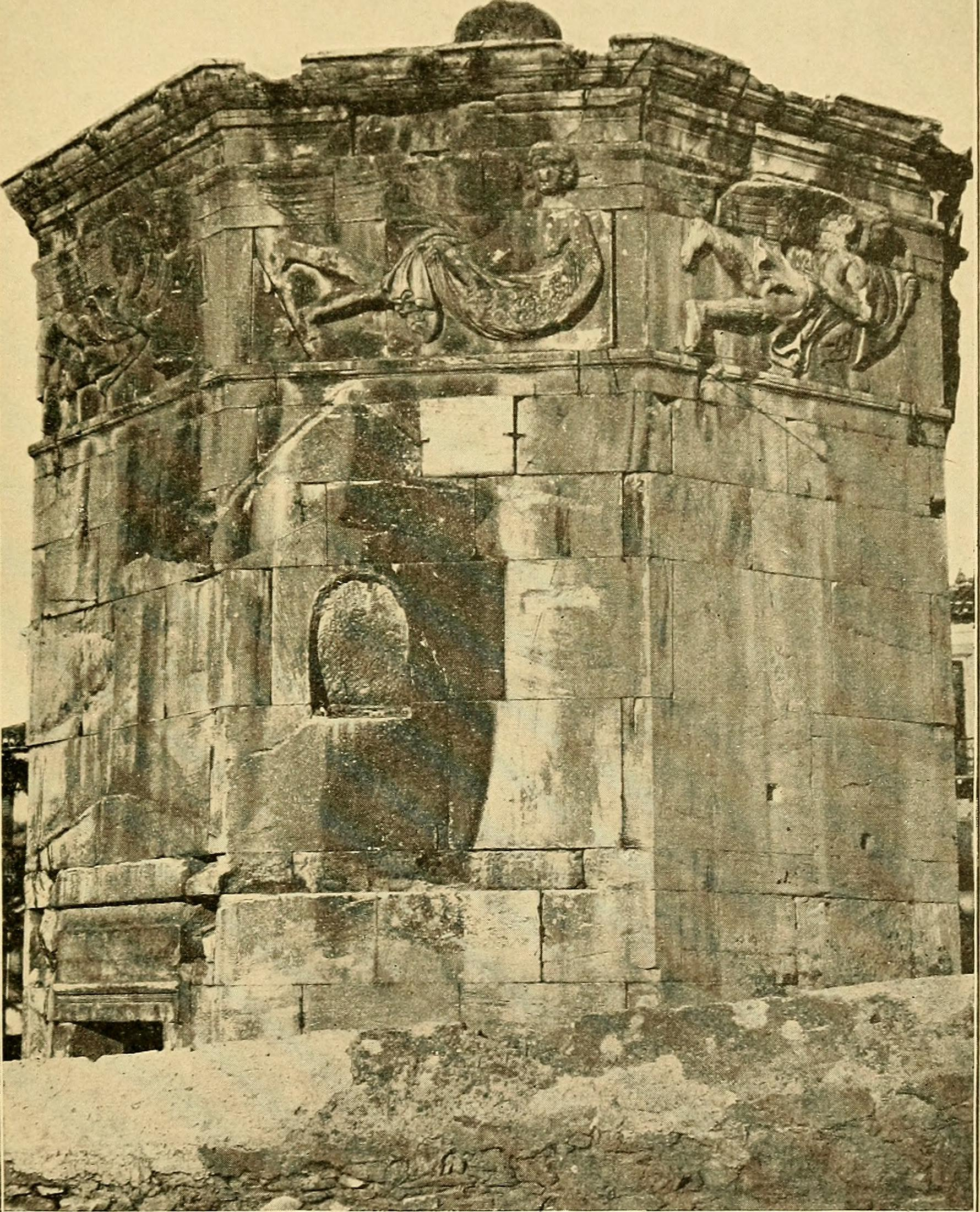
Tower of the Winds, Athens 2nd century BCE. A bronze Triton once served as a weather-vane but has vanished.

An anemoscope is a device designed to show the direction of the wind, or to indicate a change of wind direction. The name is usually applied to an apparatus consisting of a wind vane above, connecting to a building below by some kind of coupling, and with a dial or index with pointers to show the direction and changes of the wind.

Anemoscopes existed in antiquity and have evolved into modern mechanical and electronic instruments. The word is first recorded in English in the period 1700–10. It derives from the Greek word for wind + -scope.

Should not be confused with the anemometer, a device to measure the speed of the wind, alongside which it is often deployed.

== History ==
In antiquity the direction of the wind was indicated by the direction of smoke or the lifting of a flag. The anemoscope then formed a base by which the formal direction of the wind could be gauged.

The wind indicator (anemoscope) of Timosthenes (fl. 270 BCE) consisted of a disc with radius which indicated the direction of the system of twelve winds devised by him . (Aparctias, Boreas, Kaikias, Apeliotes, Euros, Euronotos, Notos, Libonotos, Lips, Zephyros, Argestes, Thrascias).

Tower of the Winds, is 2nd century BC structure in Athens. A bronze Triton once served as a weather-vane but has been lost. Eight sculptures remain around the base. These bass relief flying figures representing the winds, and under each was once a sun-dial.There was also a water-clock. As the tower was forty feet in height and twenty-seven in diameter, it still forms a striking object. This Tower of the Winds is the oldest known construction for observing the winds,

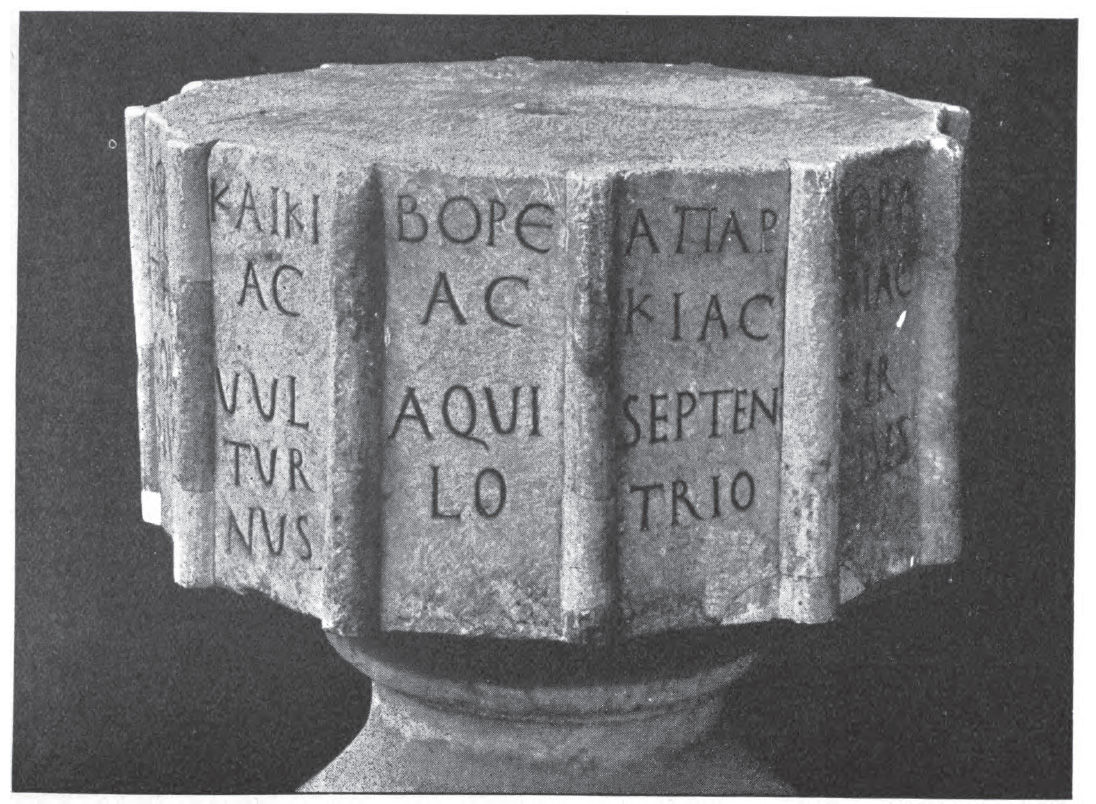
Marble Roman anemoscope (“table of the winds”), dating from 2nd or 3rd century CE, with inscriptions of the winds in both Greek and Latin. Vatican Museums, Rome.

An ancient anemoscope described by Vitruvius (1st century BCE), seems to have been intended to show which way the wind actually blew, rather than to foretell into which quarter it would change. The later anemoscope of Eftropiou is of similar design.

Hygroscopic devices, in particular those utilizing catgut, were considered as very good anemoscopes, seldom failing to foretell the shifting of the wind.

The German Otto von Guericke (1602-1686) gave the title anemoscope to a machine invented by him to foretell the change of the weather, as to fair and rain. It consisted of a small wooden man who rose and fell in a glass tube as the atmospheric pressure increased or decreased. Accordingly, M. Comiers has shown that this was simply an application of the common barometer. This form of the anemoscope was invented by Leonardo da Vinci.

In the industrial era the anemoscope became a mechanical device for transferring the point of direction of a wind vane to a display panel, or recording scroll. It achieved this through a mechanical linkage and later by an electrical signal.

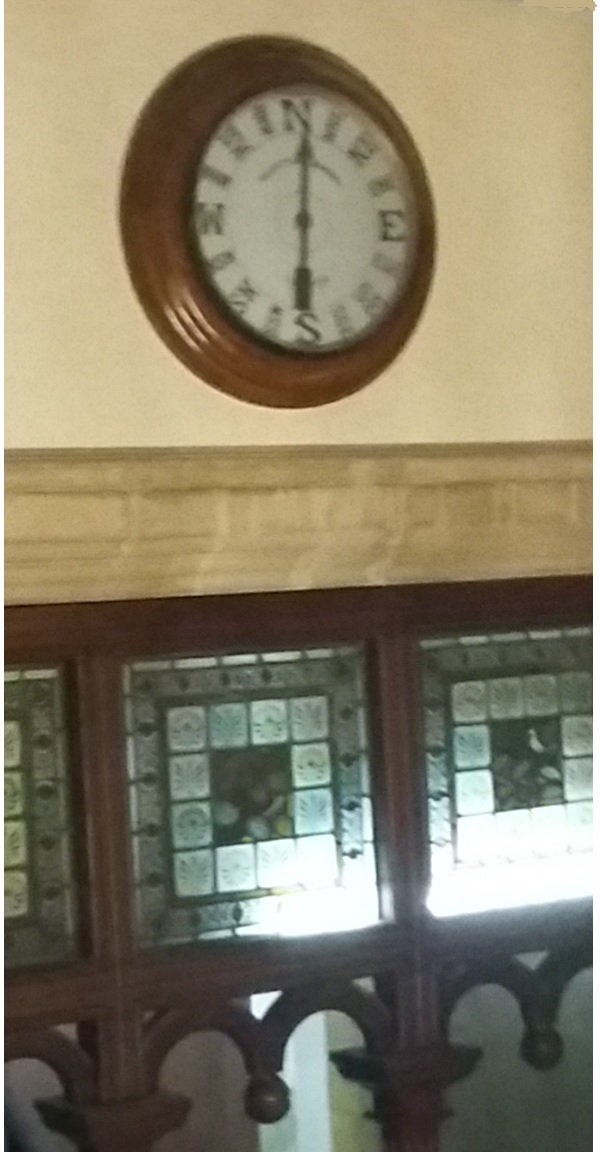
Victorian anemoscope in the stairwell of Pendley Manor Hotel, Hertfordshire, England. c1875

An example of a Victorian amenoscope (c1875) is located in the English country house, Pendley Manor in Hertfordshire. It is a large wooden dial with a pointer showing the current wind direction powered by the pressure of the wind on a vane on top of the house.

An anemoscope c1920s built by the American instrument maker Julien P. Friez & Sons is in the collection of Harvard university was designed to be used as part of an automatic wind recorder alongside a wind speed measuring anemometer.

Today anemoscopes are used in meteorological stations, and in transport especially boats. A marine anemoscope will often show the direction of the wind in relation to the directions of the boat (ie fore, aft, starboard and port) rather than the cardinal directions (north, south, east and west).

== See also ==
- Anemometer
- Weather vane
- Windsock
- Wind rose

== Sources ==
- Solari, G. (2019). The Wind and the New Science. In: Wind Science and Engineering. Springer Tracts in Civil Engineering. Springer, Cham. https://doi.org/10.1007/978-3-030-18815-3_3
