= Anemometer =

Instrument for measuring wind speed

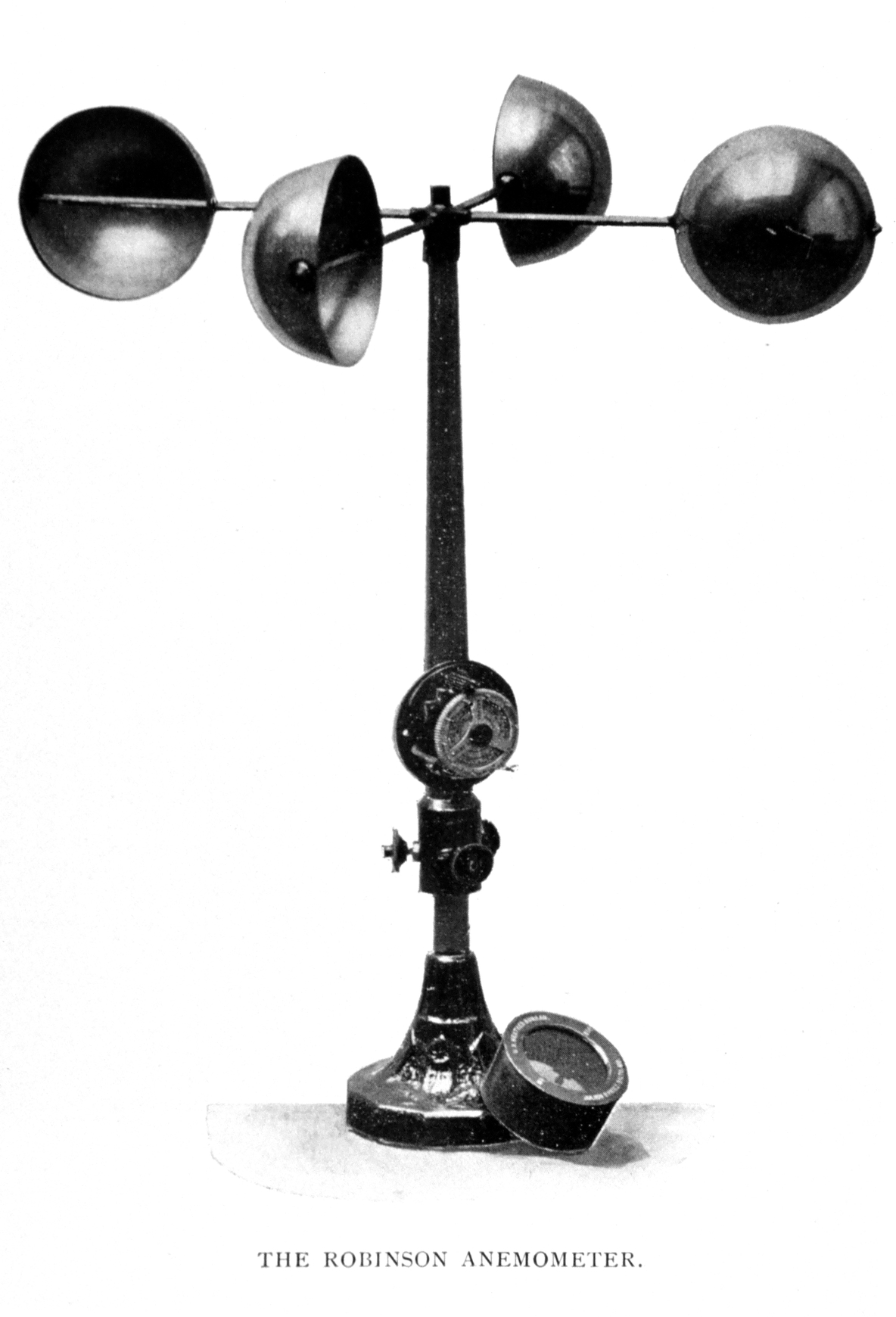
A hemispherical-cup anemometer of the type invented in 1846 by John Thomas Romney Robinson

In meteorology, an anemometer (from Ancient Greek άνεμος (ánemos) 'wind' and μέτρον (métron) 'measure') is a device that measures wind speed and direction. It is a common instrument used in weather stations. The earliest known description of an anemometer was by Italian architect and author Leon Battista Alberti (1404–1472) in 1450.

== History ==
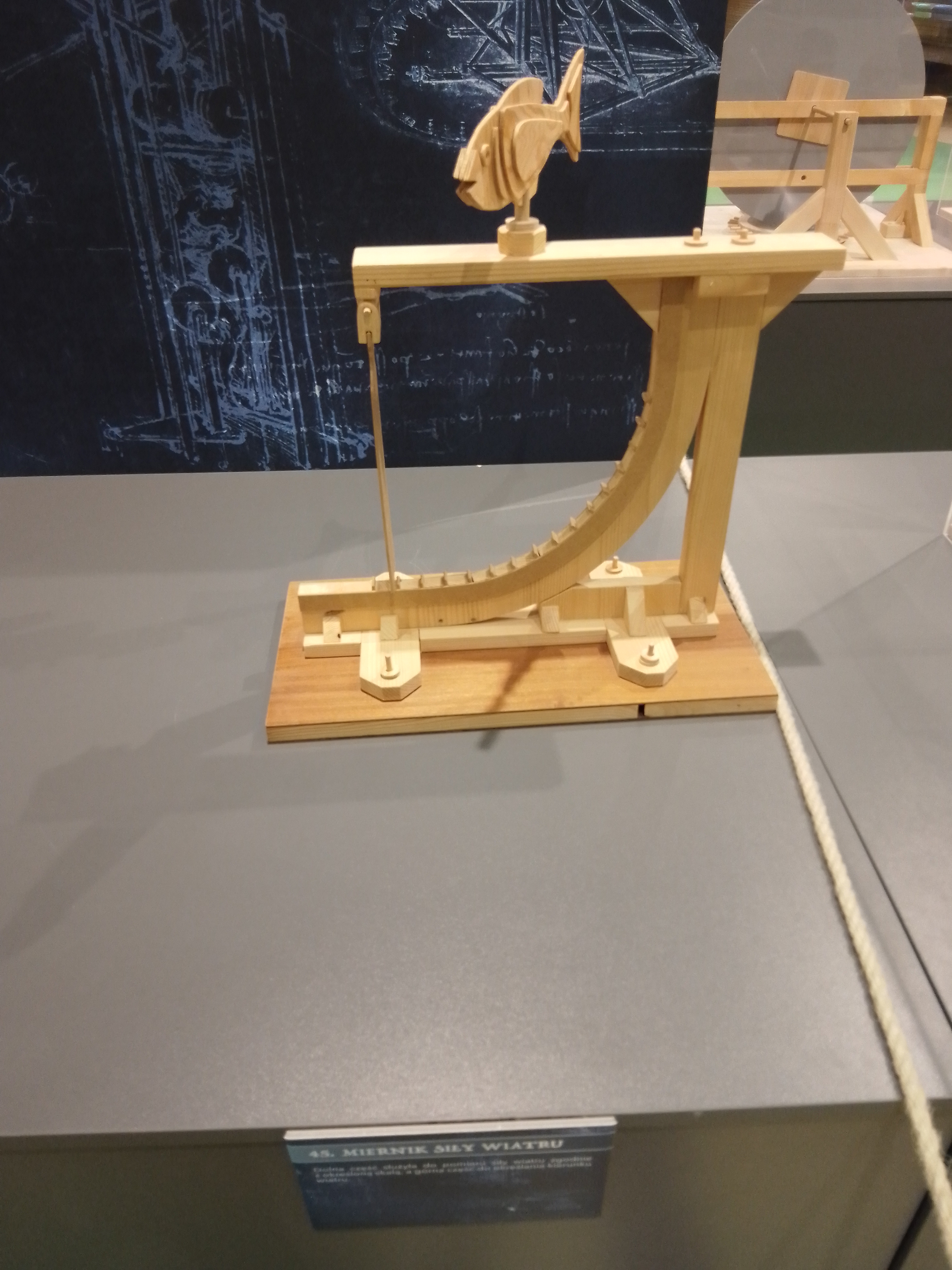
A reconstruction of an anemometer by Leonardo da Vinci

The anemometer has changed little since its development in the 15th century. Alberti is said to have invented it around 1450. In the ensuing centuries numerous emerged, including designs by Robert Hooke (1635–1703), James Lind (1736-1812), and others who independently developed their own versions, with some mistakenly credited as its original inventor. In 1846, Thomas Romney Robinson (1792–1882) improved the design by using four hemispherical cups and mechanical wheels. In 1926, Canadian meteorologist John Patterson (1872–1956) developed a three-cup anemometer, which was improved by Brevoort and Joiner in 1935. In 1991, Derek Weston added the ability to measure wind direction. In 1994, Andreas Pflitsch developed the sonic anemometer.

== Velocity anemometers ==
=== Cup anemometers ===
Cup anemometer animation

A simple type of anemometer was invented in 1845 by Rev. Dr. John Thomas Romney Robinson of Armagh Observatory. It consisted of four hemispherical cups on horizontal arms mounted on a vertical shaft. The air flow past the cups in any horizontal direction turned the shaft at a rate roughly proportional to the wind's speed. Therefore, counting the shaft's revolutions over a set time interval produced a value proportional to the average wind speed for a wide range of speeds. This type of instrument is also called a rotational anemometer.

==== Four cup ====
With a four-cup anemometer, the wind always has the hollow of one cup presented to it, and is blowing on the back of the opposing cup. Since a hollow hemisphere has a drag coefficient of .38 on the spherical side and 1.42 on the hollow side, more force is generated on the cup presenting its hollow side to the wind. Because of this asymmetrical force, torque is generated on the anemometer's axis, causing it to spin.

Theoretically, the anemometer's speed of rotation should be proportional to the wind speed because the force produced on an object is proportional to the speed of the gas or fluid flowing past it. However, in practice, other factors influence the rotational speed, including turbulence produced by the apparatus, increasing drag in opposition to the torque produced by the cups and support arms, and friction on the mount point. When Robinson first designed his anemometer, he asserted that the cups moved one-third of the speed of the wind, unaffected by cup size or arm length. This was apparently confirmed by some early independent experiments, but it was incorrect. Instead, the ratio of the speed of the wind and that of the cups, the anemometer factor, depends on the dimensions of the cups and arms, and can have a value between two and a little over three. Once the error was discovered, all previous experiments involving anemometers had to be repeated.

==== Three cup ====
The three-cup anemometer developed by Canadian John Patterson in 1926, and subsequent cup improvements by Brevoort & Joiner of the United States in 1935, led to a cupwheel design with a nearly linear response and an error of less than 3% up to 60 mph (97 km/h). Patterson found that each cup produced maximum torque when it was at 45° to the wind flow. The three-cup anemometer also had a more constant torque and responded more quickly to gusts than the four-cup anemometer.

==== Three cup wind direction ====
The three-cup anemometer was further modified by Australian Dr. Derek Weston in 1991 to also measure wind direction. He added a tag to one cup, causing the cupwheel speed to increase and decrease as the tag moved alternately with and against the wind. Wind direction is calculated from these cyclical changes in speed, while wind speed is determined from the average cupwheel speed.

Three-cup anemometers are currently the industry standard for wind resource assessment studies and practice.

=== Vane anemometers ===
One of the other forms of mechanical velocity anemometer is the vane anemometer. It may be described as a windmill or a propeller anemometer. Unlike the Robinson anemometer, whose axis of rotation is vertical, the vane anemometer must have its axis parallel to the direction of the wind and is therefore horizontal. Furthermore, since the wind varies in direction and the axis has to follow its changes, a wind vane or some other contrivance to fulfill the same purpose must be employed.

A vane anemometer thus combines a propeller and a tail on the same axis to obtain accurate and precise wind speed and direction measurements from the same instrument. The speed of the fan is measured by a revolution counter and converted to a windspeed by an electronic chip. Hence, volumetric flow rate may be calculated if the cross-sectional area is known.

In cases where the direction of the air motion is always the same, as in ventilating shafts of mines and buildings, wind vanes known as air meters are employed, and give satisfactory results.

Vane anemometers

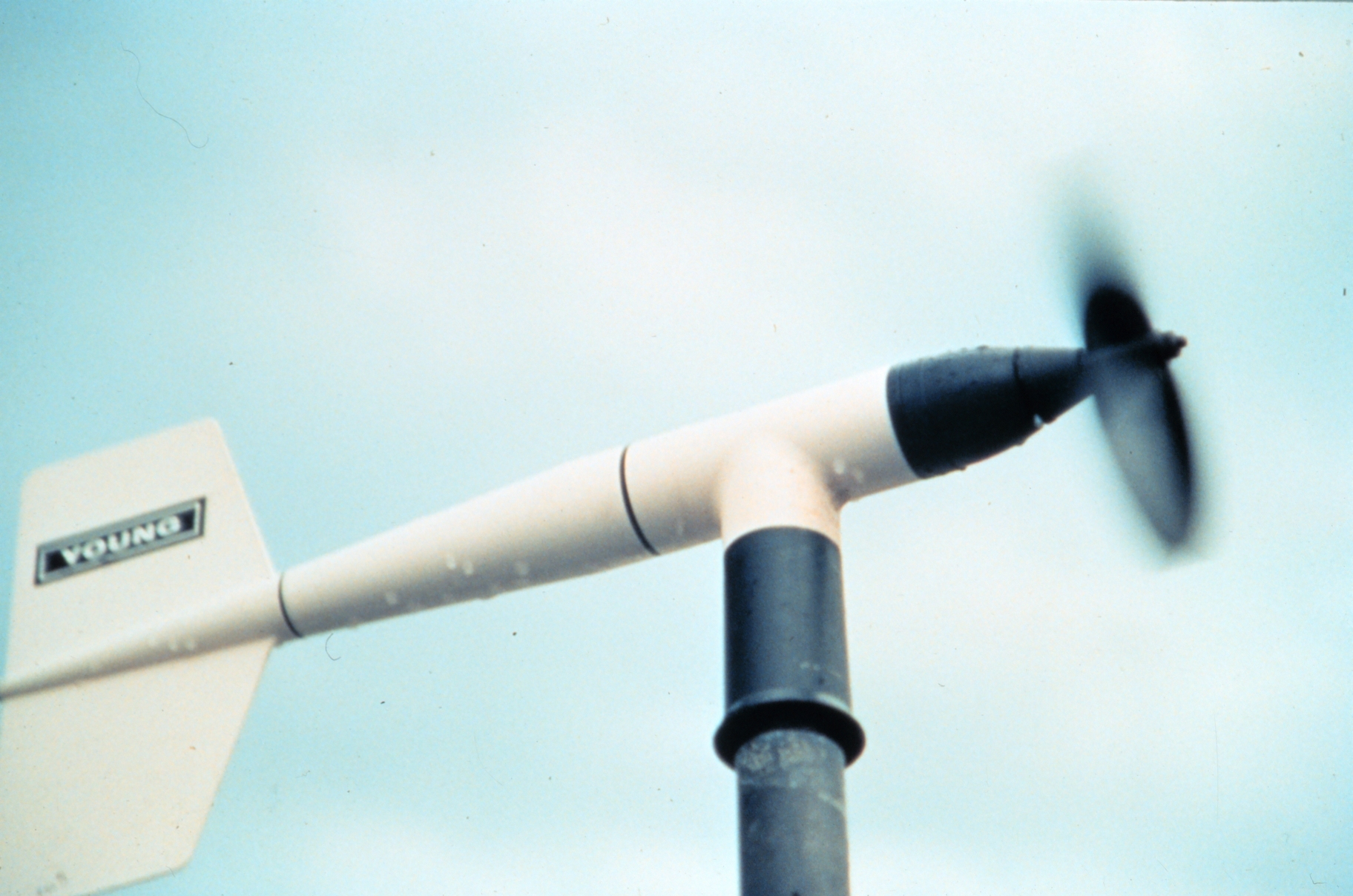
Vane style of anemometer

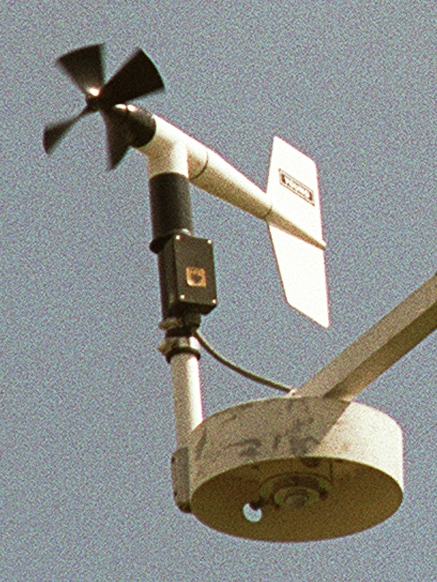
Helicoid propeller anemometer incorporating a wind vane for orientation

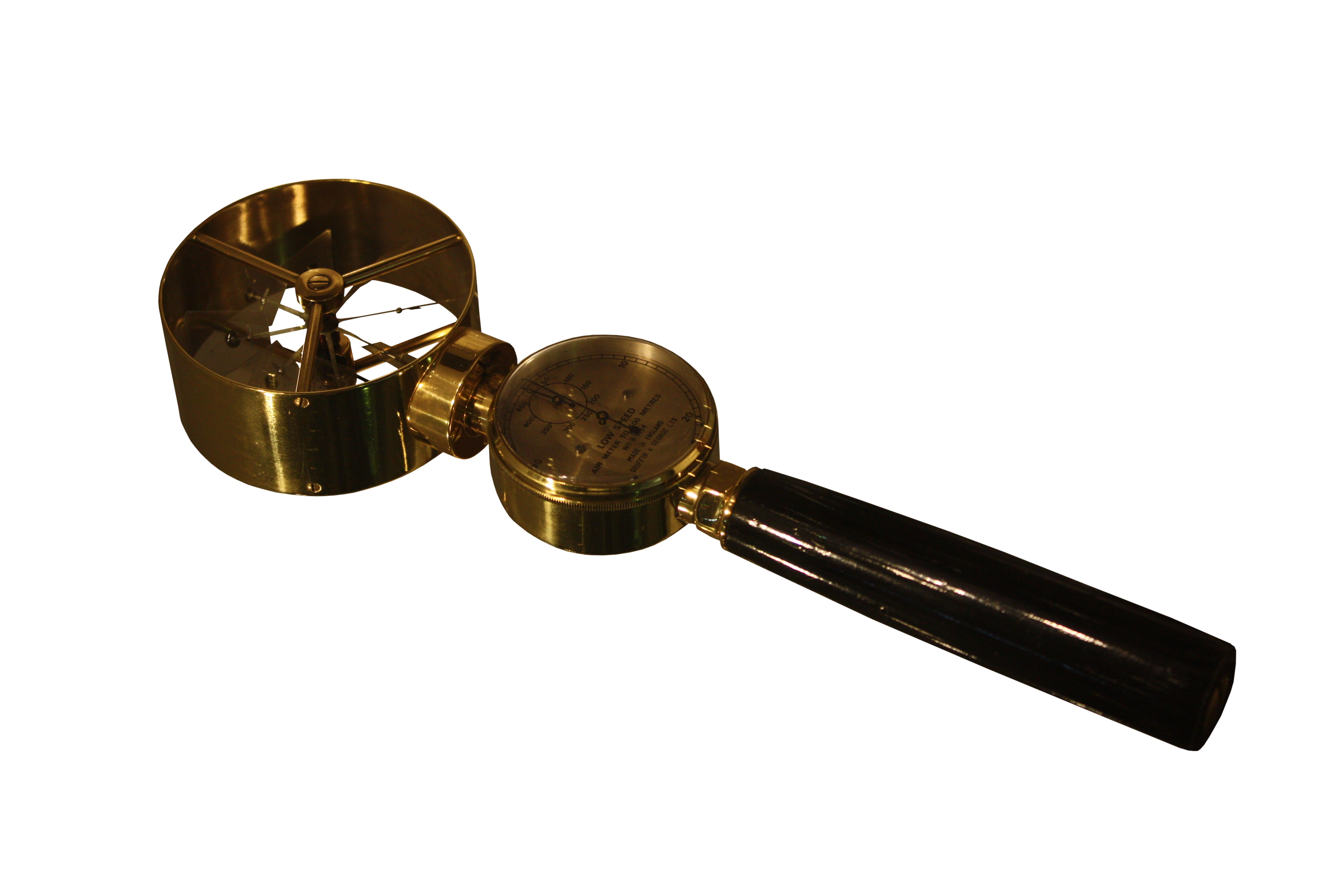
Hand-held low-speed vane anemometer

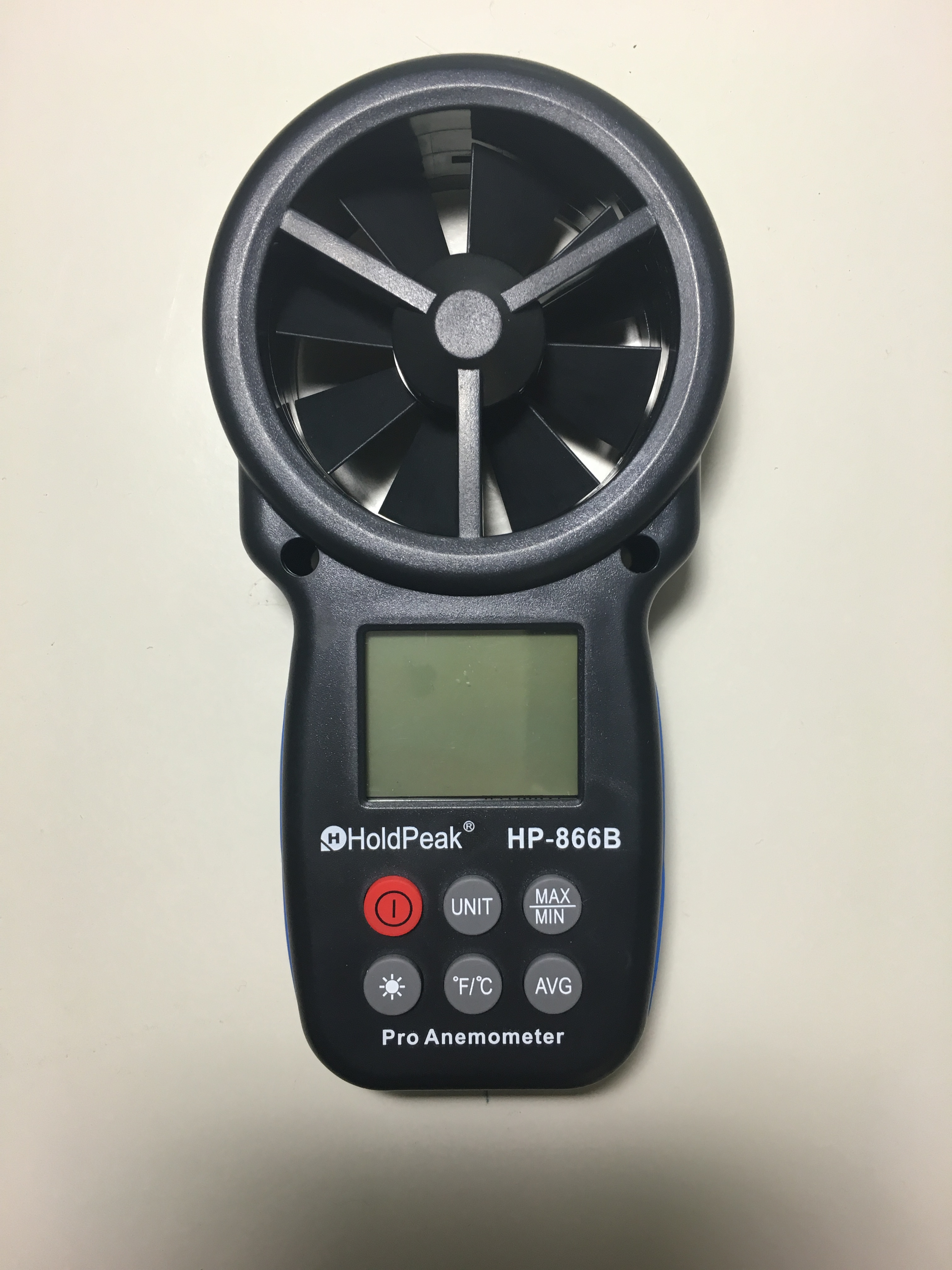
Hand-held digital anemometer or Byram anenometer

=== Hot-wire anemometers ===
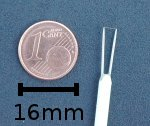
Hot-wire sensor

Hot wire anemometers use a fine wire (on the order of several micrometres) electrically heated to some temperature above the ambient. Air flowing past the wire cools the wire. As the electrical resistance of most metals is dependent upon the temperature of the metal (tungsten is a popular choice for hot-wires), a relationship can be obtained between the resistance of the wire and the speed of the air. In most cases, they cannot be used to measure the direction of the airflow, unless coupled with a wind vane.

Several ways of implementing this exist, and hot-wire devices can be further classified as CCA (constant current anemometer), CVA (constant voltage anemometer) and CTA (constant-temperature anemometer). The voltage output from these anemometers is thus the result of some sort of circuit within the device trying to maintain the specific variable (current, voltage or temperature) constant, following Ohm's law.

Additionally, PWM (pulse-width modulation) anemometers are also used, wherein the velocity is inferred by the time length of a repeating pulse of current that brings the wire up to a specified resistance and then stops until a threshold "floor" is reached, at which time the pulse is sent again.

Hot-wire anemometers, while extremely delicate, have extremely high frequency-response and fine spatial resolution compared to other measurement methods, and as such are almost universally employed for the detailed study of turbulent flows, or any flow in which rapid velocity fluctuations are of interest.

An industrial version of the fine-wire anemometer is the thermal flow meter, which follows the same concept, but uses two pins or strings to monitor the variation in temperature. The strings contain fine wires, but encasing the wires makes them much more durable and capable of accurately measuring air, gas, and emissions flow in pipes, ducts, and stacks. Industrial applications often contain dirt that will damage the classic hot-wire anemometer.

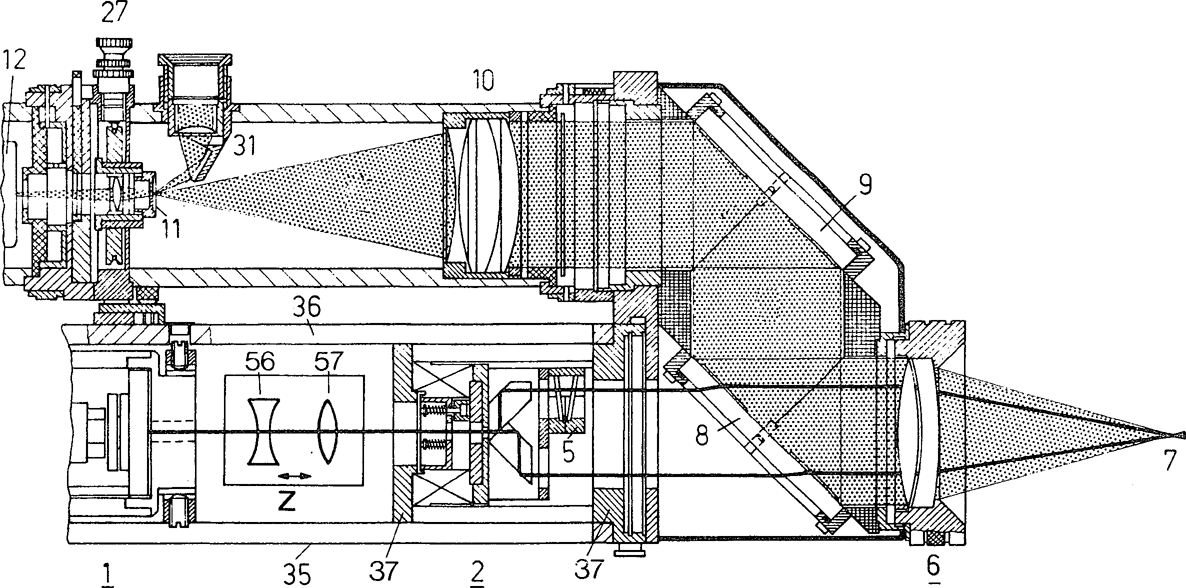
Drawing of a laser anemometer. The laser light is emitted (1) through the front lens (6) of the anemometer and is backscattered off the air molecules (7). The backscattered radiation (dots) re-enters the device and is reflected and directed into a detector (12).

=== Laser Doppler anemometers ===
In laser Doppler velocimetry, laser Doppler anemometers use a beam of light from a laser that is divided into two beams, with one propagated out of the anemometer. Particulates (or deliberately introduced seed material) flowing along with air molecules near where the beam exits reflect, or backscatter, the light back into a detector, where it is measured relative to the original laser beam. When the particles are in great motion, they produce a Doppler shift for measuring wind speed in the laser light, which is used to calculate the speed of the particles, and therefore the air around the anemometer.

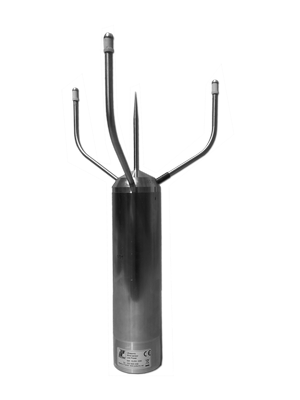
Fixed mounted 2D ultrasonic anemometer with 3 paths. Central spike keeps birds away.

=== Ultrasonic anemometers ===
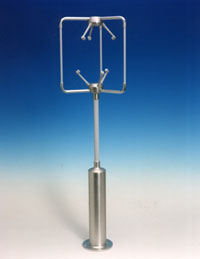
3D ultrasonic anemometer

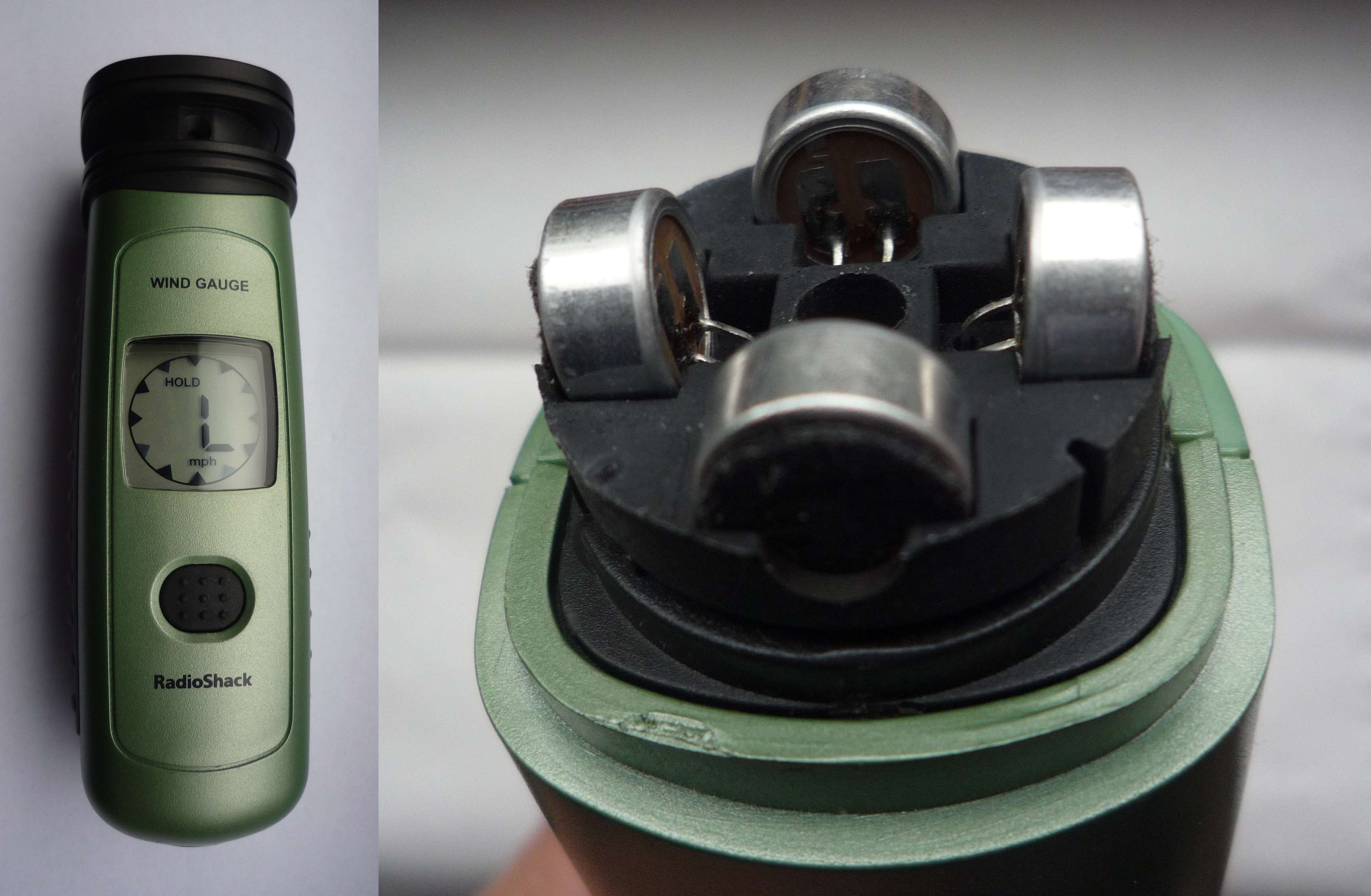
Anemometer based on sound (pressure). This one was sold by Radio Shack around 1990. Left is the device and on the right the sensor (4 microphones)..

Ultrasonic anemometers, first developed in the 1950s, use ultrasonic sound waves to measure wind velocity. They measure wind speed based on the time of flight of sonic pulses between pairs of transducers.

The time that a sonic pulse takes to travel from one transducer to its pair is inversely proportionate to the speed of sound in air plus the wind velocity in the same direction: $t=\frac{L}{(c+v)}$ where $t$ is the time of flight, $L$ is the distance between transducers, $c$ is the speed of sound in air and $v$ is the wind velocity. In other words, the faster the wind is blowing, the faster the sound pulse travels. To correct for the speed of sound in air (which varies according to temperature, pressure and humidity) sound pulses are sent in both directions and the wind velocity is calculated using the forward and reverse times of flight: $v=\frac{1}{2} L(\frac{1}{t_1}-\frac{1}{t_2})$ where $t_1$ is the forward time of flight and $t_2$ the reverse.

Because ultrasonic anenometers have no moving parts, they need little maintenance and can be used in harsh environments. They operate over a wide range of wind speeds. They can measure rapid changes in wind speed and direction, taking many measurements each second, and so are useful in measuring turbulent air flow patterns.

Their main disadvantage is the distortion of the air flow by the structure supporting the transducers, which requires a correction based upon wind tunnel measurements to minimize the effect. Rain drops or ice on the transducers can also cause inaccuracies.

Since the speed of sound varies with temperature, and is virtually stable with pressure change, ultrasonic anemometers are also used as thermometers.

Measurements from pairs of transducers can be combined to yield a measurement of velocity in 1-, 2-, or 3-dimensional flow. Two-dimensional (wind speed and wind direction) sonic anemometers are used in applications such as weather stations, ship navigation, aviation, weather buoys and wind turbines. Monitoring wind turbines usually requires a refresh rate of wind speed measurements of 3 Hz, easily achieved by sonic anemometers. Three-dimensional sonic anemometers are widely used to measure gas emissions and ecosystem fluxes using the eddy covariance method when used with fast-response infrared gas analyzers or laser-based analyzers.

==== Acoustic resonance anemometers ====
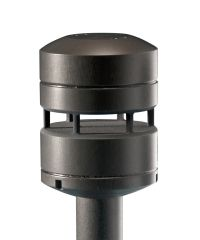
Acoustic resonance anemometer

Acoustic resonance anemometers are a more recent variant of sonic anemometer. The technology was invented by Savvas Kapartis and patented in 1999. Whereas conventional sonic anemometers rely on time of flight measurement, acoustic resonance sensors use resonating acoustic (ultrasonic) waves within a small purpose-built cavity in order to perform their measurement.

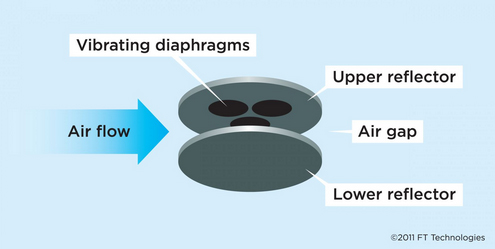
Acoustic resonance principle

Built into the cavity is an array of ultrasonic transducers, which are used to create the separate standing-wave patterns at ultrasonic frequencies. As wind passes through the cavity, a change in the wave's property occurs (phase shift). By measuring the amount of phase shift in the received signals by each transducer, and then by mathematically processing the data, the sensor is able to provide an accurate horizontal measurement of wind speed and direction.

Because acoustic resonance technology enables measurement within a small cavity, the sensors tend to be typically smaller in size than other ultrasonic sensors. The small size of acoustic resonance anemometers makes them physically strong and easy to heat, and therefore resistant to icing. This combination of features means that they achieve high levels of data availability and are well suited to wind turbine control and to other uses that require small robust sensors such as battlefield meteorology. One issue with this sensor type is measurement accuracy when compared to a calibrated mechanical sensor. For many end uses, this weakness is compensated for by the sensor's longevity and the fact that it does not require recalibration once installed.

== Pressure anemometers ==
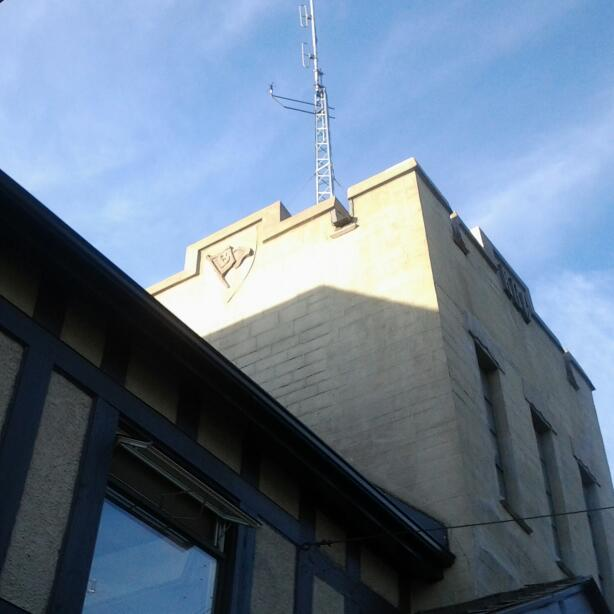
Britannia Yacht Club clubhouse tour, burgee, and wind gauge on roof

The first designs of anemometers that measure the pressure were divided into plate and tube classes.

=== Plate anemometers ===
These are the first modern anemometers. They consist of a flat plate suspended from the top so that the wind deflects the plate. In 1450, the Italian art architect Leon Battista Alberti invented the first such mechanical anemometer; in 1663 it was re-invented by Robert Hooke. Later versions of this form consisted of a flat plate, either square or circular, which is kept normal to the wind by a wind vane. The pressure of the wind on its face is balanced by a spring. The compression of the spring determines the actual force which the wind is exerting on the plate, and this is either read off on a suitable gauge, or on a recorder. Instruments of this kind do not respond to light winds, are inaccurate for high wind readings, and are slow at responding to variable winds. Plate anemometers have been used to trigger high wind alarms on bridges.

=== Tube anemometers ===
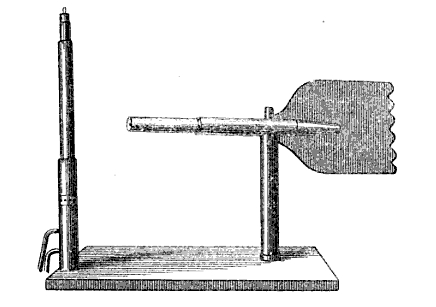
Tube anemometer invented by William Henry Dines. The movable part (right) is mounted on the fixed part (left).

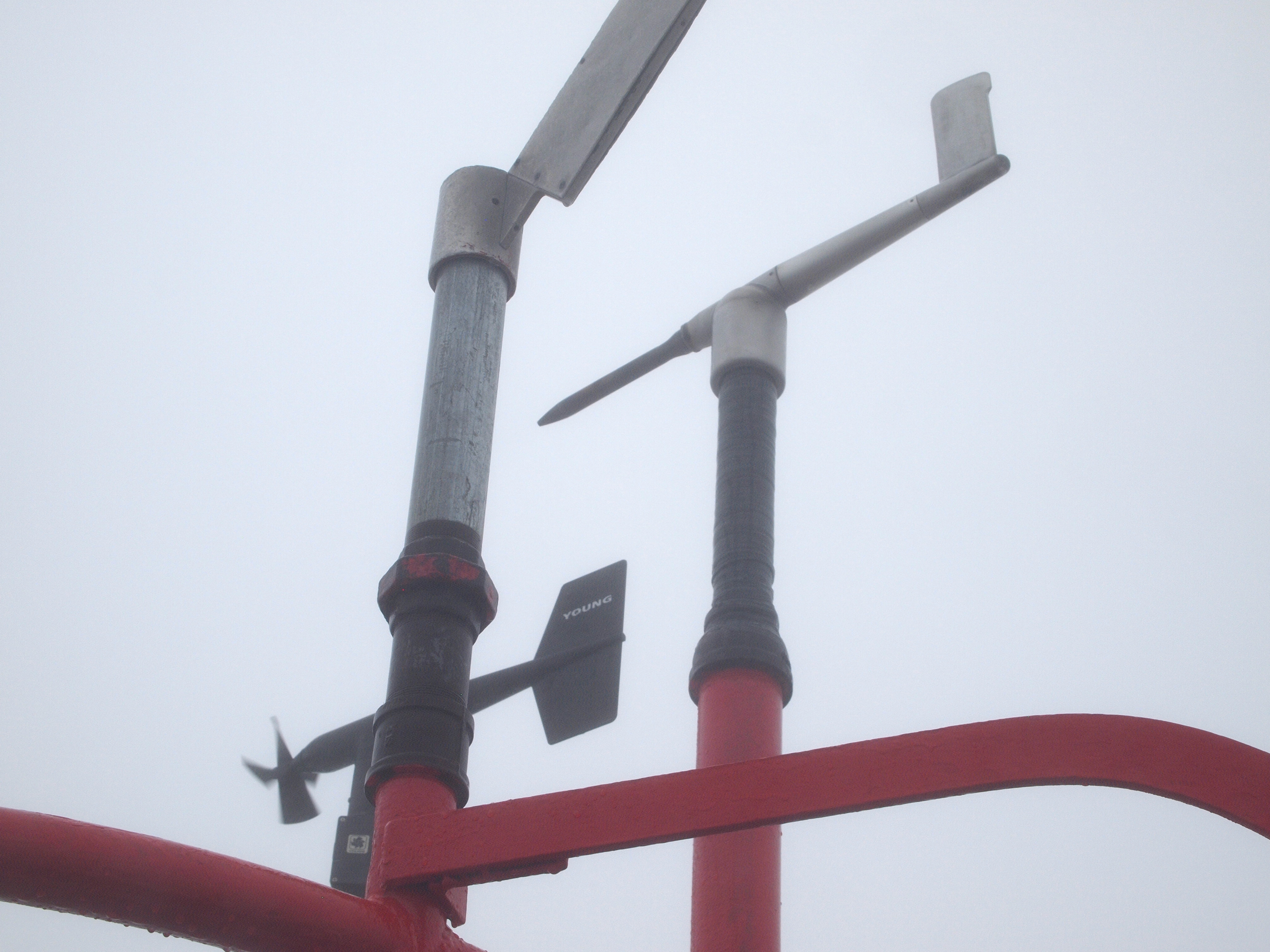
Instruments at Mount Washington Observatory. The pitot tube static anemometer is on the right.

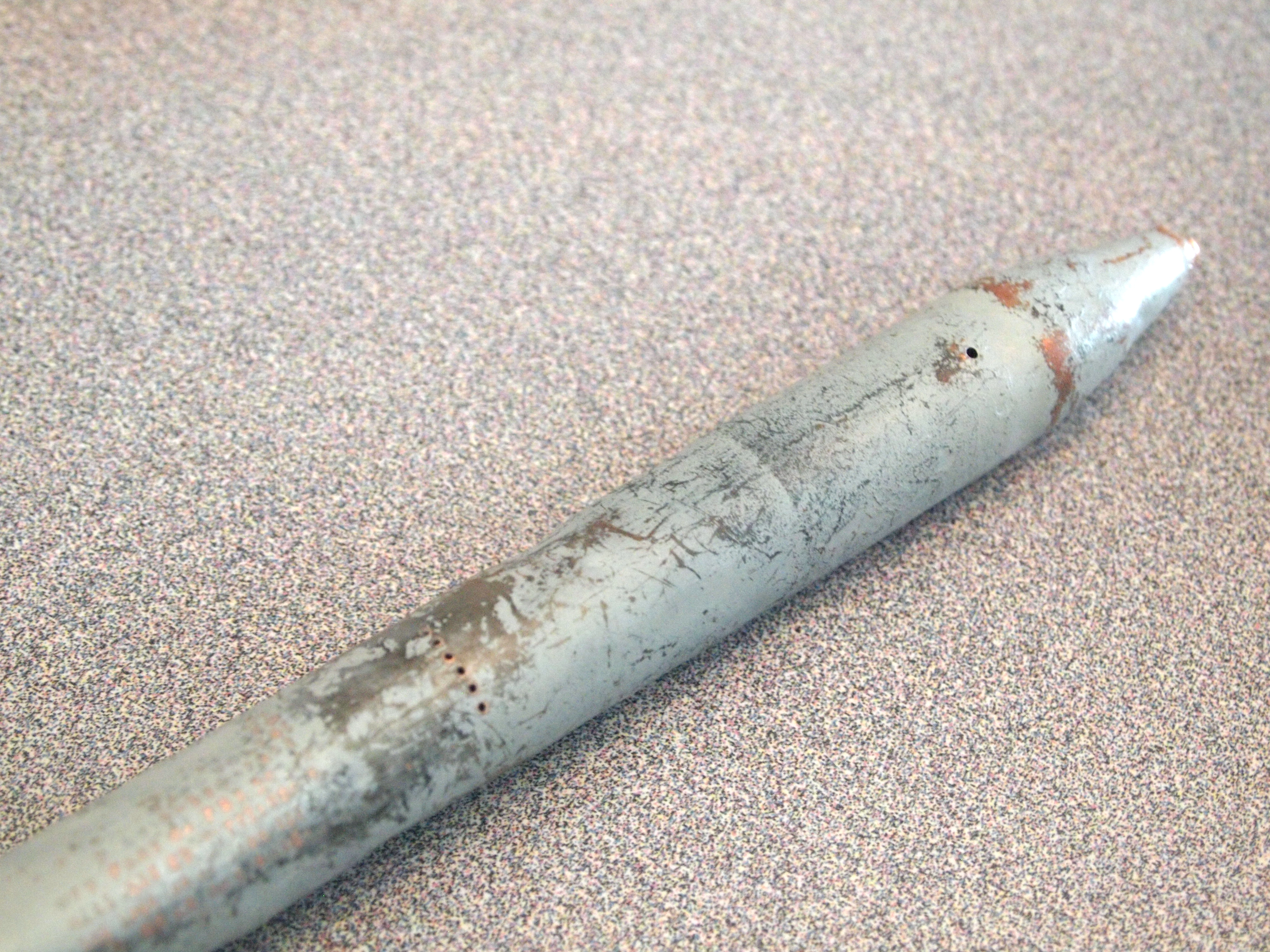
The pointed head is the pitot port. The small holes are connected to the static port.

James Lind's anemometer of 1775 consisted of a vertically mounted glass U tube containing a liquid manometer (pressure gauge), with one end bent out in a horizontal direction to face the wind flow and the other vertical end capped. Though the Lind was not the first, it was the most practical and best known anemometer of this type. If the wind blows into the mouth of a tube, it causes an increase of pressure on one side of the manometer. The wind over the open end of a vertical tube causes little change in pressure on the other side of the manometer. The resulting elevation difference in the two legs of the U tube is an indication of the wind speed. However, an accurate measurement requires that the wind speed be directly into the open end of the tube; small departures from the true direction of the wind causes large variations in the reading.

The successful metal pressure tube anemometer of William Henry Dines in 1892 utilized the same pressure difference between the open mouth of a straight tube facing the wind and a ring of small holes in a vertical tube which is closed at the upper end. Both are mounted at the same height. The pressure differences on which the action depends are very small, and special means are required to register them. The recorder consists of a float in a sealed chamber partially filled with water. The pipe from the straight tube is connected to the top of the sealed chamber and the pipe from the small tubes is directed into the bottom inside the float. Since the pressure difference determines the vertical position of the float this is a measure of the wind speed.

The great advantage of the tube anemometer lies in the fact that the exposed part can be mounted on a high pole, and requires no oiling or attention for years; and the registering part can be placed in any convenient position. Two connecting tubes are required. It might appear at first sight as though one connection would serve, but the differences in pressure on which these instruments depend are so minute, that the pressure of the air in the room where the recording part is placed has to be considered. Thus, if the instrument depends on the pressure or suction effect alone, and this pressure or suction is measured against the air pressure in an ordinary room in which the doors and windows are carefully closed and a newspaper is then burnt up the chimney, an effect may be produced equal to a wind of 10 mi/h (16 km/h); and the opening of a window in rough weather, or the opening of a door, may entirely alter the registration.

While the Dines anemometer had an error of only 1% at 10 mph (16 km/h), it did not respond very well to low winds due to the poor response of the flat plate vane required to turn the head into the wind. In 1918 an aerodynamic vane with eight times the torque of the flat plate overcame this problem.

==== Pitot tube static anemometers ====
Modern tube anemometers use the same principle as in the Dines anemometer, but using a different design. The implementation uses a pitot-static tube, which is a pitot tube with two ports, pitot and static, that is normally used in measuring the airspeed of aircraft. The pitot port measures the dynamic pressure of the open mouth of a tube with pointed head facing the wind, and the static port measures the static pressure from small holes along the side on that tube. The pitot tube is connected to a tail so that it always makes the tube's head face the wind. Additionally, the tube is heated to prevent rime ice formation on the tube. There are two lines from the tube down to the devices to measure the difference in pressure of the two lines. The measurement devices can be manometers, pressure transducers, or analog chart recorders.

=== Ping-pong ball anemometers ===
A common anemometer for basic use is constructed from a ping-pong ball attached to a string. When the wind blows horizontally, it presses on and moves the ball; because ping-pong balls are very lightweight, they move easily in light winds. Measuring the angle between the string-ball apparatus and the vertical gives an estimate of the wind speed.

This type of anemometer is mostly used for middle-school level instruction, which most students make on their own, but a similar device was also flown on the Phoenix Mars Lander.

=== Effect of density on measurements ===
In the tube anemometer the dynamic pressure is actually being measured, although the scale is usually graduated as a velocity scale. If the actual air density differs from the calibration value, due to differing temperature, elevation or barometric pressure, a correction is required to obtain the actual wind speed. Approximately 1.5% (1.6% above 6,000 feet) should be added to the velocity recorded by a tube anemometer for each 1000 ft (5% for each kilometer) above sea-level.

== Effect of icing ==
At airports, it is essential to have accurate wind data under all conditions, including freezing precipitation. Anemometry is also required in monitoring and controlling the operation of wind turbines, which in cold environments are prone to in-cloud icing. Icing alters the aerodynamics of an anemometer and may entirely block it from operating. Therefore, anemometers used in these applications must be internally heated. Both cup anemometers and sonic anemometers are presently available with heated versions.

== Instrument location ==
In order for wind speeds to be comparable from location to location, the effect of the terrain needs to be considered, especially in regard to height. Other considerations are the presence of trees, and both natural canyons and artificial canyons (urban buildings). The standard anemometer height in open rural terrain is 10 meters.

== See also ==
- Air flow meter
- Anemoi, for the ancient origin of the name of this technology
- Anemoscope, ancient device for measuring or predicting wind direction or weather
- Automated airport weather station
- Night of the Big Wind
- Particle image velocimetry
- Savonius wind turbine
- Wind power forecasting
- Wind run
- Windsock, a simple high-visibility indicator of approximate wind speed and direction
