= Wind speed =

Rate at which air moves from high- to low-pressure areas

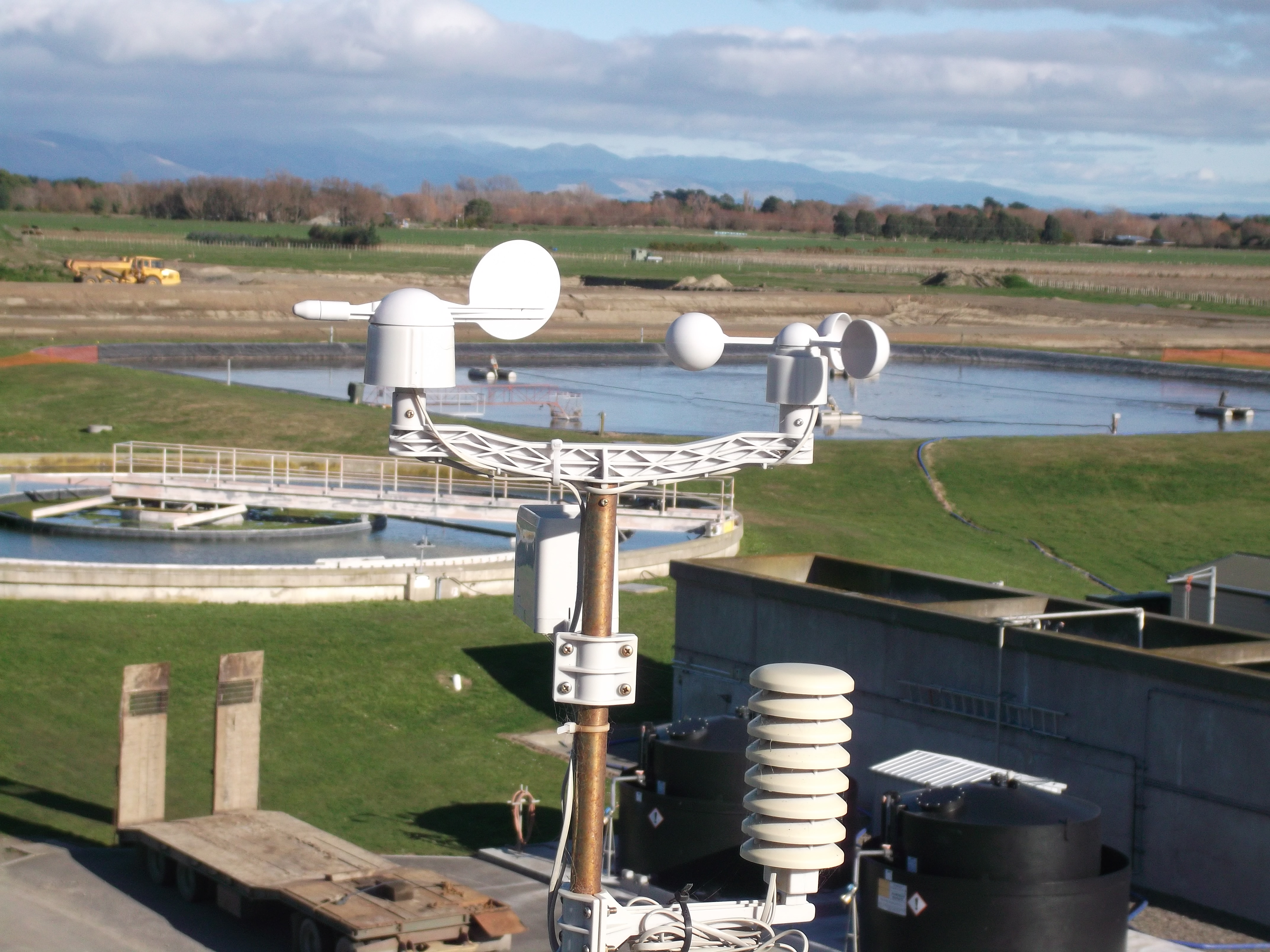
An anemometer is commonly used to measure wind speed.

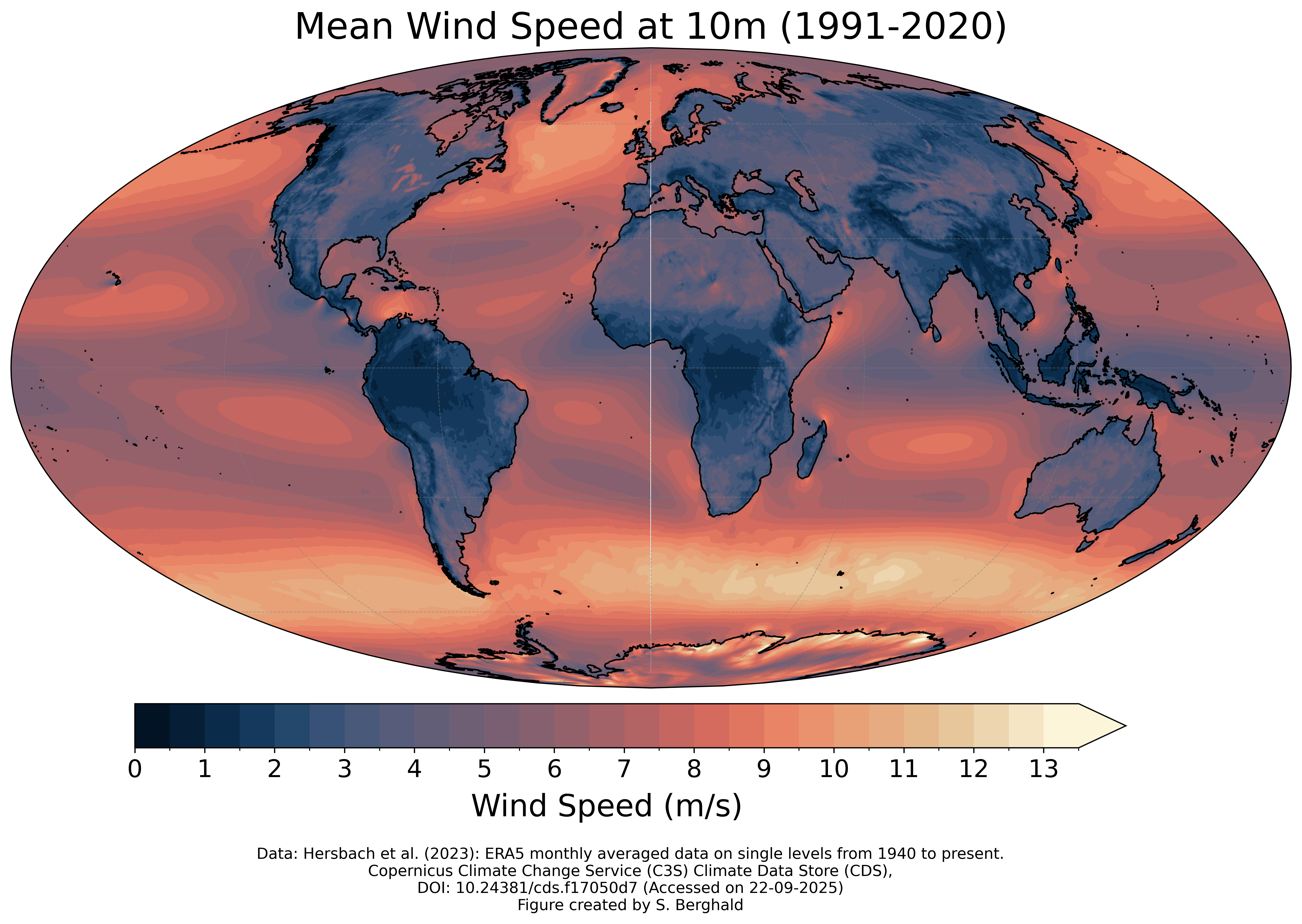
Global distribution of wind speed at 10m above ground averaged over the years 1991–2020 from the ERA5 dataset.

In meteorology, wind speed, or wind flow speed, is a fundamental atmospheric quantity caused by air moving from high to low pressure, usually due to changes in temperature. Wind speed is now commonly measured with an anemometer.

Wind speed affects weather forecasting, aviation and maritime operations, construction projects, growth and metabolism rates of many plant species, and has countless other implications. Wind direction is usually almost parallel to isobars (and not perpendicular, as one might expect), due to Earth's rotation.

== Units ==
The meter per second (m/s) is the SI unit for velocity and the unit recommended by the World Meteorological Organization for reporting wind speeds, and used amongst others in weather forecasts in the Nordic countries. Since 2010 the International Civil Aviation Organization (ICAO) also recommends meters per second for reporting wind speed when approaching runways, replacing their former recommendation of using kilometers per hour (km/h).

For historical reasons, other units such as miles per hour (mph), knots (kn), and feet per second (ft/s) are also sometimes used to measure wind speeds. Historically, wind speeds have also been classified using the Beaufort scale, which is based on visual observations of specifically defined wind effects at sea or on land.

== Factors affecting wind speed ==
Wind speed is affected by a number of factors and situations, operating on varying scales (from micro to macro scales). These include the pressure gradient, Rossby waves, jet streams, and local weather conditions. There are also links to be found between wind speed and wind direction, notably with the pressure gradient and terrain conditions.

The Pressure gradient describes the difference in air pressure between two points in the atmosphere or on the surface of the Earth. It is vital to wind speed, because the greater the difference in pressure, the faster the wind flows (from high to low pressure) to balance out the variation. The pressure gradient, when combined with the Coriolis effect and friction, also influences wind direction.

Rossby waves are strong winds in the upper troposphere. These operate on a global scale and move from west to east (hence being known as westerlies). The Rossby waves are themselves a different wind speed from that experienced in the lower troposphere.

Local weather conditions play a key role in influencing wind speed, as the formation of hurricanes, monsoons, and cyclones as freak weather conditions can drastically affect the flow velocity of the wind.

== Highest speed ==
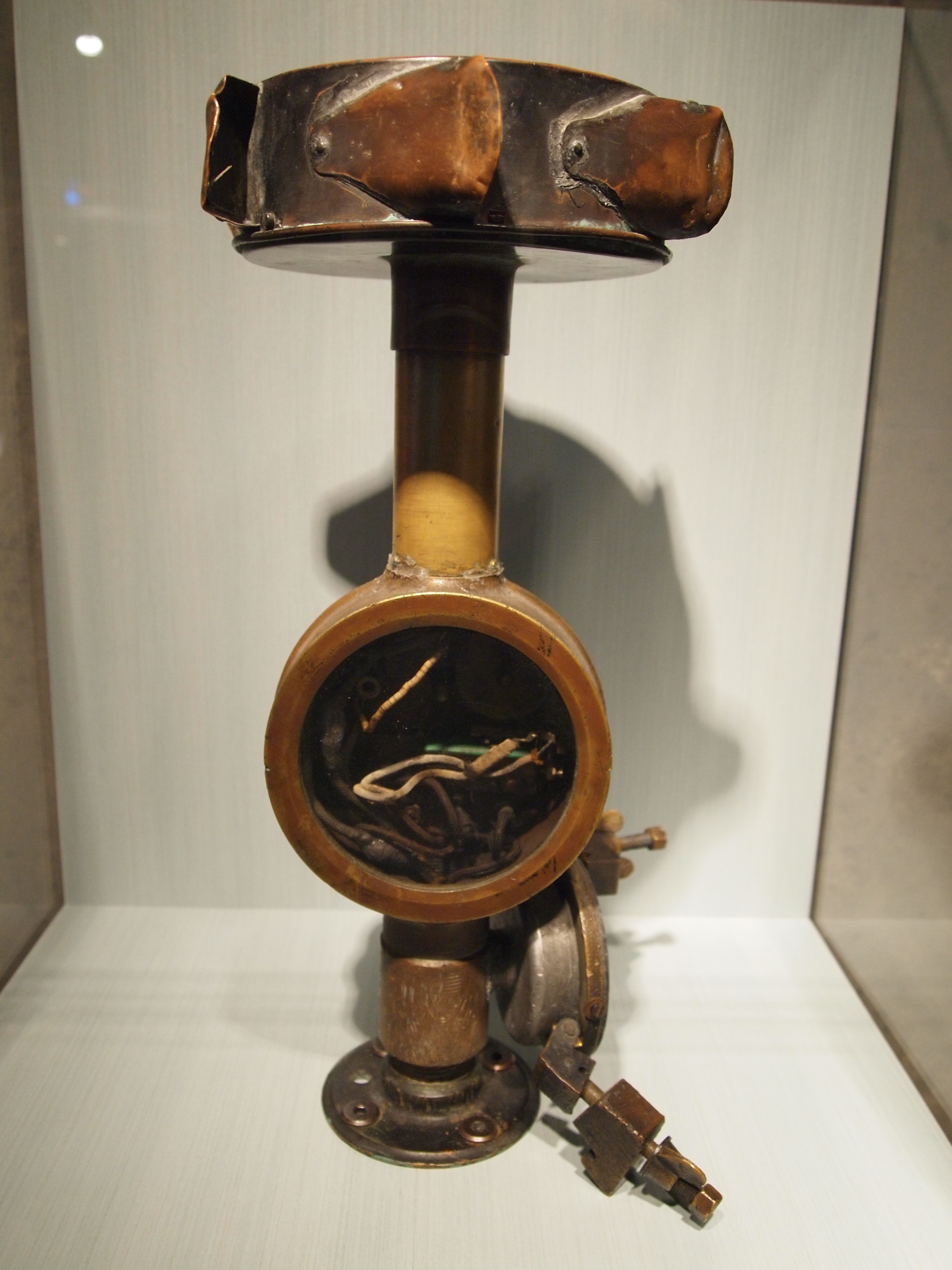
The original anemometer that measured The Big Wind in 1934 at Mount Washington Observatory

=== Non-tornadic ===
The fastest wind speed not related to tornadoes ever recorded was during the passage of Tropical Cyclone Olivia on 10 April 1996: an automatic weather station on Barrow Island, Australia, registered a maximum wind gust of 113.3 m/s (408 km/h; 253 mph; 220.2 kn; 372 ft/s) The wind gust was evaluated by the WMO Evaluation Panel, who found that the anemometer was mechanically sound and that the gust was within statistical probability and ratified the measurement in 2010. The anemometer was mounted 10 m above ground level (and thus 64 m above sea level). During the cyclone, several extreme gusts of greater than 83 m/s (300 km/h; 190 mph; 161 kn; 270 ft/s) were recorded, with a maximum 5-minute mean speed of 49 m/s (180 km/h; 110 mph; 95 kn; 160 ft/s); the extreme gust factor was on the order of 2.27–2.75 times the mean wind speed. The pattern and scales of the gusts suggest that a mesovortex was embedded in the already-strong eyewall of the cyclone.

The second and third-highest non-tornadic wind gusts measured regardless of height off the surface of the Earth were from Hurricane Melissa in 2025 and Typhoon Megi in 2010, having maximum measured wind gust speeds of 252 miles per hour (406 km/h) and 248 miles per hour (399 km/h), respectively.

Currently, the second-highest surface wind speed ever officially recorded is 103.266 m/s (371.76 km/h; 231.00 mph; 200.733 kn; 338.80 ft/s) at the Mount Washington (New Hampshire) Observatory 1,917 m (6,288 ft) above sea level in the US on 12 April 1934, using a hot-wire anemometer. The anemometer, specifically designed for use on Mount Washington, was later tested by the US National Weather Bureau and confirmed to be accurate.

=== Tornadic ===
Wind speeds within certain atmospheric phenomena (such as tornadoes) may greatly exceed these values but have never been accurately measured. Directly measuring these tornadic winds is rarely done, as the violent wind would destroy the instruments. A method of estimating speed is to use Doppler on Wheels or mobile Doppler weather radars to measure the wind speeds remotely. Using this method, a mobile radar (RaXPol) owned and operated by the University of Oklahoma recorded winds up to 150 metres per second (340 mph; 540 km/h) inside the 2013 El Reno tornado, marking the fastest winds ever observed by radar in history. In 1999, a mobile radar measured winds up to 135 m/s (490 km/h; 300 mph; 262 kn; 440 ft/s) during the 1999 Bridge Creek–Moore tornado in Oklahoma on 3 May, although another figure of 142 m/s (510 km/h; 320 mph; 276 kn; 470 ft/s) has also been quoted for the same tornado. Yet another number used by the Center for Severe Weather Research for that measurement is 135 ± 9 m/s (486 ± 32 km/h; 302 ± 20 mph; 262 ± 17 kn; 443 ± 30 ft/s). However, speeds measured by Doppler weather radar are not considered official records.

=== On other planets ===
Wind speeds can be much higher on exoplanets. Scientists at the University of Warwick in 2015 determined that HD 189733b has winds of 2,400 m/s (8,600 km/h; 4,700 kn; 7,900 ft/s; 5,400 mph). In a press release, the University announced that the methods used from measuring HD 189733b's wind speeds could be used to measure wind speeds on Earth-like exoplanets.

== Measurement ==
Modern day anemometer used to capture wind speed

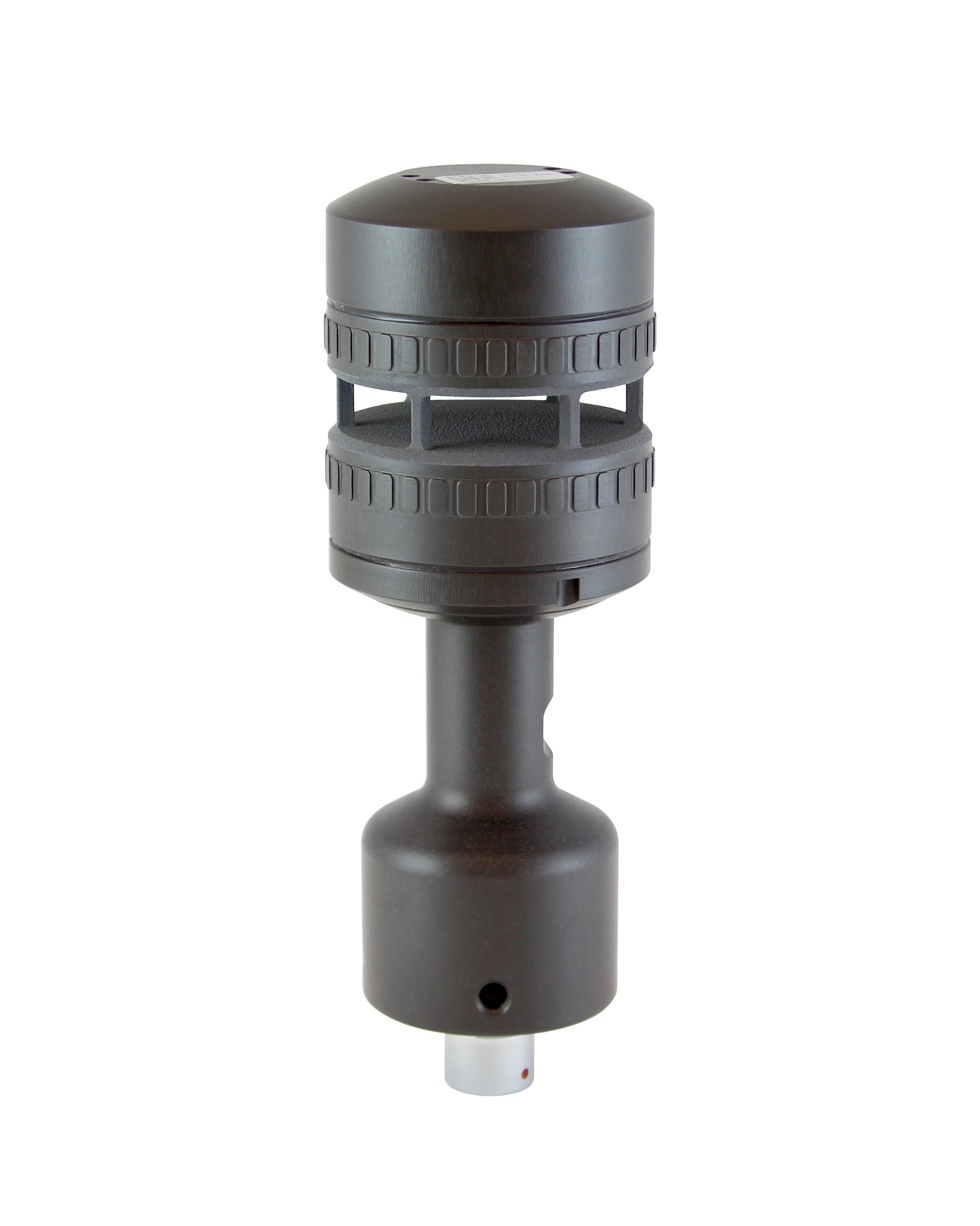
FT742-DM acoustic resonance wind sensor, one of the instruments now used to measure wind speed at Mount Washington Observatory

An anemometer is one of the tools used to measure wind speed. A device consisting of a vertical pillar and three or four concave cups, the anemometer captures the horizontal movement of air particles (wind speed).

Unlike traditional cup-and-vane anemometers, ultrasonic wind sensors have no moving parts and are therefore used to measure wind speed in applications that require maintenance-free performance, such as atop wind turbines. As the name suggests, ultrasonic wind sensors measure the wind speed using high-frequency sound. An ultrasonic anemometer has two or three pairs of sound transmitters and receivers. Each transmitter constantly beams high-frequency sound to its receiver. Electronic circuits inside measure the time it takes for the sound to make its journey from each transmitter to the corresponding receiver. Depending on how the wind blows, some of the sound beams will be affected more than the others, slowing it down or speeding it up very slightly. The circuits measure the difference in speeds of the beams and use that to calculate how fast the wind is blowing.

Acoustic resonance wind sensors are a variant of the ultrasonic sensor. Instead of using time of flight measurement, acoustic resonance sensors use resonating acoustic waves within a small purpose-built cavity. Built into the cavity is an array of ultrasonic transducers, which are used to create the separate standing-wave patterns at ultrasonic frequencies. As wind passes through the cavity, a change in the wave's property occurs (phase shift). By measuring the amount of phase shift in the received signals by each transducer, and then by mathematically processing the data, the sensor is able to provide an accurate horizontal measurement of wind speed and direction.

Another tool used to measure wind velocity includes a GPS combined with pitot tube. A fluid flow velocity tool, the Pitot tube is primarily used to determine the air velocity of an aircraft.

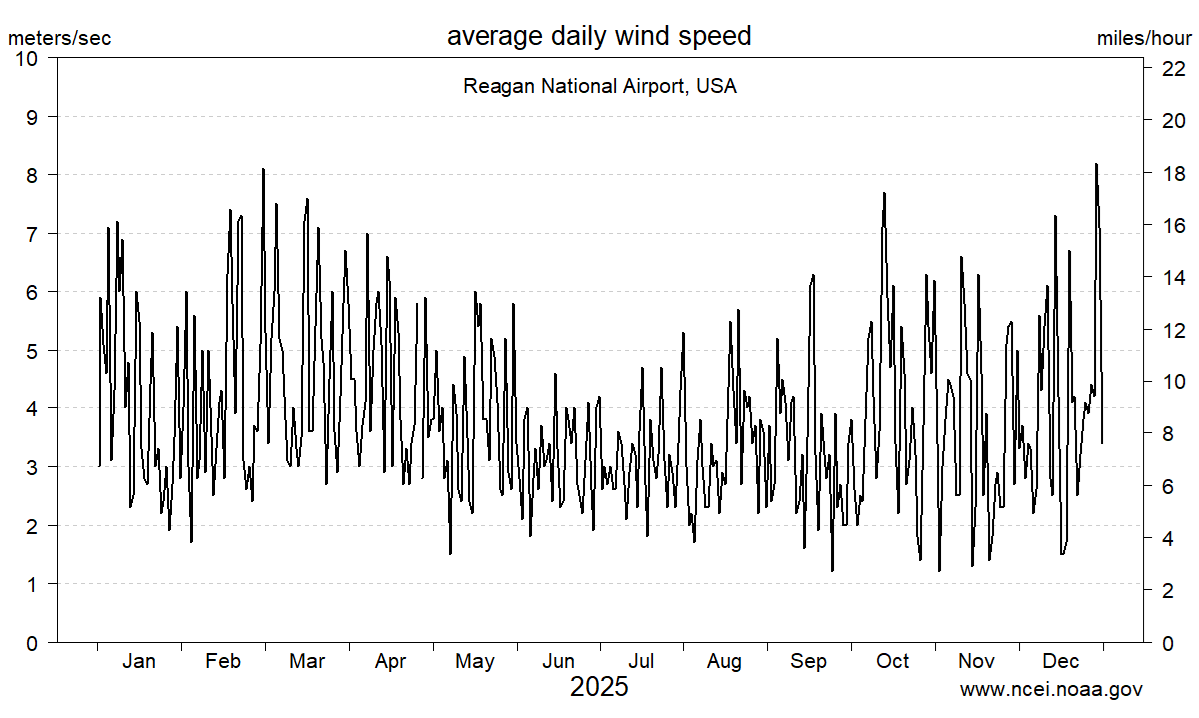
Average daily wind speed at Ronald Reagan Washington National Airport, Virginia, USA in 2025.

== Design of structures ==
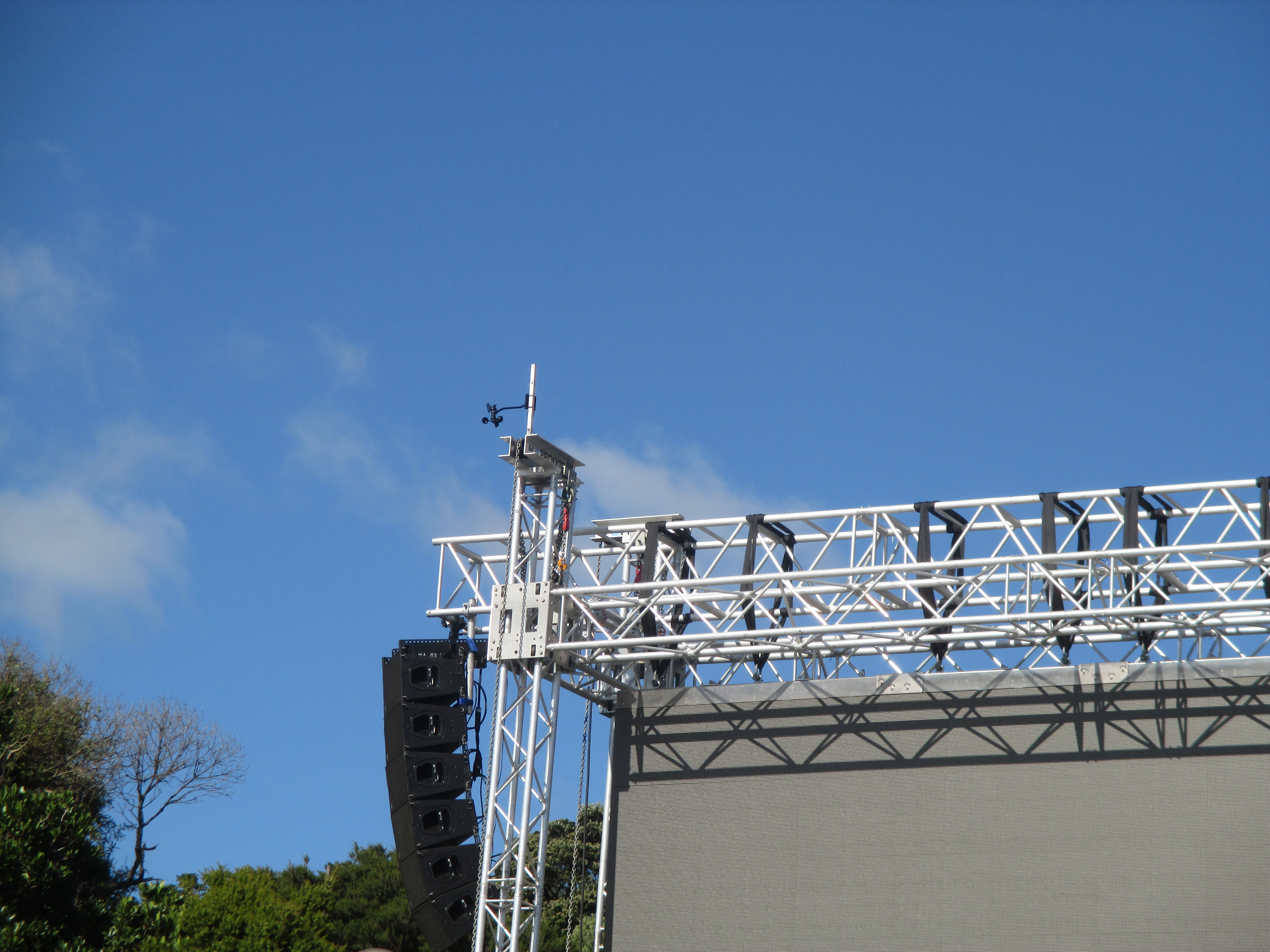
Anemometer on an outdoor stage set, to measure wind speed

Wind speed is a common factor in the design of structures and buildings around the world. It is often the governing factor in the required lateral strength of a structure's design.

In the United States, the wind speed used in design is often referred to as a "3-second gust", which is the highest sustained gust over a 3-second period having a probability of being exceeded per year of 1 in 50 (ASCE 7-05, updated to ASCE 7-16). This design wind speed is accepted by most building codes in the United States and often governs the lateral design of buildings and structures.

In Canada, reference wind pressures are used in design and are based on the "mean hourly" wind speed having a probability of being exceeded per year of 1 in 50. The reference wind pressure q is calculated using the equation q = ρv^{2} / 2, where ρ is the air density and v is the wind speed.

Historically, wind speeds have been reported with a variety of averaging times (such as fastest mile, 3-second gust, 1-minute, and mean hourly) which designers may have to take into account. To convert wind speeds from one averaging time to another, the Durst Curve was developed, which defines the relation between probable maximum wind speed averaged over some number of seconds to the mean wind speed over one hour.

== See also ==
- American Society of Civil Engineers (promulgator of ASCE 7-05, current version is ASCE 7-16)
- Beaufort scale
- Fujita scale and Enhanced Fujita Scale
- International Building Code (promulgator of NBC 2005)
- ICAO recommendations – International System of Units
- Knot (unit)
- Prevailing wind
- Saffir–Simpson Hurricane Scale
- TORRO scale
- Wind direction
