= Niccolò Circignani =

Italian painter (c. 1517/24–after 1596)

- Dome of Santa Pudenziana, Rome
- Born: c. 1517/1524; Pomarance, Duchy of Florence
- Died: after 1596; Rome, Papal States
- Other name: Niccolò Pomarancio
- Education: Daniele da Volterra and Santi di Tito
- Occupation: Painter
- Movement: Renaissance; Mannerism

Niccolò Circignani (c. 1517/1524 – after 1596), also called il Pomarancio, was an Italian painter of the late-Renaissance or Mannerist period.

== Biography ==
Born in Pomarance, he is one of three Italian painters called Pomarancio. The date of his birth is not recorded. According to Baglione he died aged 72 during the pontificate of Sixtus V (1585-90), which implies a birth-date c. 1513-18. He was an apprentice under the mannerist painters Daniele da Volterra and Santi di Tito in Rome. His first works are documented from the 1560s, where he painted frescos on the history of Nebuchadnezzar for the Vatican Belvedere (Museo Etrusco, Sala III), working alongside Santi di Tito and Giovanni de' Vecchi. He also completed altarpieces for Orvieto (1570), Umbertide (1572), Città di Castello (1573–1577) as well as Città della Pieve.

In the 1560s, he worked at Orvieto Cathedral with Hendrick van den Broeck, a brother of the sculptor Willem van den Broecke and a relative of the painter Chrispijn van den Broeck. In the same period he painted frescoes (1568) in the church of the Maestà delle Volte in Perugia, the Resurrection (1569; Santuario della Madonna di Mongiovino, Panicale) and an Annunciation (1577, now in the Pinacoteca Comunale, Città di Castello). Starting 1574, he painted frescoes on mythologic themes including a Judgement of Paris, Stories from the Aeneid, and others, in collaboration with Giovanni Antonio Pandolfi in the Palazzo della Corgna in Castiglione del Lago.

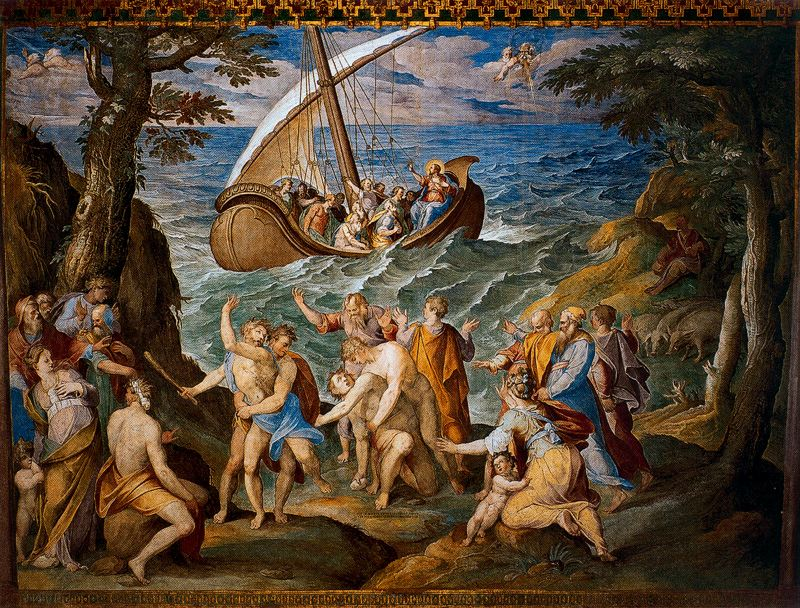
Jesus Calms the Storm, fresco in the Gregorian Tower in the Vatican.

From 1579 he returned to Rome to work with Matthijs Bril and decorated the Sala della Meridiana in the Gregorian Tower (finished before the end of 1580) as well as in the Vatican loggias (1580–83) in the Vatican. Now an established artist, he became a member of the Accademia di San Luca on 8 October 1581. He became one of the artists favored by the Jesuits, for whom he frescoed the Chapel of St. Francis Borgia in the Church of the Gesù (1584–7). In 1581–2, with help from Matteo da Siena and Antonio Tempesta, later Antonio Tempesta, Circignani executed a grafic fresco cycles depicting early Christian and Jesuit martyrdoms for the church of Santo Stefano Rotondo. Charles Dickens expressed horror at the spectacle in this church.

Circignani's final works in Rome, the frescoes depicting the Angelic Concert with the Eternal Father in Santi Giovanni e Paolo al Celio (1587) and Celestial Glory on the dome of Santa Pudenziana (1588), demonstrate a stylistic progression from late Mannerism to a more monumental, pre-Baroque style. He continued to work in central Italy throughout the 1590s. His last documented painting, in Cascia, dates from 1596. His son, Antonio Circignani, a prominent late-Mannerist painter, was deeply influenced by his father's style.

== Gallery ==
Scene from the fresco cycle History of Nebuchadnezzar in the Cortile del Belvedere

Scene from the fresco cycle History of Nebuchadnezzar in the Cortile del Belvedere

St. Francis meets the Sultan, San Giovanni dei Fiorentini, Rome

The Assumption of the Virgin, Palazzo dell'Opera della Primaziale Pisana, Pisa

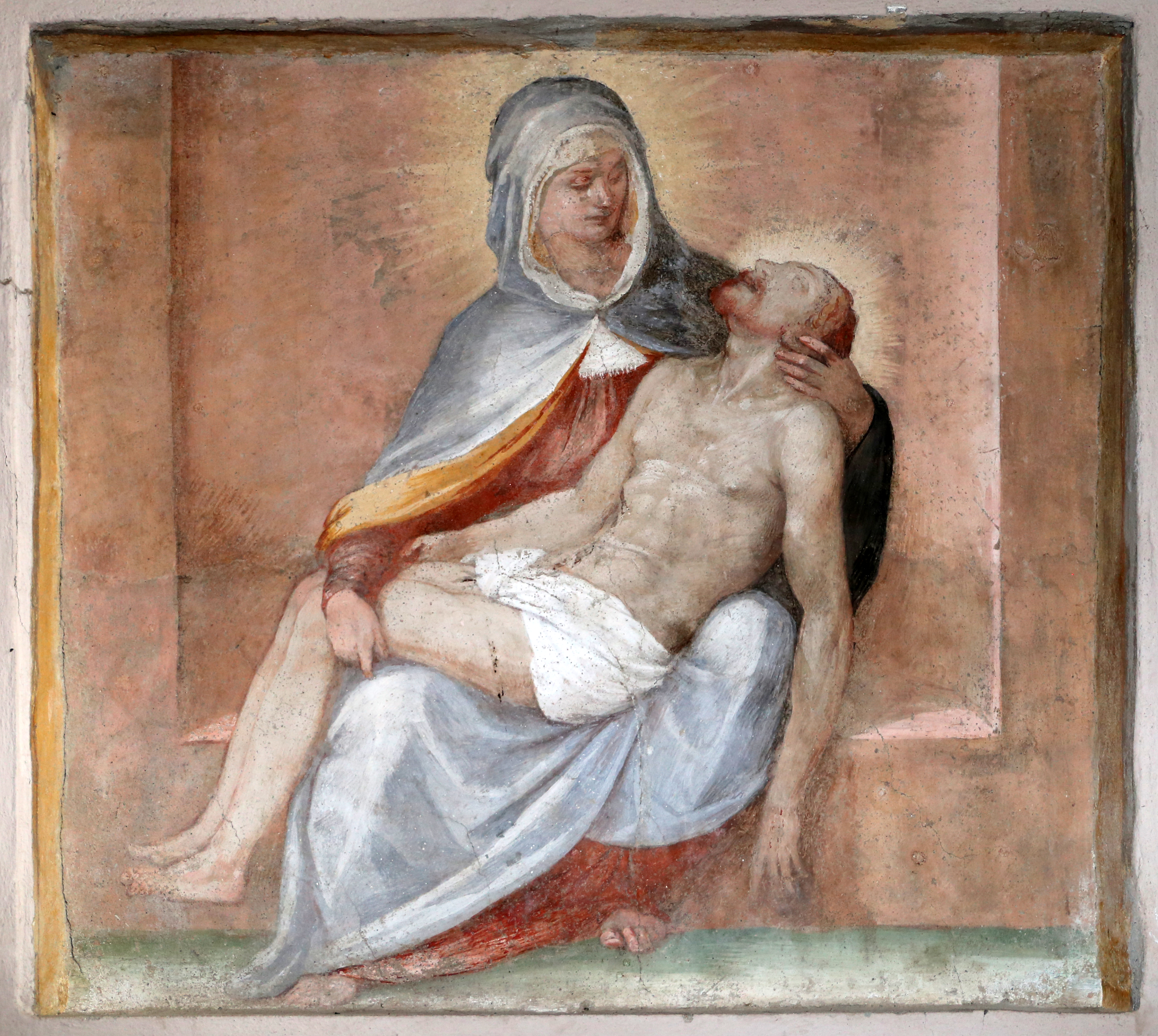
Pietà, San Francesco, Volterra

The Raising of Lazarus, Princeton University Art Museum

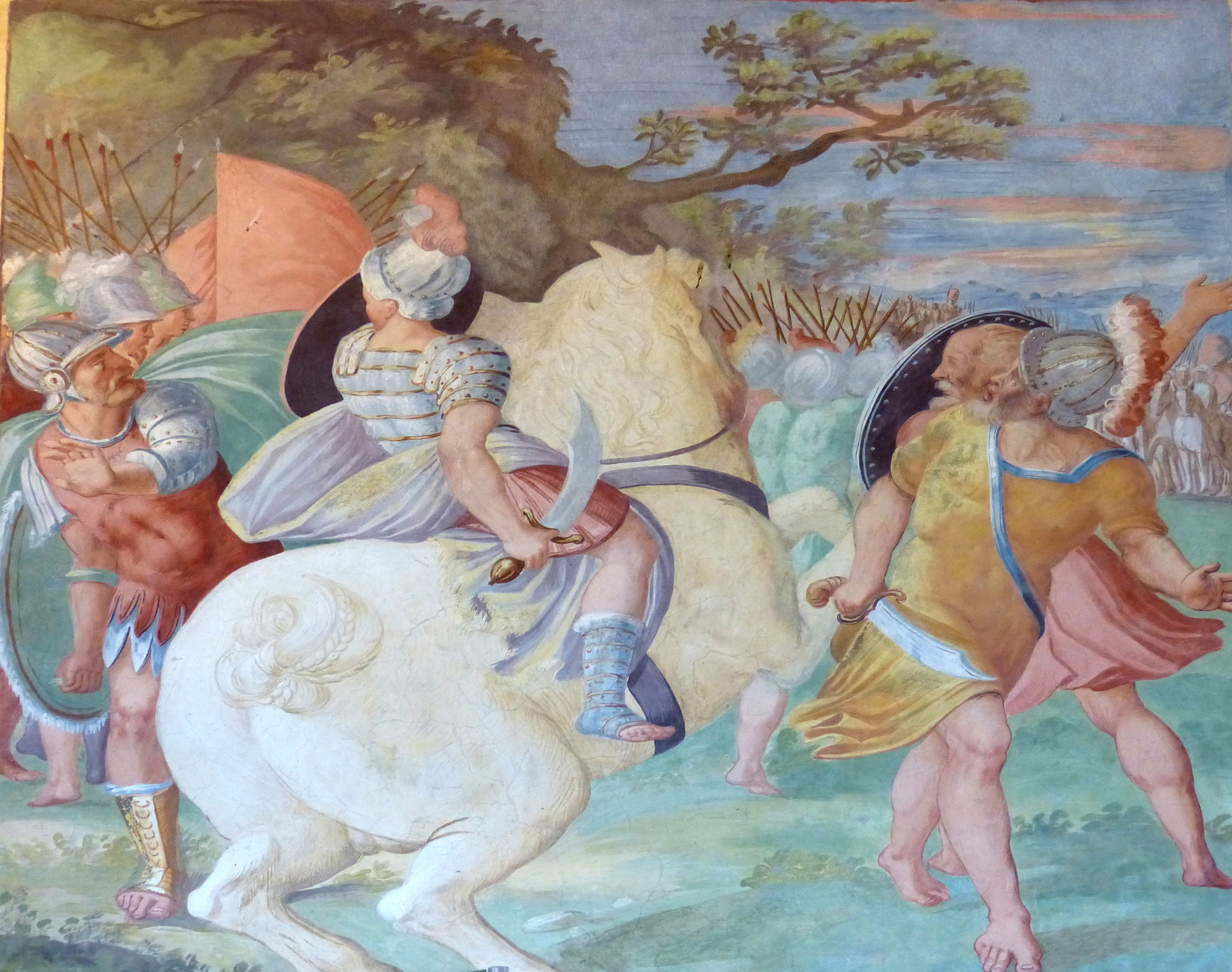
The Battle of Pharsalus, detail from Circignani's fresco cycle in Palazzo della Corgna, Castiglione del Lago

Sts. Paul, Peter and Pudens, fresco on the vault of Santa Pudenziana, Rome

== Sources ==
- Baglione, Giovanni (1642). Le vite de' pittori scultori et architetti dal pontificato di Gregorio XIII. Rome: Andrea Fei. pp. 41–2.
- Myers, Bernard S. (1955). "Pomarancio (Niccolò Circignani)". Encyclopedia of Painting: Painters and Painting of the World from Prehistoric Times to the Present Day. Crown Publishers. p. 397.
- Freedberg, Sydney J. (1993). Painting in Italy, 1500-1600. Pelican History of Art. Penguin Books. pp. 649–650.
- Garofoli, Marina (2003). "Pomarancio [Circignani], Niccolò". Grove Art Online. doi:10.1093/gao/9781884446054.article.T068551.
