= Stag Hunt =

Painting by Paul Bril

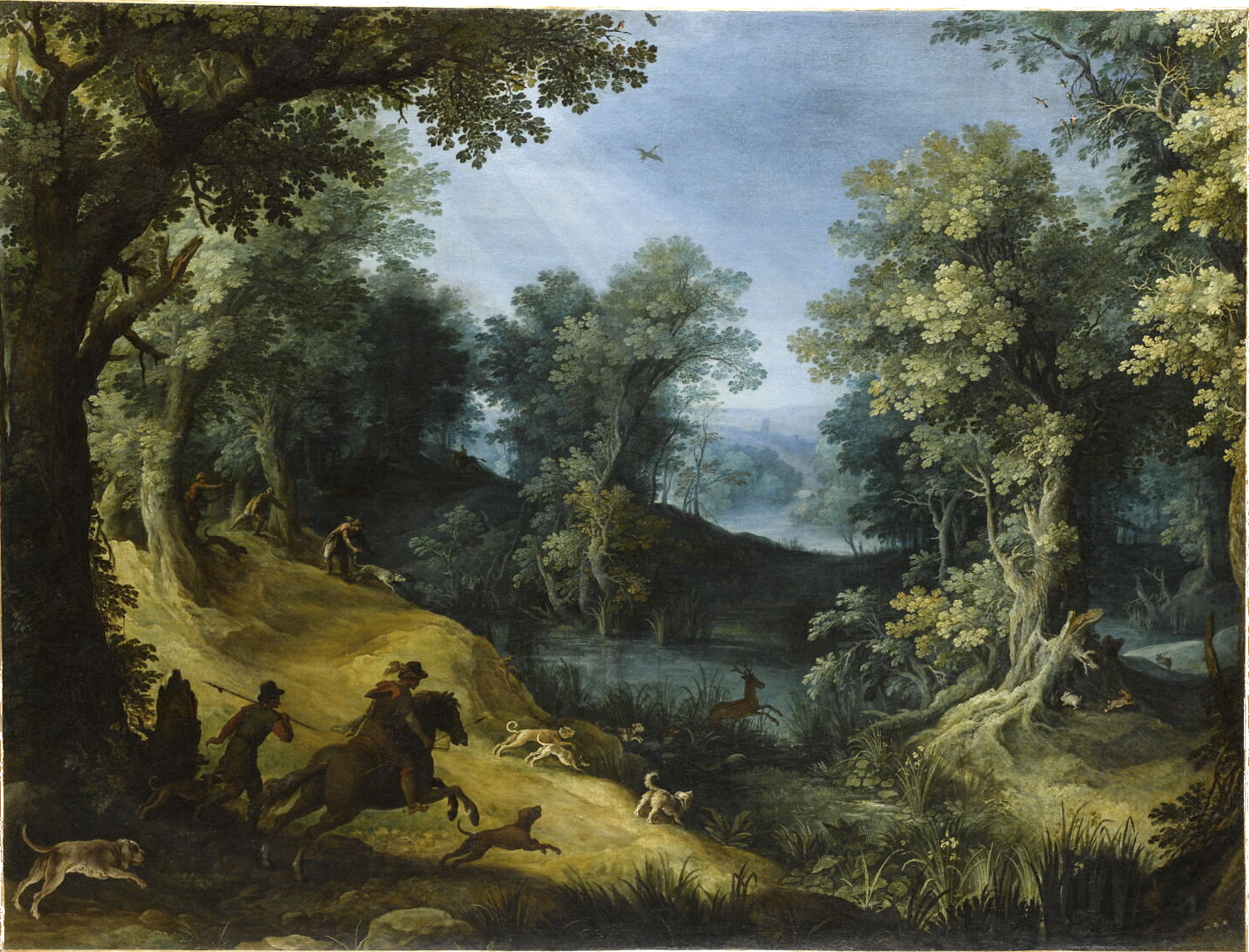
- Artist: Paul Bril
- Year: ca. 1590 – 1595
- Catalogue: INV. 1109
- Medium: Oil on canvas
- Dimensions: 105 cm × 137 cm (41.3 in × 53.9 in)
- Location: Louvre, Paris

Stag Hunt (French: Chasse au cerf) is an oil on canvas painting by Flemish painter Paul Bril. Probably painted in the 1590s, it is part of the collection of the Louvre in Paris. The painting was once in the collection of Louis XIV.

== Painting ==
Paul Bril completed the painting after moving in the late 1570s to Rome, where he joined his brother Matthijs who was already a successful painter there. In Rome, He went on to become the most influential landscapist artists of his time.

In his early landscapes Bril reflected the Flemish tradition, established by painters such as Joachim Patinir, Herri met de Bles and Pieter Bruegel the Elder. The early work of Hans Bol was also a source of inspiration for Bril.

Bril and the Flemish landscapists did not paint or draw studies en plein air. This painting, too, is a studio product from the artist's imagination. In the painting, six hunters are hunting down a stag into a marsh, illuminated by discernible rays of sunlight. Two hunters are riding a horse, one is in the foreground, the other is visible in a clearing among the trees closing the painting to the left, in the background. On the bottom right, some rabbits are running away or taking refuge below the rooted bank. From the rider's horse jumping forward in the foreground, the painting recedes, in a slanted and undulated view, to the bosky landscape visible through an opening. The strong colors and the skillful articulation thereof in the landscape as well as the quality of the animal animation are far superior to the "Fallow deer Hunt," (INV. 1108, also at the Louvre), formerly attributed to Bril and regarded as a pendant to the Stag Hunt. The painting was part of the collection of King Louis XIV of France, who acquired it from a merchant Alvarez in 1682.
