= Hendrick van den Broeck =

Flemish painter and sculptor (c. 1530–1597)

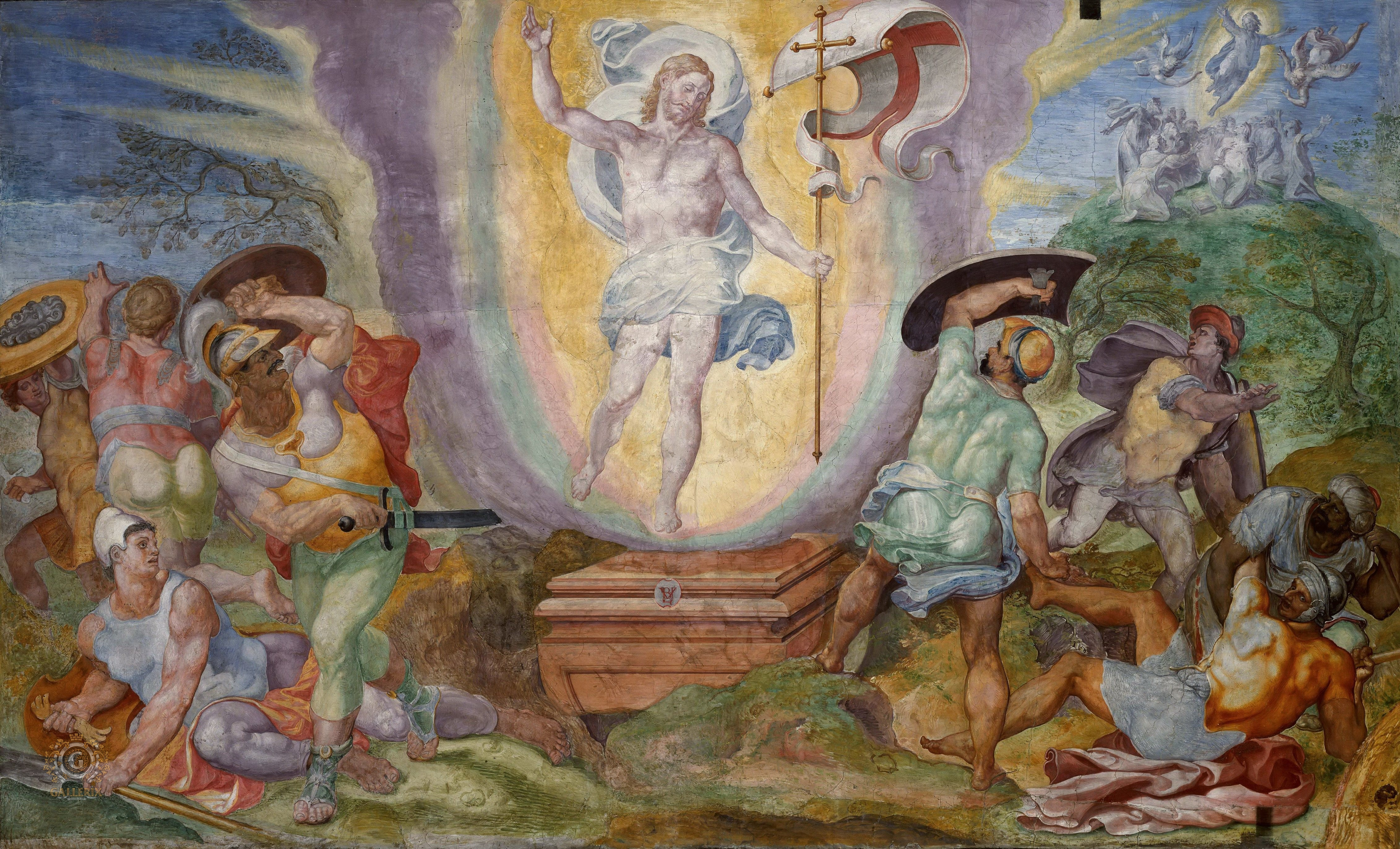
The resurrection of Christ

Hendrick van den Broeck or Arrigo Fiammingo (c. 1530 – 28 September 1597) was a Flemish painter, fresco painter, glass painter and sculptor of the late-Renaissance or Mannerist period. After training in Flanders, he travelled to Italy where he remained active in various cities for the remainder of his life. He was court painter to Cosimo I de Medici in Florence and worked as a fresco painter in Rome on the large decorative projects of pope Gregory XIII.

== Life ==
Hendrick van den Broeck was born in Mechelen as the son of Hendrick van den Broeck, of whom it is not known whether he was an artist. His family also used the Latinized name 'Paludanus'. The Latinized name is based on the Latin translation ('palus') of the Dutch word 'broeck', which is part of the family and means a marsh or swamp land. His family members included artists who were active in Mechelen. He was a brother of the sculptor Willem van den Broecke and the painters Joris and Pieter. The painter Chrispijn van den Broeck was likely a relative.

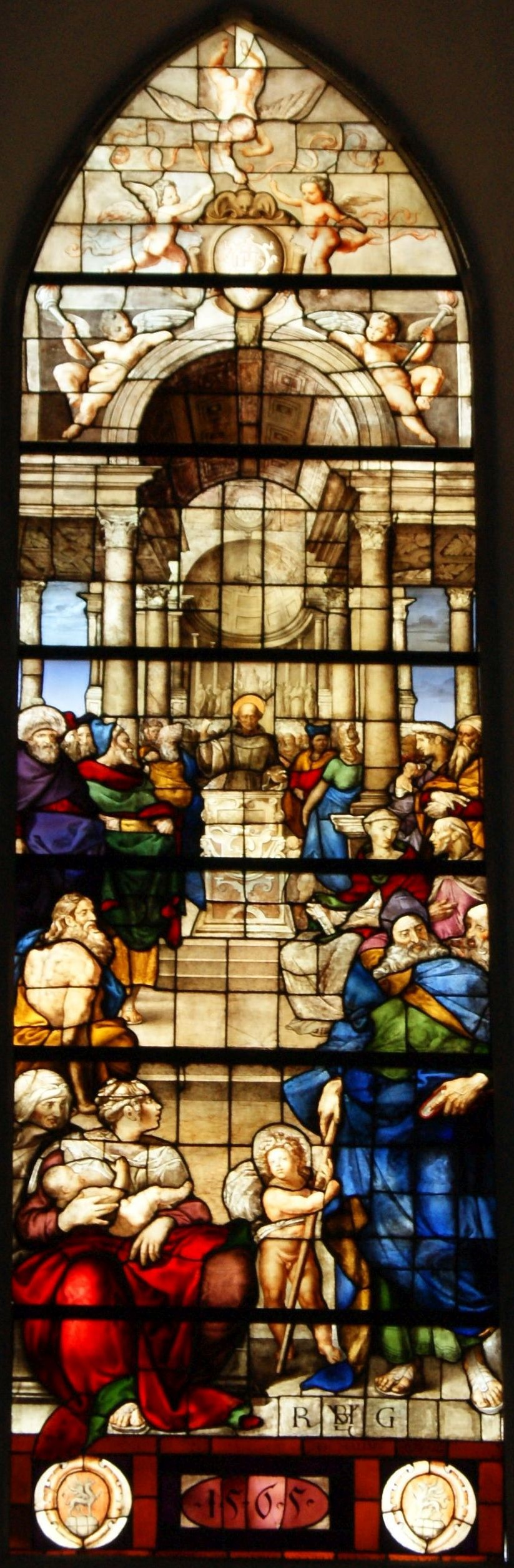
Saint Bernard of Siena preaching

Hendrick was a pupil of Frans Floris. Frans Floris was one of the Romanist painters active in Antwerp. The Romanists were Netherlandish artists who had trained in Italy and, upon their return, painted in a style that assimilated these Italian influences into the Northern painting tradition.

Around 1557, van den Broecke moved to Italy. Here he would remain for the remainder of his life, working in many different cities. It has been speculated that his frequent moves from one city to the other were motivated by his financial difficulties. In the years 1557 and 1558, he was in Florence, where he worked mainly as a glass painter on commissions for Duke Cosimo I de Medici and his court. The Flemish priest Adriaan de Witte, who was chaplain of the guard of the Duke, played a role in calling van den Broeck to the Ducal court. He principally worked on glass paintings. He was commissioned to paint four glass windows in the Sala degli Elementi (Room of the Elements} in the Palazzo Vecchio in Florence. Adriaan de Witte provided the iconographic program of the glass windows, which included allegories of Envy, Justice and Victory, with mottoes in Latin. The program was approved by the duke. The windows themselves were lost on an unknown date. Van den Broeck subsequently worked on glass paintings in the monastery complex of San Lorenzo. In the meantime, many monuments and buildings had come under the supervision of Cosimo's court. In 1558, van den Broeck supplied painted windows for the choir and the sacristy of San Lorenzo and also the Biblioteca Laurenziana. He remained active at this location until the early 1560s and worked there alongside another Flemish painter referred to as Gualtieri di Giovanni Battista Fiammingo.

While employed by the Ducal court, the young Hendrick was involved in an incident. He was provided with a supply of precious glass by the court. He had used part of the glass for other purposes without official permission. He had been forced to do so out of necessity as the court was slow in paying him for his work. Van den Broeck's employment at the court was in peril when the court investigated the matter of the missing glass. Adriaan de Witte helped him sort out the matter with the court. Witnessed the Ragionamenti of Vasari, Adrian's plan was subsequently also implemented. Hendrick may have been accompanied in Florence and Rome by his brother Willem.

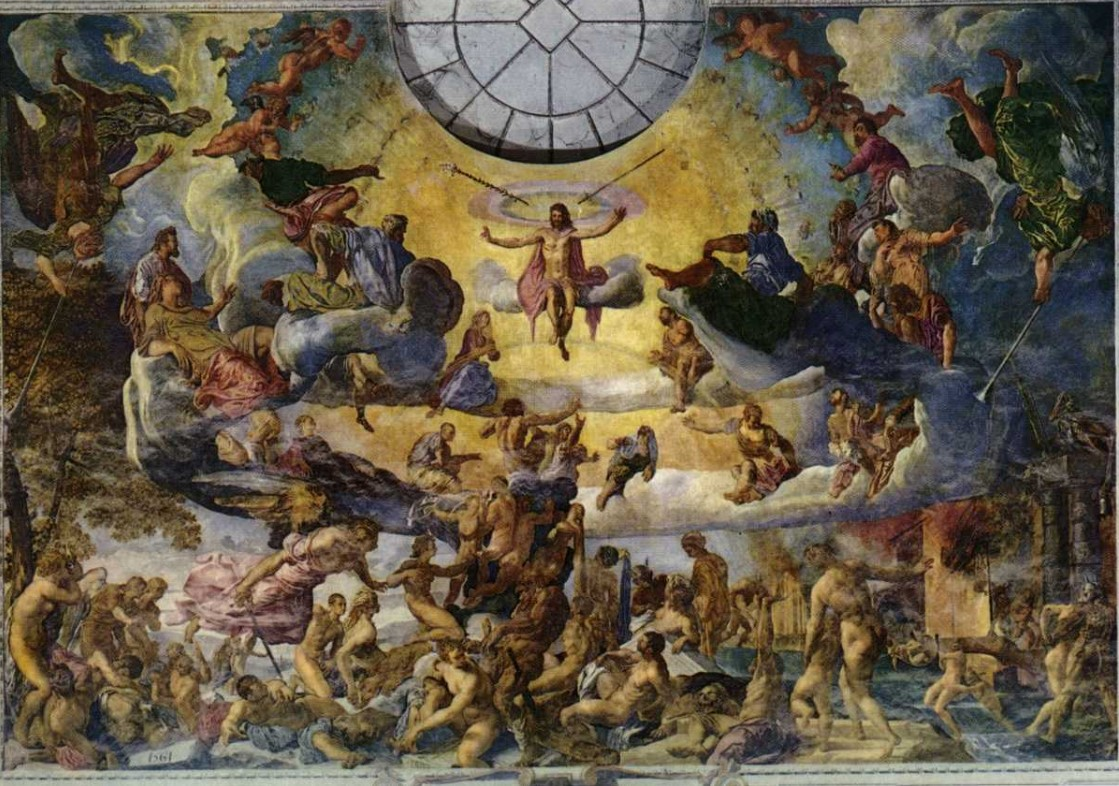
The Last Judgement

In Florence, he had the greatest trouble keeping his income and expenses in balance and providing for himself. He left for Rome where he worked for a few years. In 1561 he entered into a contract with the Opera of Orvieto Cathedral to provide decoration of the new altars in the nave. In 1565, he finally ruled out the possibility of creating the works himself on site. He suggested that his associate Niccolò Circignani paint the frescoes of one of the chapels while he would paint the altarpiece in Rome, where he was then residing. In the end Circignani also painted the altarpiece onsite.

He was commissioned in 1561 by Ranuccio Farnese, abbot commendatory of Farfa Abbey to paint a Last Judgement. Van den Broecke created a large canvas painting on the subject, which was influenced by Michelangelo's treatment of the same subject in the Sistine Chapel. This is particularly visible in the contorted bodies which are muscular and in an exalted state. The influence of the Venetian school is also visible in the nudes. Some sources attribute this work to the Dutch painter Dirck Barendsz. He worked for the first time in Perugia in 1562. Upon his return to Rome he searched for a new formula to get the attention of local patrons. He entered into a formal partnership with the painter Niccolò Circignani to collaborate on commissions.

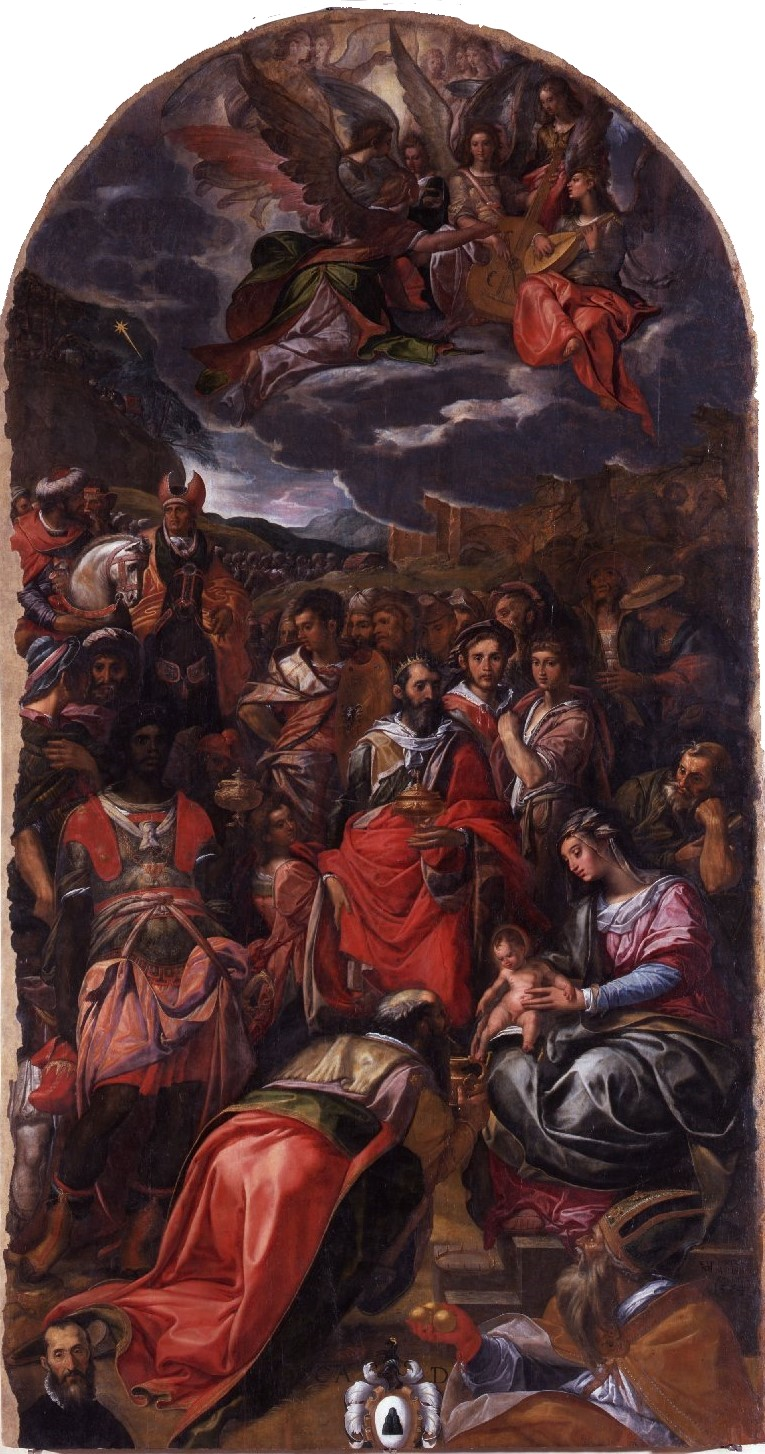
Adoration of the Magi

Duke Adriano Montemelini commissioned van den Broeck to paint the Adoration of the Magi (1564, now in the Galleria Nazionale dell'Umbria) for his chapel in the Church of San Francesco al Prato in Perugia. This work was criticized by Giorgio Vasari. El Greco disagreed with Vasari's view and admired this work. In 1565 he returned to Perugia where he was commissioned by Francesco Bossi, the Papal Governor in 1564–5, to restore frescos in the chapel or Capella dei Priori in the Palazzo dei Priori by Benedetto Bonfigli. He likely painted in the chapel the fresco of the Crucifixion with Saints Francis and Herculanus in which he included on the lower right a figure of Francesco Bossi in prayer. He received payment in 1565.

In 1565 he registered in the Confraternita of the Santa Maria della Pietà in Camposanto dei Teutonici, the national church of Germans and Flemish people in Rome. He was recorded in Napels in the years 1567 and 1568. Here he worked in the Catacombs of Saint Gaudiosus in 1567. In this city he painted the next year a Life of the Virgin in the Santi Severino e Sossio.

He was registered in the Compagnia di Santa Barbara in Florence in 1572.

He worked with Giorgio Vasari and 11 other artists on the decoration of the Sala Regia of the Vatican in Rome. He also worked on frescos in the Vatican Library. He worked under Cesare Nebbia to help decorate the Capella Sistina of Santa Maria Maggiore, as well as the better known Sistine Chapel in the Vatican complex, where he painted a Resurrection of Christ on thewall facing of the entrance, where previously there had been a painting by Domenico Ghirlandaio which had become damaged. This painting is located on the wall opposite Michelangelo's Last Judgment. Van den Broecke's commission for the Resurrection of Christ in the Sistine Chapel (1571–1572) is regarded by many as a lucky stroke for the artist as it gave him the opportunity to paint one of the most important scenes in the program of decorations of the Sistine Chapel.

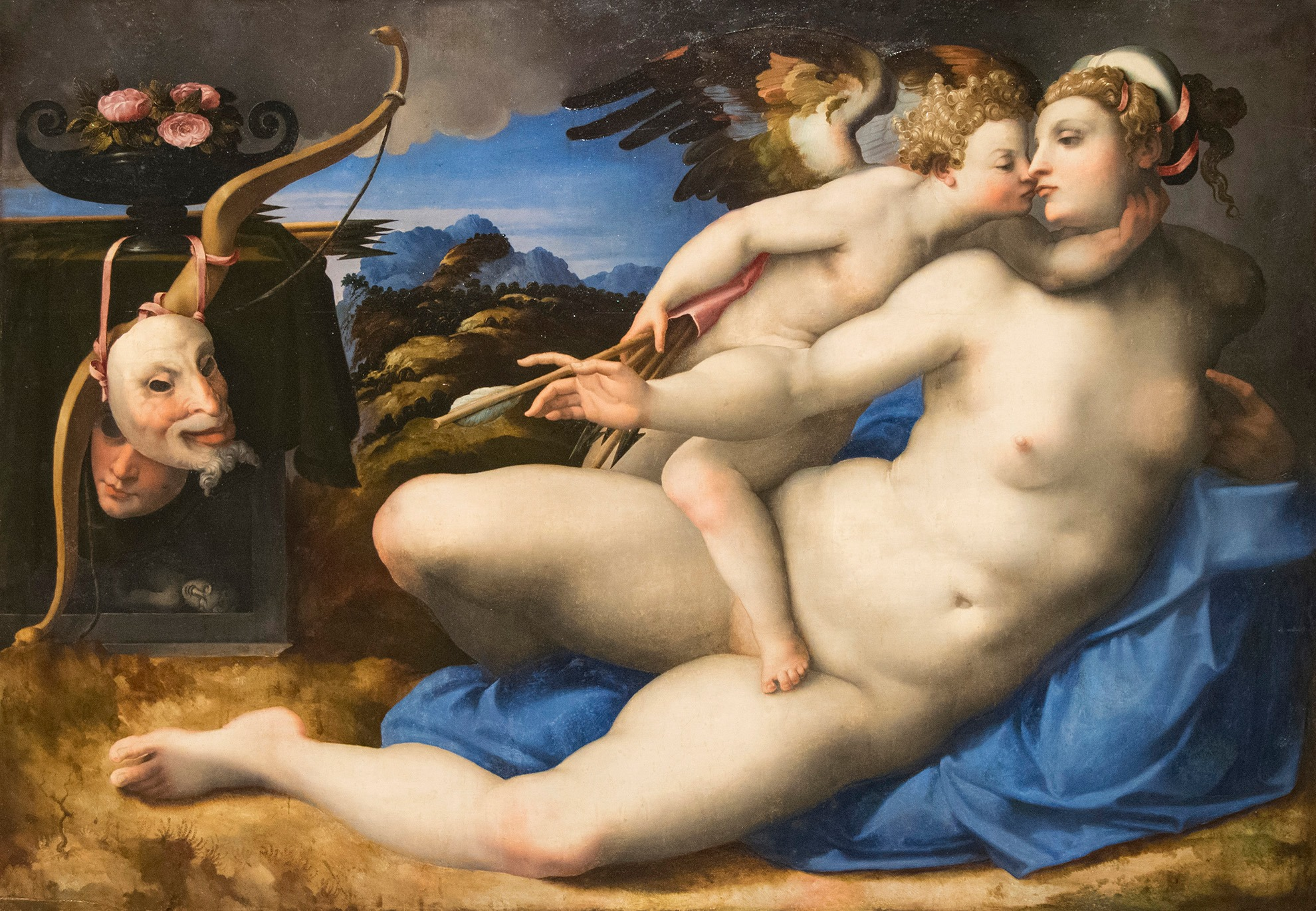
Venus Kissed by Cupid

There are gaps in the surviving records on his activities, especially in the period 1575 to 1579. Possibly he was working in Florence during this period. In the cash books of the Brotherhood of Saint Barbara (Compagnia di Santa Barbara) in Florence an Arrigo fiamingo - without specifying surname or profession - was registered for five years, the last time in 1580. This does not necessarily contradicted by the fact that Hendrick received a commission for frescoes in Rome in 1579 and was also registered in the Brotherhood of the Flemish community there in December of that year. The next year he was admitted to the Accademia di San Luca and remained active in Rome and Umbria for many years.

He was recorded in 1578 in Perugia where he obtained citizenship on 24 September 1579. During the period from 1580 to 1597 he made frescoes in the Cappella Sisitina in Santa Maria Maggiore (1587) and in the Vatican Library (1589). He worked in 1588 in Perugia where he was assisted by Johannes Wraghe II another Flemish expatriate.

He married Antonia Dunan, who was from Burgundy. He died in Rome. His date of death, 28 September 1597, is recorded in the records of the parish of Saint Roch in Rome.

== Work ==
Hendrick van den Broeck was a prolific and multi-faceted artist who practised as a painter, fresco painter, glass painter and sculptor. He may have been forced by economic reasons to try his hand at various techniques. These financial difficulties likely also explain his frequent moves from one city to the other in Italy.

He worked in a Mannerist style influenced by Michelangelo and the Venetian school.
