= Gregorian Tower =

Square tower in Vatican City

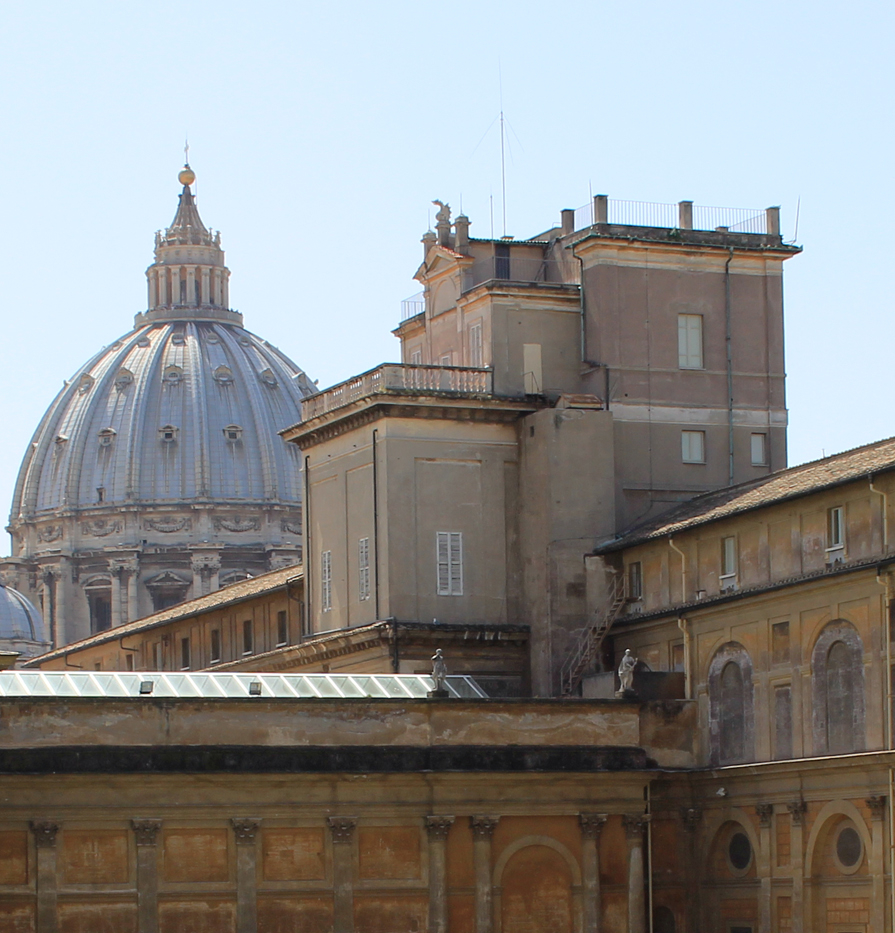
- Gregorian Tower (with the dome of Saint Peter's basilica in the background)
- Click on the map to see marker

General information
- Location: Vatican City
- Coordinates: 41°54′18.5″N 012°27′14.9″E

Design and construction
- Architect(s): Ottaviano Mascherino

The Gregorian Tower (Italian: Torre Gregoriana) or Tower of the Winds (Italian: Torre dei Venti) is a square tower and early modern observatory located above the Gallery of Maps, which connects the Villa Belvedere with the Apostolic Palace in Vatican City. The tower was built between 1578 and 1580 to a design by the Bolognese architect Ottaviano Mascherino (who was credited with building the Apostolic Palace) mainly to promote the study of astronomy for the Gregorian Calendar Reform which was commissioned by Pope Gregory XIII and promulgated in 1582. It was then also known as the Tower of Winds. The tower was also called "Specola Astronomica Vaticana", a reference to the Vatican Observatory. Four stages of progressive development have occurred since it was first established. The tower was an edifice of great value for astronomical observations made using a sundial as they provided essential confirmation of the need to reform the Julian calendar.

== Early history ==
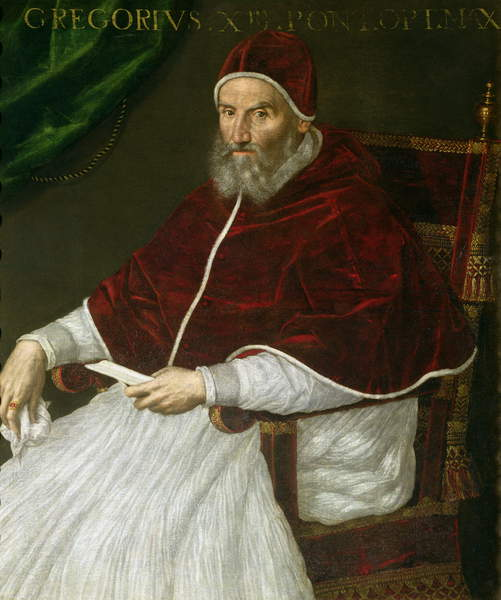
Pope Gregory XIII (Pope from 1572 to 1585) who established the Gregorian Calendar and the Gregorian Tower.

The first stage of building of the tower, as recorded by Leo XIII in his motu proprio Ut mysticam of 1891, is credited to Pope Gregory XIII, Pope from 1572 to 1585. The directive was to build a tower at a suitable location in the Vatican and equip it with the "greatest and best instruments of the time". The design was effected after a series of meetings of the experts who had been appointed to reform the Julian calendar, in use since 45 BC, to verify their proposed reforms. Fr. Christoph Clavius, a Jesuit mathematician from the Roman College, was the expert on the committee who suggested the new system for the observations. The 73 metres (240 ft) tower was then built above the museum and library, flanked by the Belvedere and della Pigna courtyards. The instrumentation for the observation of the sun rays falling over it consisted of a meridian line designed by Ignazio Danti of Perugia. It was in the form of a circular marble plate in the centre, embellished with scientific designs. The tower still remains today, but has undergone improvements over the centuries.

== Second stage ==
The second stage of construction in the 17th and 18th centuries, when the tower was under the charge of the Vatican librarian, involved Mgr. Filippo Luigi Gilii, a clergyman of St. Peter's Basilica. Earlier in 1797, Pius VI gave approval to placing a Latin inscription Specula Vaticana at the entrance to the upper part of the tower, which was implemented by Cardinal Zelada with plans to enhance the instrumentation system in the tower's observatory. The original observatory was then set up above the second level of the tower with the agreement of Pope Pius VI. Its instrumentation, apart from many normal devices (such as meteorological and magnetic equipment, with a seismograph and a small transit and pendulum clock,) was noted for the Dolland Telescope. The instrumentation facilitated recording of occurrences of eclipse, appearance of comets, Satellites of Jupiter and Mercury’s transit. As an addition, under the patronage of Pope Pius X, four rotary observatory domes were also added at strategic locations on the 1,300 feet (400 m) long fortification walls, more than a thousand years old. Mgr. Gilii, highly respected as a polyglot with a knowledge of physics, biology, archeology and the Hebrew language, was in charge of the observatory from 1800 to 1821. He carried out continuous meteorological observations (twice a day at 6 AM and 2 PM) conforming to the programme of the Mannheim Meteorological Society. While the observation records for seven years were published, the balance data in a manuscript form was preserved in the Vatican Library. Subsequent to Gilii's death in 1821, the observatory on the tower was discontinued and the instruments were moved to the observatory at the Roman College. Established in 1787, it was considered more suitable for making observations than the Vatican.

== Third stage ==
The revival of the observatory on the Gregorian Tower was initiated by the Barnabite Francesco Denza with the approval of Pope Leo XIII. High quality instruments were procured, partly with generous donations from Hicks of London, and the automatic recording instruments were procured from Richard in Paris. A four-inch equatorial, a three-inch transit instrument, and four pendulum clocks with two chronometers, were also procured from the observatory at Modena. In 1888, the gift of a 16 inch long telescope to Pope Leo XIII, became a part of the observatory. Father Denza joined the observatory in 1889 after it was upgraded with more modern instruments. The same year, a second tower was built some 400 metres (1,300 ft) away from the main Gregorian Tower, overlooking the Vatican Gardens behind St. Peter's Basilica on the south-west border. It was built to a diameter of 17 metres (56 ft) with a lower wall thickness of 4.5 metres (15 ft), which could bear the load of a 13-inch photographic refractor, newly procured from Paris. Augustinian Father Rodriguez was the expert meteorologist who held the post of director from 1898 to 1905. In 1891, Pope Leo XIII, promulgating the motu proprio Ut mysticam, designated the second tower as the seat of the newly established Vatican Observatory, a decision which required altering the roof to provide a flat terrace for astronomical observations.

== Fourth stage ==
The fourth stage involved remedying the problem of communicating between the two towers during the time of Pope Pius X. His plans were to make the Gregorian Tower into a historical tower and to record and carry out observations at the second tower by linking the two towers along the fortified wall with a 83 metres (272 ft) iron bridge spanning the gap. At the west end of this bridge, a four-inch equatorial was installed on semicircular bastion. The east end of the bridge, above the barracks of the gendarmes, had a heliograph, with a camera attached, used to photograph the Sun (photoheliograph). A new 16-inch visual telescope, called Torre Pio X, was erected in the second tower. As a result of these modifications, the original library was moved to the Pontifical Academy Lincei, and the old meteorological and seismic instruments were shifted to the Valle di Pompei observatory. The new Astronomical Library was housed in two rooms of the building. The two new Repsold machines were used for recording on the astrographic plates. The recorded observations were published along with explanatory notes together with the last two series of the atlas of stars. Charts were printed on silver bromide paper.

== Features ==
The tower had two floors and a mezzanine. On the first floor was the famous Sundial Room or Meridian Room, which was initially an open loggia. Pope Urban VIII had it enclosed and it was subsequently decorated with long sequences of frescoes painted between 1580 and 1582 by Simon Lagi and the two Flemish artists Paul and Matthijs Bril. Today the tower has paintings by Niccolò Circignani and Matteino da Siena.

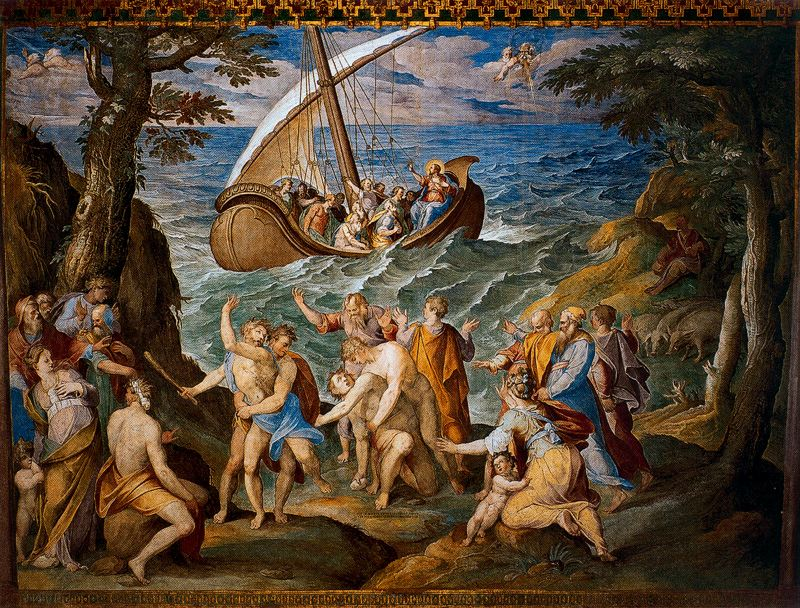
Jesus Calms the Storm, fresco by Niccolò Circignani in the Meridian Hall.

The Sundial Room, also called the Meridian Hall, was once the residence of Queen Christina of Sweden, then newly converted to Catholicism. The room was further modified by two additions which gave it its current name: a sundial, and a delicate but sophisticated anemoscope to measure the wind, which was fixed to the ceiling of the Meridian Hall. These were created by Ignazio Danti, the papal cosmographer, in association with the Gregorian Calendar Reform. The sundial consisted of a straight line in white marble running across the floor in a north–south direction, intended to measure the height of the Sun at noon according to the seasons of the year. The observations made with the sundial provided essential confirmation of the need to reform the Julian calendar. The anemoscope, in contrast, was a complex mechanism attached to the ceiling which was used to measure the strength and direction of the wind but soon stopped functioning. The instrument may have led to the other name of the tower, Tower of the Winds; however, an ancient observatory at Athens was also called the Tower of the Winds and might have been the source for inspiration.

The interior walls and ceiling of the hall were richly decorated, in some cases with gaudy frescoes of the hills and Roman countryside, the Pantheons, religious themes, the buildings surrounding the area, and naval shipwrecks with Jesus calming the storm and so forth.

== See also ==
- Vatican Observatory
- List of Jesuit sites
