= Matthijs Bril =

Flemish painter

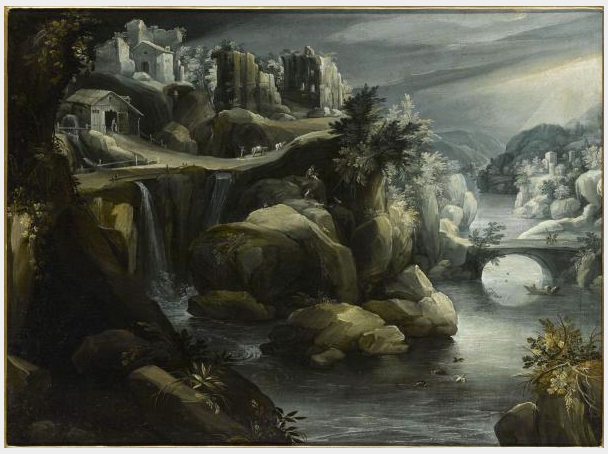
Landscape, attributed to Matthijs Bril

Matthijs Bril or Matthijs Bril the Younger (1550 – 8 June 1583) was a Flemish painter and draughtsman of landscapes. He spent most of his active career in Rome where his drawings of ancient Roman sites played an important role in the development of topographical landscape art. He was also a painter of capricci (architectural fantasies), with typical rustic hills with a few ruins. He died young and his younger brother Paul Bril, who had joined him in Rome, finished his commissions.

== Life ==
Matthijs was born in Antwerp, the son of the painter Matthijs Bril the Elder. Matthijs and his younger brother Paul Bril likely started their artistic training with their father in Antwerp. Matthijs moved to Rome probably around 1575.

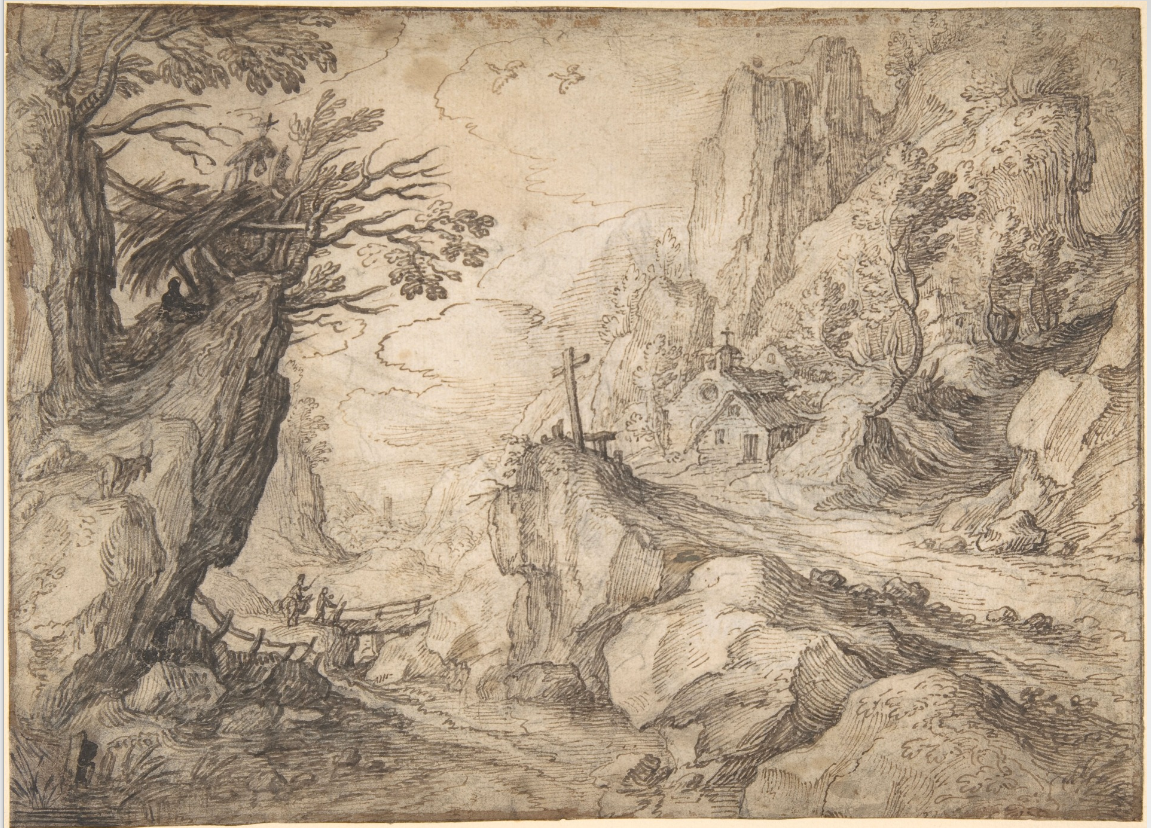
Mountainous river landscape with a hermit and chapel

In Rome he worked on several frescoes in the Vatican Palace including the Views of Rome with the Translation of the Remains of St. Gregory Nazianzus, executed soon after the actual transfer of the saint's remains in June 1580. Matthijs was joined by his younger brother Paul probably around or after 1582.

Mathijs Bril's second project in Rome was in the Tower of the Winds. This building in the Vatican Palace was built between 1578 and 1580 after a design by the Bolognese architect Ottaviano Mascherino as an astronomical observatory to study the Gregorian Calendar Reform implemented by pope Gregory XIII. With the assistance of his brother Paul, Matthijs Bril decorated four rooms with biblical cycles in landscape friezes and two rooms with topographical views of Rome and imaginary vedute within an illusionistic framework. He also painted landscapes in two rooms of the Palazzo Orsini in Monterotondo (north of Rome), which he signed with small glasses (a pun on his surname as the Flemish word 'bril' means 'glasses').

When Matthijs died in Rome in 1583, his brother continued his work, picking up many of Matthijs' commissions.

== Work ==
Matthijs Bril's work is now mainly known through his frescoes and drawings. Matthijs was specialized in landscapes. He painted two types of landscapes: landscapes with a topographical interest and imaginary landscapes.

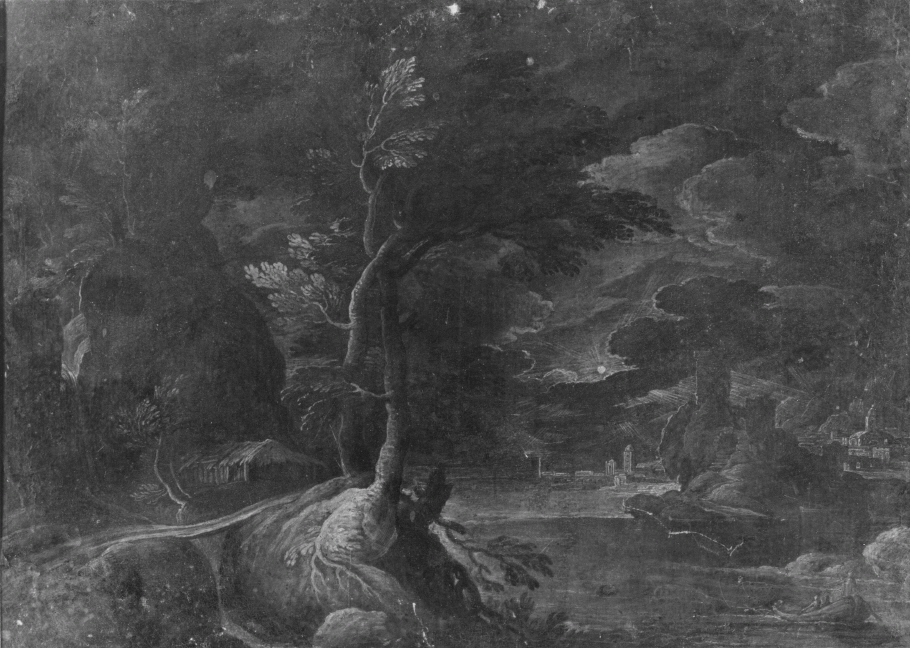
Moonlight landscape

Matthijs contributed to the genre of topographical painting in combining close attention to detail with a perspective that highlights the monumentality of the depicted buildings. The latter was achieved by using a lowered viewpoint and dynamic recession into the distance of the depicted object.

His imaginary landscapes without a topographical interest are more typically Mannerist in their close observation of nature and dramatic contrasts of light and dark. Their palette is dominated by acid blues and greens and the brushwork is impressionistic. These imaginary landscapes were used by his brother Paul and others as an inspiration for their work. These paintings are now known through a series of prints made by the Dutch engraver Simon Frisius. They were published in 1611 and 1613–14 in two volumes under the title Topographia Variarum Regionum.

Matthijs was a prolific draughtsman and his drawings are a principal source of information on his work. Many of his drawings were kept by his brother Paul and copied by contemporaries, such as Jan Brueghel the Elder.

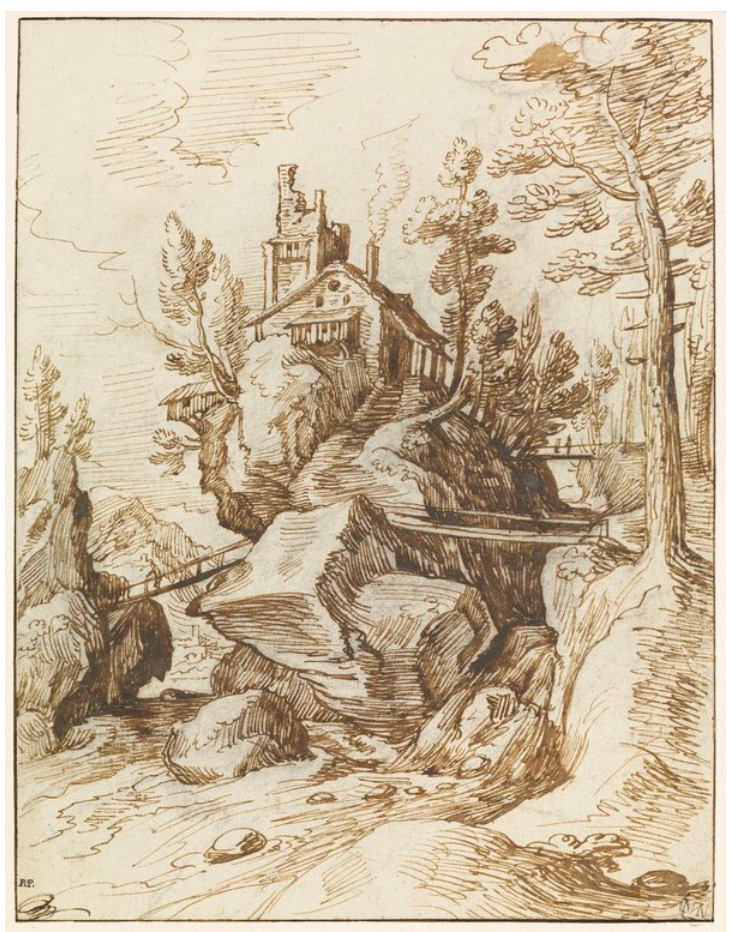
Dwelling on top of a rock in the middle of a river

Matthijs is known to have collaborated with the Italian painters Antonio Tempesta, Niccolo Circignani and Matteo da Siena on various projects.

== Sources ==
- Peter and Linda Murray, The Penguin Dictionary of Art and Artists. Fifth Edition: Revised and Enlarged (Penguin Books, London, 1988), 51.
- Carla Hendriks, Northern Landscapes on Roman Walls: The Frescoes of Matthijs and Paul Bril. (Florence : Centro Di della Edifimi, c2003).
- Anton Mayer, Das Leben und die Werke der Brueder Matthaeus und Paul Brill. (Leipzig: K.W. Hiersemann, 1910).
