= Willem van den Broecke =

Flemish sculptor, painter, draughtsman and architect (1530–1579)

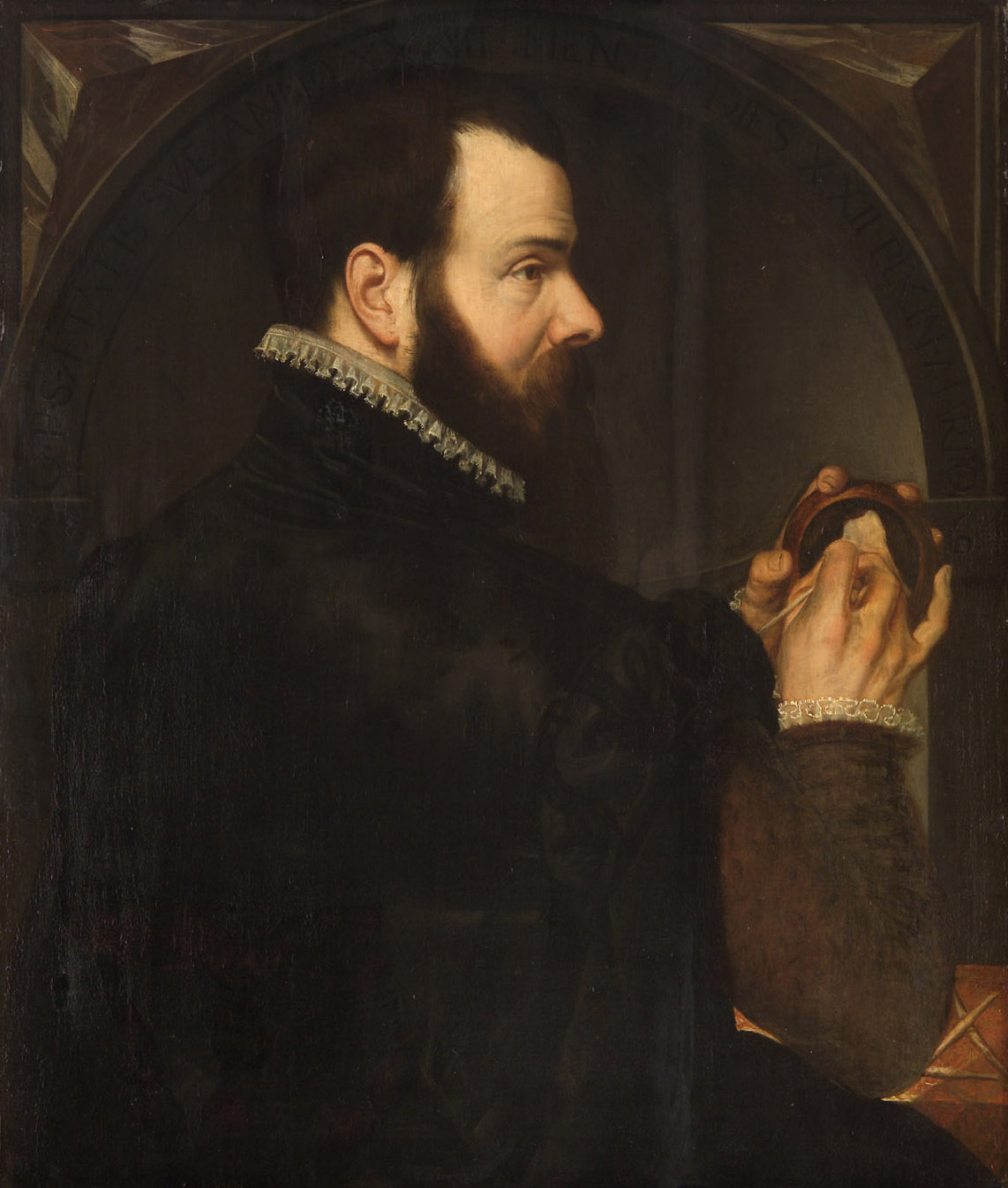
Self-portrait while Molding Wax

Willem van den Broecke, Willem van den Broeck or Guillelmus Paludanus (1530 – 1579) was a Flemish sculptor, painter, draughtsman and architect. He was a scion of a family of artists, which had its origins in Mechelen and some members of which later moved to Antwerp. Willem was active in Antwerp and also worked and likely trained in Italy for a long period. He was known for his small scale works, many of which were executed in alabaster. He was, along with Cornelis Floris, the leading sculptor in Antwerp in the second half of the 16th century. He was also one of the designers of the Antwerp City Hall. He enjoyed the patronage of an elite international clientele of church institutions, Spanish nobility, princes of Protestant territories as well as patricians from Augsburg.

== Life ==
Willem van den Broecke was born in Mechelen as the son of Hendrick van den Broeck, of whom it is not known whether he was an artist. His family members included artists who were active in Mechelen. His family also used the Latinized name 'Paludanus'. The Latinized name is based on the Latin translation ('palus') of the Dutch word 'broeck' (forming part of his family name) which means a marsh or swamp land. He was a brother of the painters Hendrick van den Broeck, Joris and Pieter. The painter Chrispijn van den Broeck was likely a relative. It is not known with whom Willem trained but it is believed he initially trained in his hometown.

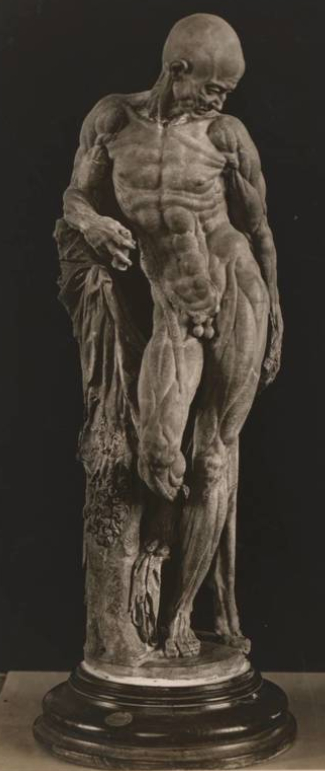
Anatomical study

Willem likely continued his studies in Antwerp in the workshop of Claudius or Cornelis Floris and may have travelled to Italy before 1557. He may have lived there in Rome and in Florence where his brother worked and in other cities. He was registered as a master sculptor in the Antwerp Guild of St. Luke in the year 1557. He became a citizen of Antwerp in 1559. In an active career spanning 20 years he developed an international network among the intellectual, artistic and ruling elite of his time. He received commissions from local as well as foreign patrons. The commissions executed for patrons in Augsburg in 1560 were likely shipped from Antwerp rather than created in Augsburg.

In the years 1566 and 1567 he sculpted three figures for the cathedral of Antwerp. He was further able to secure the patronage of the Duke of Alba, the Governor of the Netherlands in the period 1567–1573, and the Duke's court in Brussels. He enjoyed the protection of the Spanish humanist Benito Arias Montano who resided temporarily in Antwerp and helped him with his contacts at the court. In 1571 the Duke of Alba commissioned a larger-than-life statue of himself to commemorate his reconquest of a large part of the Netherlands and in particular his defeat of the rebels at Jemgum in 1568. The monument was executed by Willem van den Broecke and the Antwerp sculptor Jacob Jongheling after a program proposed by Arias Montanus, that was inspired by Piero Valeriano's Hieroglyphica of 1556. The statue was to be placed inside the citadel of Antwerp, which the Duke himself had built earlier. It depicts Alba in the guise of a Christian Hercules. The statue was upon its completion condemned by both the Spanish rulers and the Dutch regime as an improper expression of pride. The pursuit of glory in a ruler - and in particular, a subordinate thereof - was regarded as unbecoming under the Christian and classical principles upheld by the Spanish and Dutch courts. The statue was seen as nothing less than an act of self-glorification by Alba, which bordered on disloyalty. After the Duke was recalled to Spain, the statue was dismantled without pomp in 1574 and subsequently destroyed. Some prints made before the destruction of the statue show what it looked like. Through the Brussels court he also obtained in 1571 a commission to make a reja (stone enclosure or fence) for a monastery in Alba de Tormes. Although he worked on the designs for this project and received several payments for it, it is not clear whether it was ever finished by van den Broecke.

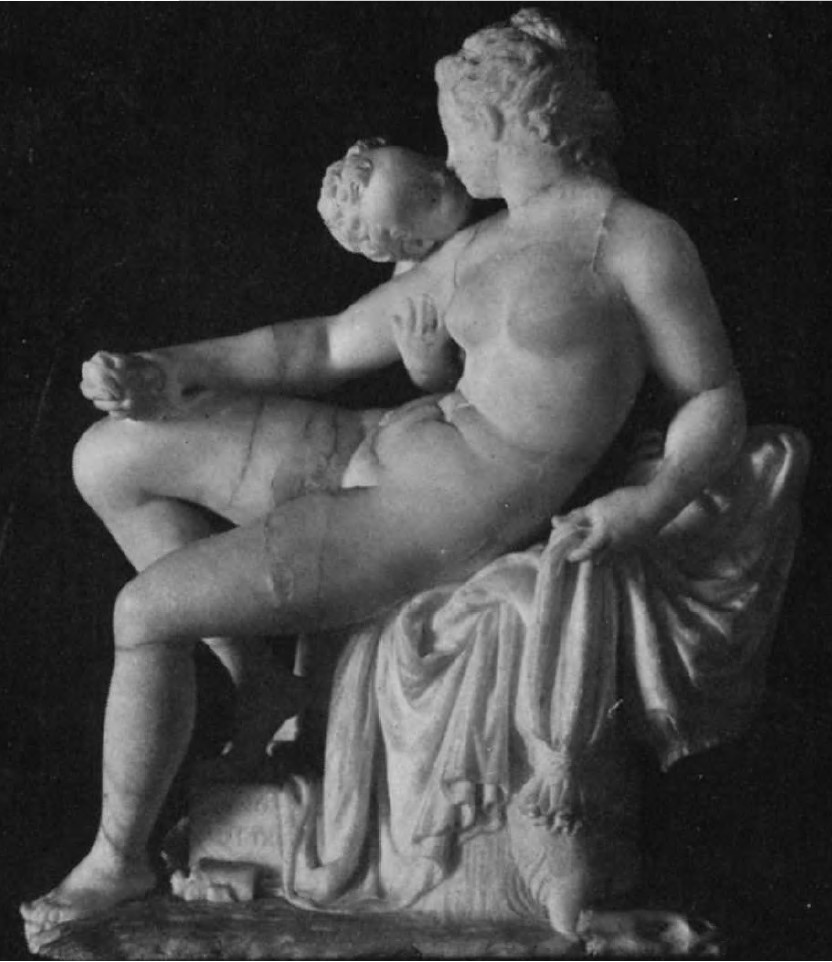
Cypris and Eros

The artist was prosperous and bought in 1567 a plot of land on the Korte Vaartstraat in central Antwerp on which he built a house named De liefde ('Love'). A relief by his hand referred to as The Garden of Eden or Love (collection of the Royal Museums of Fine Arts of Belgium, Brussels) is believed to have been part of a chimney piece of his house called De Liefde ('Love'), built by the artist in Antwerp. Van den Broecke later bought the plot adjacent to his home on which he constructed another house.

He was married to Sibilla Rausmaer. There is no information about the date of the marriage or the background of his wife. The couple had five children of whom Rafael, probably born around 1560, became a well-known sculptor. Another son Elias trained under his uncle Pieter in Mechelen and became a member of the Guild of St Luke of Antwerp in 1596 as a house painter.

The names of the pupils of Willem van den Broecke have not been recorded, but it is known he operated a large workshop in which he employed a significant number of pupils, many of whom came from his home town Mechelen. His work found a following among workshops in Mechelen and Antwerp, which created reliefs borrowing iconographic motives from van den Broecke. He operated his workshop as a skilled businessman, reproducing designs that were selling well, supplying other workshops with 'prefabricates' and selling finished works from his house De Liefde.

Van den Broecke died in Antwerp.

== Work ==
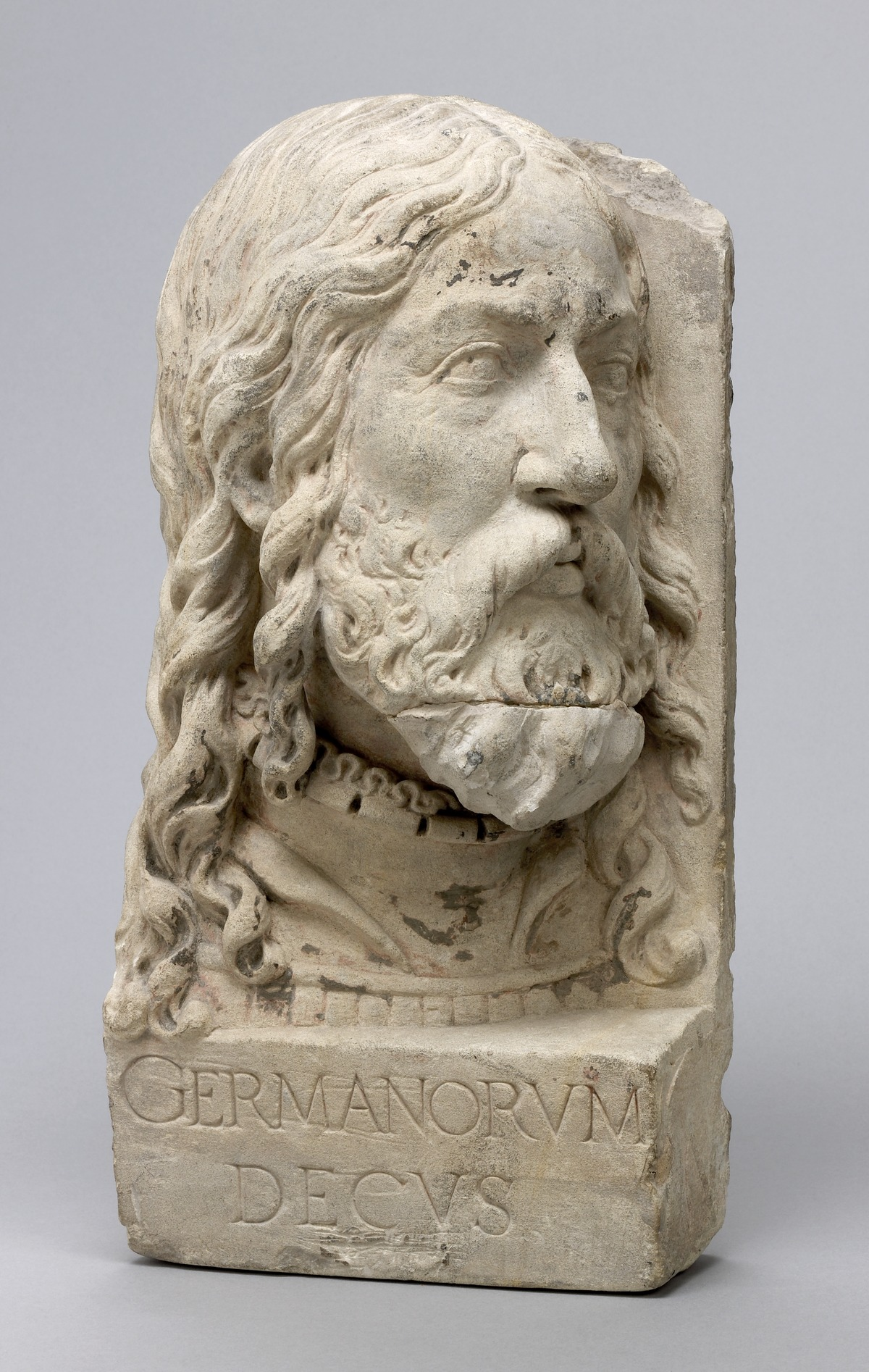
Portrait of Albrecht Dürer

Willem van den Broecke was a prolific artist who was active as a sculptor, painter, draughtsman and architect. Van den Broecke was a varied sculptor who worked in many materials including alabaster, marble, sandstone, wax and terracotta. His subject matter ranged from religious to mythological representations and portraits. He created large-scale works such as retables, partitions and fireplaces. He was particularly known in Antwerp for his small images, jewelry for cabinets of curiosities and the sculpted decorations of facades.

Van den Broecke's surviving works in his home country are relatively few. There are busts of Jan van Eyck and Albrecht Dürer that he made for the portal of Jan Adriaenssen's house in the Lange Nieuwstraat in Antwerp (now in the collection of the Museum aan de Stroom, Antwerp). He is further known as one of the designers of the Antwerp City Hall. The majority of his output was produced for the export market such as various religious reliefs that were made for Augsburg, Schwerin and Lübeck. His most important lost work was exported to the monastery church in Alba de Tormes in Spain.

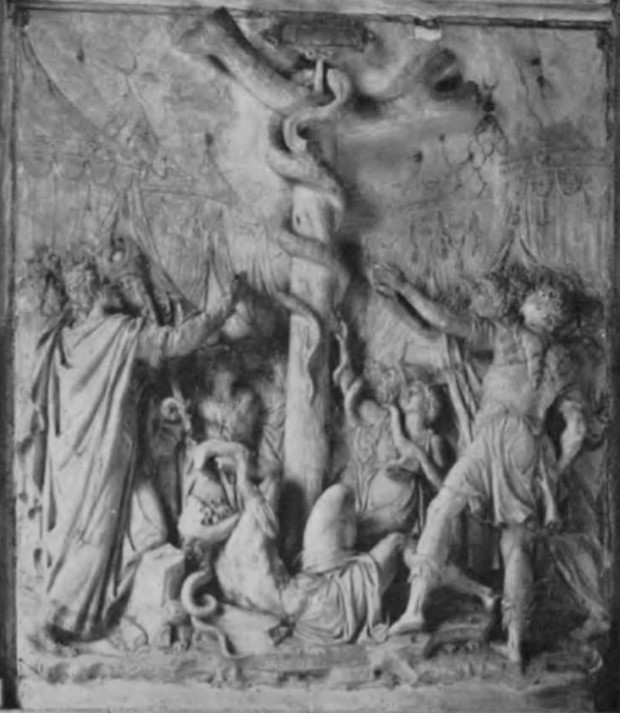
The Elevation of the Brazen Serpent

He was particularly known for his small-scale works, often executed in alabaster for which his native town Mechelen was famous. His earliest known work is the Cypris and Eros (1561, private collection). This small-scale marble statue was made not long after his return from Italy and shows the influence of Michelangelo's allegorical statues on tombs in Florence as well as Titian's Danaë. At the same time the nude figure prefigures the voluptuous beauties of the Flemish painters Rubens and Jordaens. Ten years later van den Broecke made the terracotta Anatomical study (Kunsthistorisches Museum), an écorché of a standing man. He is leaning against a tree trunk from which hangs the man's skin. In his right hand he holds the instrument with which he was skinned, a knife without a blade. In his left hand he holds part of his skin. The figure represents possibly Saint Bartholomew. An écorché such as this work was unprecedented in Flemish sculpture of the 16th century. A similar figure executed in bronze has been attributed to van den Broecke (Christie's New York auction of 29 January 2014).

Alabaster was one of his favorite materials in which he executed small-scale statuettes as well as larger religious reliefs. Characteristic of these reliefs is that the three-dimensional figures in the foreground are almost completely set off from the pronounced bas-relief of the background. His relief technique was likely gained mostly from his contact with the work of Andrea Sansovino and his pupil Jacopo Sansovino. In his reliefs he quoted antique and Italian motifs he would have seen in Italy. In his view of Jerusalem in the background of the Crucifixion of 1562 (Maximilian Museum in Augsburg) he depicted buildings of a specific city, Florence.

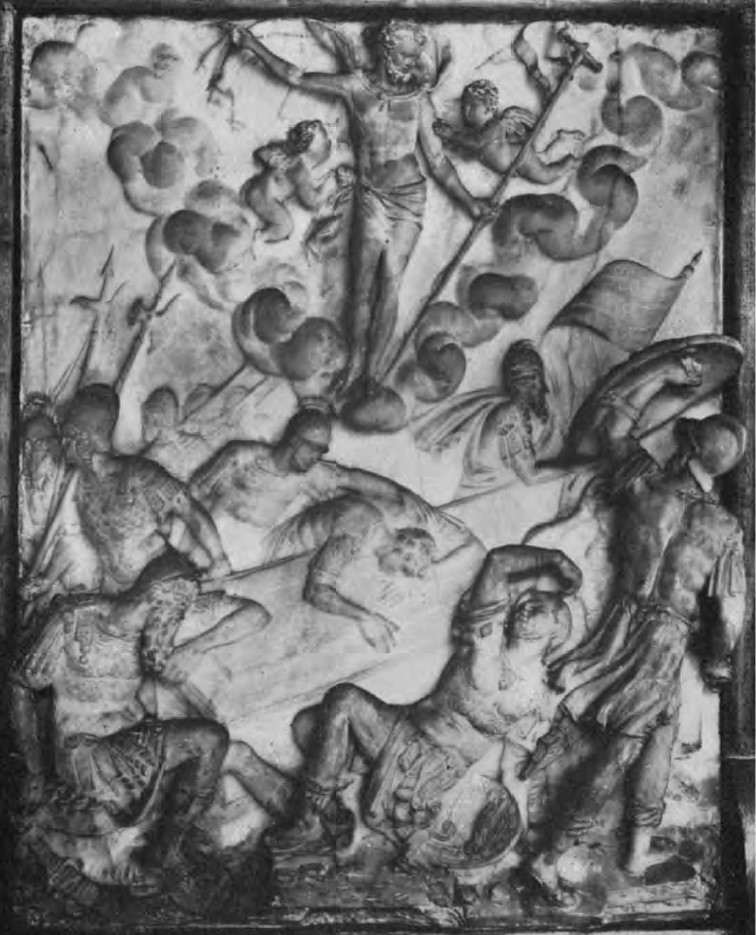
The Resurrection of Christ

He made various reliefs of Calvaries (depictions of the Crucifixion of Christ) in alabaster. These were likely destined for private devotion in residential homes (Maximilian Museum, Augsburg and Louvre Museum, Paris). His oldest alabaster relief is the Crucifixion of Christ, dated 1560 (Maximilian Museum in Augsburg). It was part of a retable of van den Broecke that was originally commissioned in 1560 by Bartholomeus May and his wife Sibilla Rembold for the Dominican church in Augsburg. The other parts of the retable include the Last Supper, the Sacrifice of Abraham, the Sacrifice of Melchizedek and the Resurrection of Christ (all in the Maximilian Museum in Augsburg). The Maximilian Museum holds another alabaster relief of the Crucifixion of Christ, signed and dated 1562, which was likely made for a private residence. It has its counterpart in a Crucifixion in the Louvre.

Van den Broecke made a second set of reliefs for the German market. This set was made for the chapel of the Schwerin Palace that was rebuilt by John Albert I, Duke of Mecklenburg in the period from 1560 to 1563. Of the six reliefs only one, representing The Elevation of the Brazen Serpent, is signed by van den Broecke. On stylistic grounds four other reliefs in this group can be attributed to van den Broecke. However, the Adoration of the Shepherds is certainly not by his hand. A third series of seven alabaster reliefs made by Willem van den Broecke in the period 1568 to 1572 decorates the pulpit of Lübeck Cathedral. The reliefs in this last series are closely based on the models for the Augsburg and Schwerin reliefs.

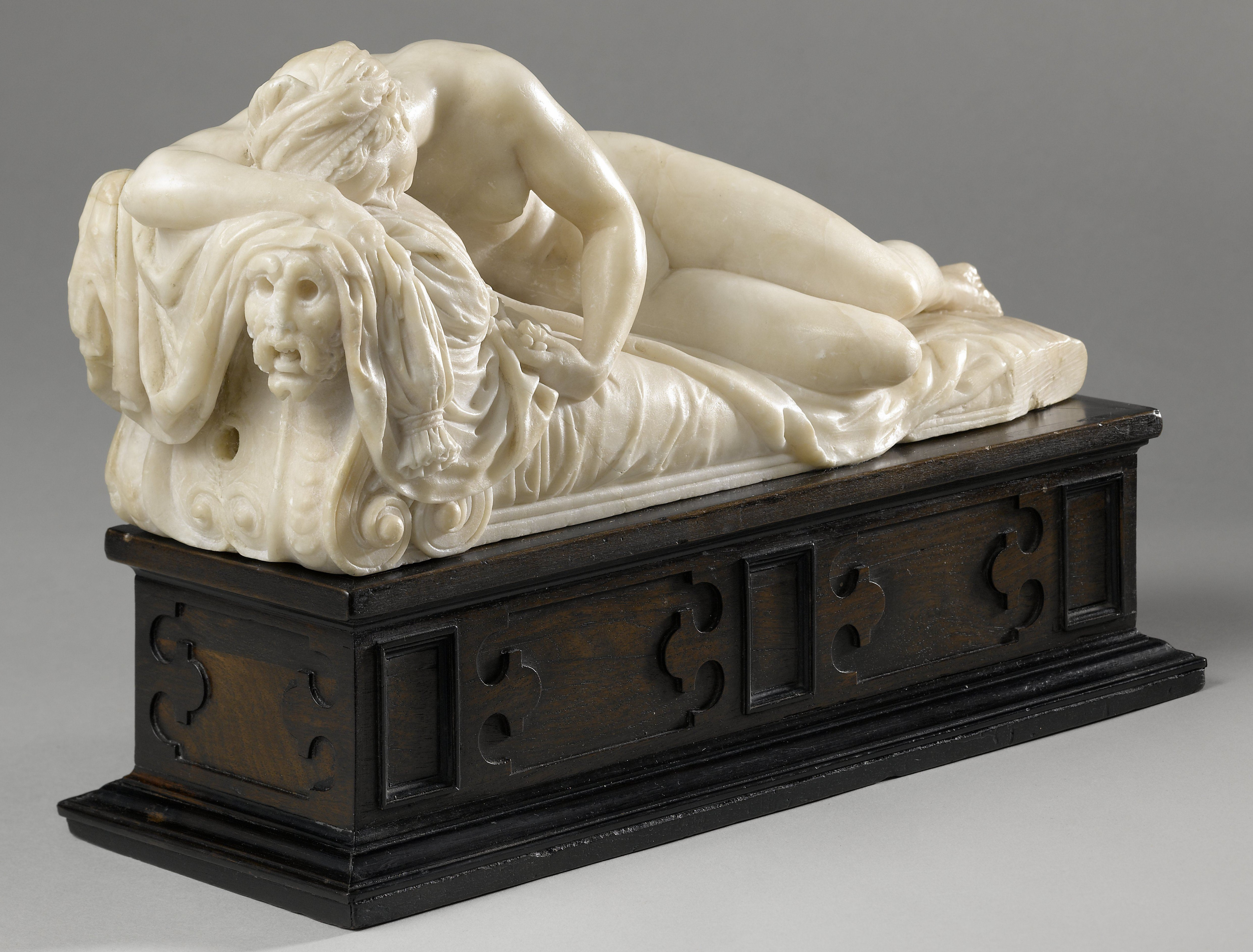
Sleeping nymph

He also created a number of small statuettes for a discerning clientele that appreciated stylish compositions and a detailed execution in precious material. These works are characterized by their remarkable quality of execution, as the alabaster allows to precisely give form to the expressions of the faces, the folds of the clothes and the details of the accessories. These works show the influence of Michelangelo as well as that of Giambologna, whose work he may have seen in Italy. Examples of such sculptures are the Sleeping nymph (c. 1550–1560, Rijksmuseum) and the Hercules (at Daniel Katz Gallery).

It is recorded that the artists made portraits in wax but no works of this kind are currently attributed to him.
