= Chrispijn van den Broeck =

Flemish painter and designer (1523–c. 1591)

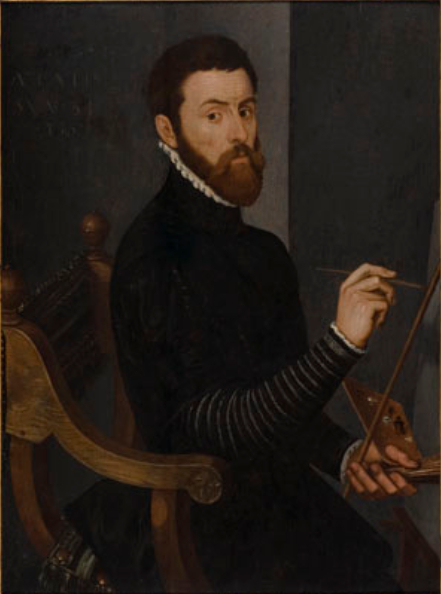
Self-portrait, 1557

Chrispijn van den Broeck (1523 – c. 1591) was a Flemish painter, draughtsman, print designer and designer of temporary decorations. He was a scion of a family of artists, which had its origins in Mechelen and later moved to Antwerp. He is known for his religious compositions and portraits as well as his extensive output of designs for prints. He was active in Antwerp which he left for some time because of the prosecution of persons adhering to his religious convictions.

== Life ==
Chrispijn van den Broeck was born in Mechelen as the son of Jan van den Broeck, a painter. His family members included artists who were active in Mechelen. His family also used the Latinised name 'Paludanus'. The Latinized name is based on the Latin translation ('palus') of the Dutch word 'broeck' which is part of the family name and means a marsh or swamp land. He was likely a relative of the sculptor and painter Willem van den Broecke and the painter Hendrick van den Broeck. He was probably trained by his father. He moved to Antwerp some time before 1555 since Chrispijn was registered as a master painter of the Guild of St. Luke of Antwerp for the first time in 1555.

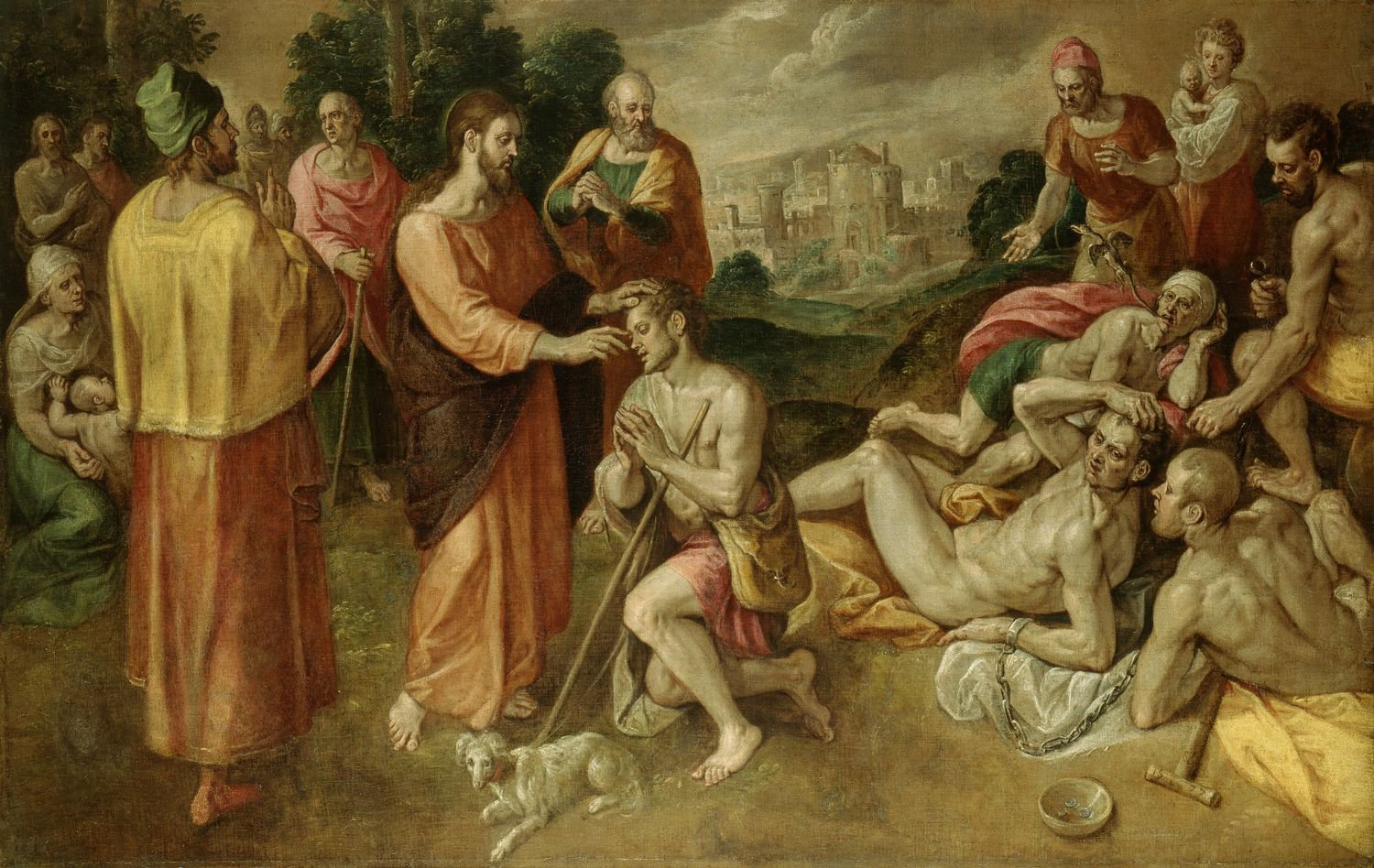
Christ healing the sick

Chrispijn was then working in the workshop of the leading history painter Frans Floris. Frans Floris was one of the Romanist painters active in Antwerp. The Romanists were Netherlandish artists who had trained in Italy and upon their return to their home countries painted in a style that assimilated Italian influences into the Northern painting tradition. Van den Broeck remained in Frans Floris' workshop until the master's death in 1570. He was together with Frans Pourbus the Elder one of the collaborators of Floris who helped finish Floris' paintings after the master had become incapacitated due to the alcoholism in which he had sunk in his later years. According to the Flemish contemporary art historian and artist Karel van Mander, Chrispijn van den Broeck and Frans Pourbus completed an altarpiece for the Grand Prior of Spain left incomplete at the time of Floris' death.

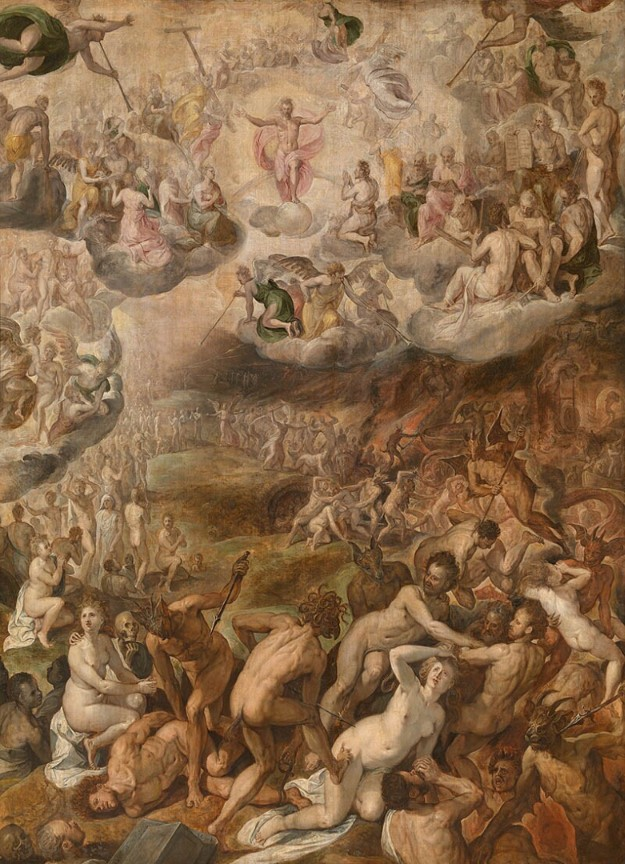
The last judgement

Van den Broeck became a citizen of Antwerp in 1559. He married Barbara de Bruyn. Their daughter Barbara van den Broeck (1560 -?) became an engraver who mainly created reproductions after her father's work. Crispijn may have lived in Italy for some time, but there is no evidence of this.

He received a pupil named Niclaes Ficet in his Antwerp workshop in 1577.

In 1584, van de Broeck resided in Middelburg for a short time to escape the political and religious unrest in Antwerp. His name was last mentioned in the Guild records of 1589 in connection with a payment. His wife is mentioned as a widow on 6 February 1591. Chrispijn van den Broeck must therefore have died sometime between 1589 and 6 February 1591, most likely in Antwerp.

== Work ==
Van Mander stated that Chrispijn van den Broeck was 'a good inventor... clever at large nudes and just as good an architect'. The latter may refer to his involvement in temporary constructions and decorations during festivities in the city, such as the theatre competition called the Landjuweel held in Antwerp in 1561 and the Joyous Entries in Antwerp of 1570 and 1582.

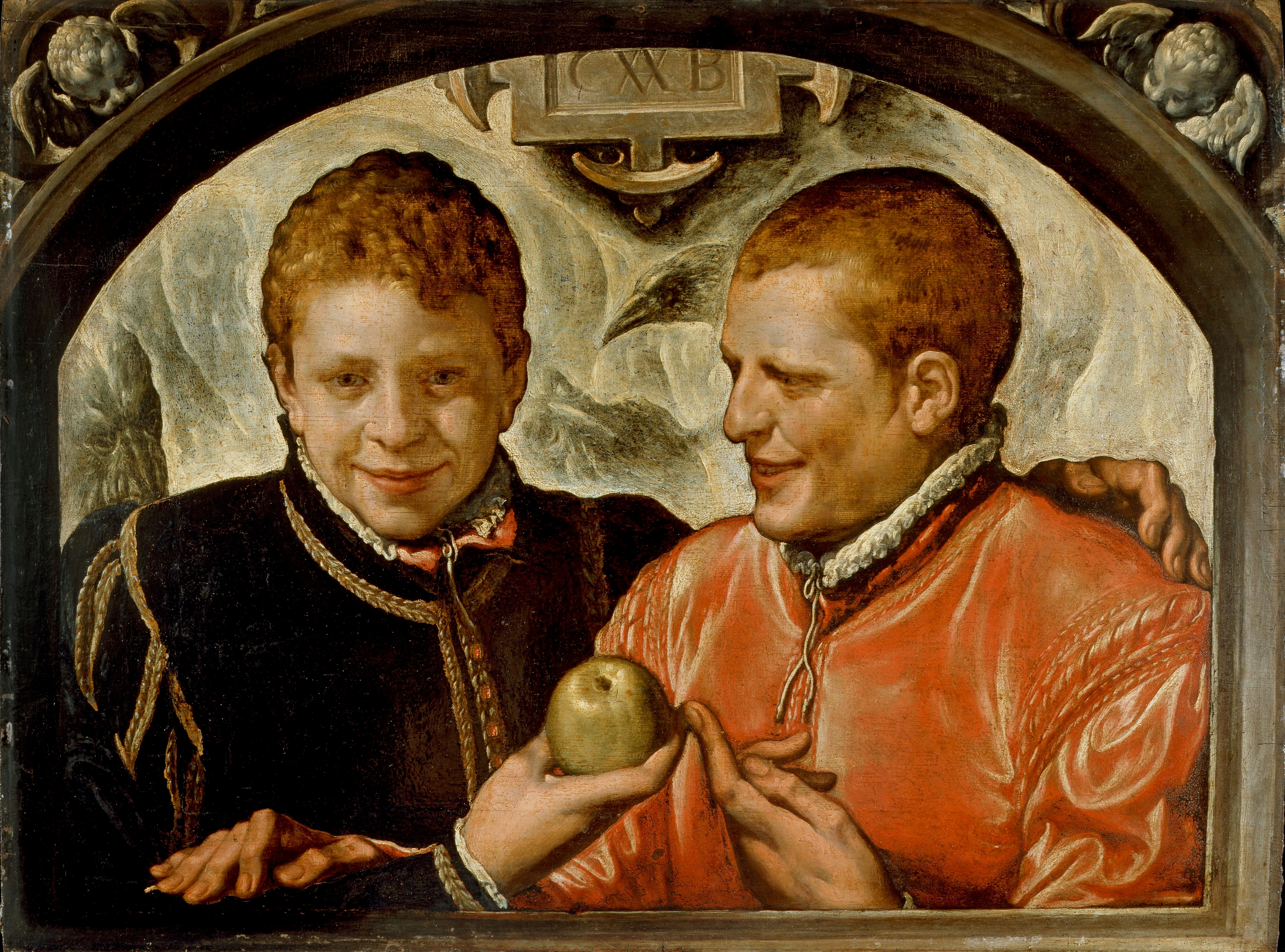
Two Young Men, Fitzwilliam Museum

About 23 paintings are attributed to Chrispijn van den Broeck, some of which are signed. From 16th and 17th century inventories in Antwerp van den Broeck's work is regularly mentioned, which indicates that his output must have been larger. While there is no evidence that the artist visited Italy, his work shows the influence of the Venetian Jacopo Bassano in the use of large, solid figures placed within a landscape. As he was a pupil of the Romanist Frans Floris who did study in Italy he may have received the Italian influence through his master. He may also have seen prints after Italian artworks. Van den Broeck further adopted Floris technique of applying a brown preparatory ground underneath the main colours of his paintings. As a result, his works typically display a brown hue. His palette favours pink, brown, grey and yellow tones.

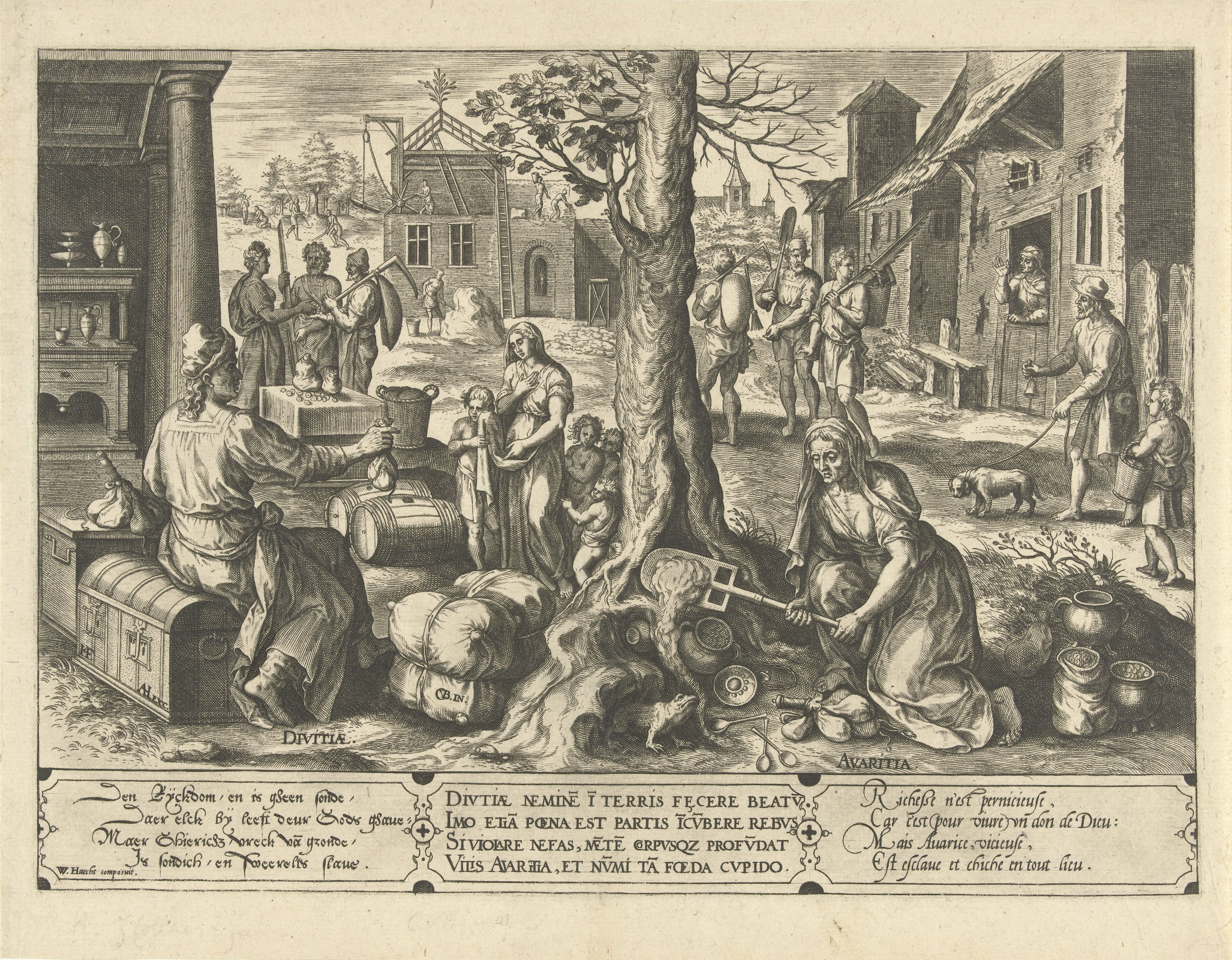
Avarice, the danger of wealth

Van den Broeck's painting Two Young Men (Fitzwilliam Museum) is a double portrait of two cheerful young men or adolescent boys. They are wearing fancy clothes in Italian fashion which were likely also worn by fashionable young men in 16th century Flanders. Their embrace and smiling glances show that the relationship between the two men is close. The boy in black seems to be offering his friend an apple while he looks at the viewer with a smile. The other boy looks with a smile at the boy in black. While an apple was often used as a symbol of physical love, it would be wrong to assume the painting depicts two homosexual lovers. The boys' physical likeness indicates that they are more likely brothers. Based on the symbols used throughout the painting, its subject appears to be death. Two dark owl heads peek out over each shoulder of the boy in black while a crow's or raven's head in profile with its sharp beak pointed towards the boy in black juts out from the right side of the head of the boy in red. Both the owl and the raven are traditional symbols of death. The stone panel at the top of the picture bears the artist's initials and recalls funerary sculpture.

A total of 146 drawings have been attributed with certainty to van den Broeck. Of these, 89 are designs for engravings. His earliest drawing is dated 1560. It is possible that his tendency to accentuate the contours of forms made his drawings suited as designs for prints. Whether Van den Broeck himself also etched or engraved is unknown. From 1566 onwards van den Broeck started to create design drawings for publications by Christoffel Plantin, such as for Benito Arias Montano's Humanae salutis monumenta published in 1571. Van den Broeck also worked for print publishers Gerard de Jode, Adriaen Huybrechts, Hans van Luijck, Willem van Haecht the Elder and Plantin's successor Jan Moretus I.

His designs were engraved by engravers such as Abraham de Bruyn, Jan Collaert the Elder and Johannes Wierix. He designed the illustration of the allegory of the Low Countries used in Lodovico Guicciardini's Descrizione di tutti I Paesi Bassi (1567).
