= Maximilianmuseum =

Coordinates: 48.3678°N 10.8967°E

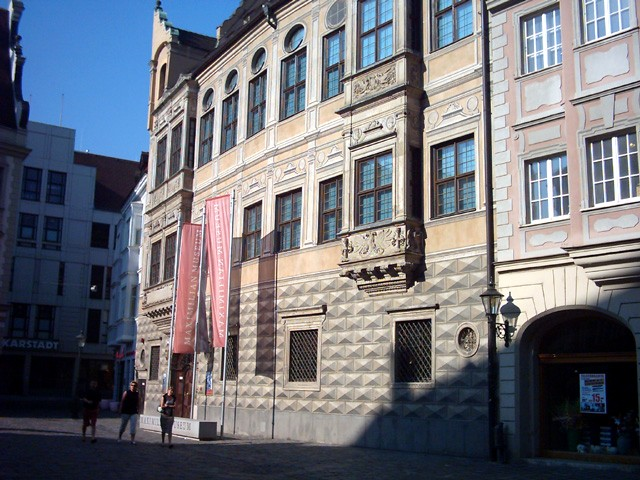
Facade of the Museum.

The Maximilian Museum is a large, public museum housed in a palatial building erected in 1546 in Augsburg, Germany. It houses a notable collection of decorative arts. Augsburg was the leading German center of sculpture, painting, and, especially, of fine work in gold in silver from the late Middle Ages until the modern period.

The museum was opened in 1855.
