= Matteino da Siena =

Italian painter (1533–1588)

Matteo da Siena (or Matteino) (1533 in Siena – 1588 in Rome) was an Italian painter of landscapes and buildings. He was especially noted for his frescoes in the Vatican, including the Galleria Geographical and Sala Ducale, and the Gregorian Tower (Tower of the Winds). His frescoes in the tower are known as the "Allegories of the Seasons".
