= Haus von Orley =

Coordinates: 50°11′43″N 6°08′11″E

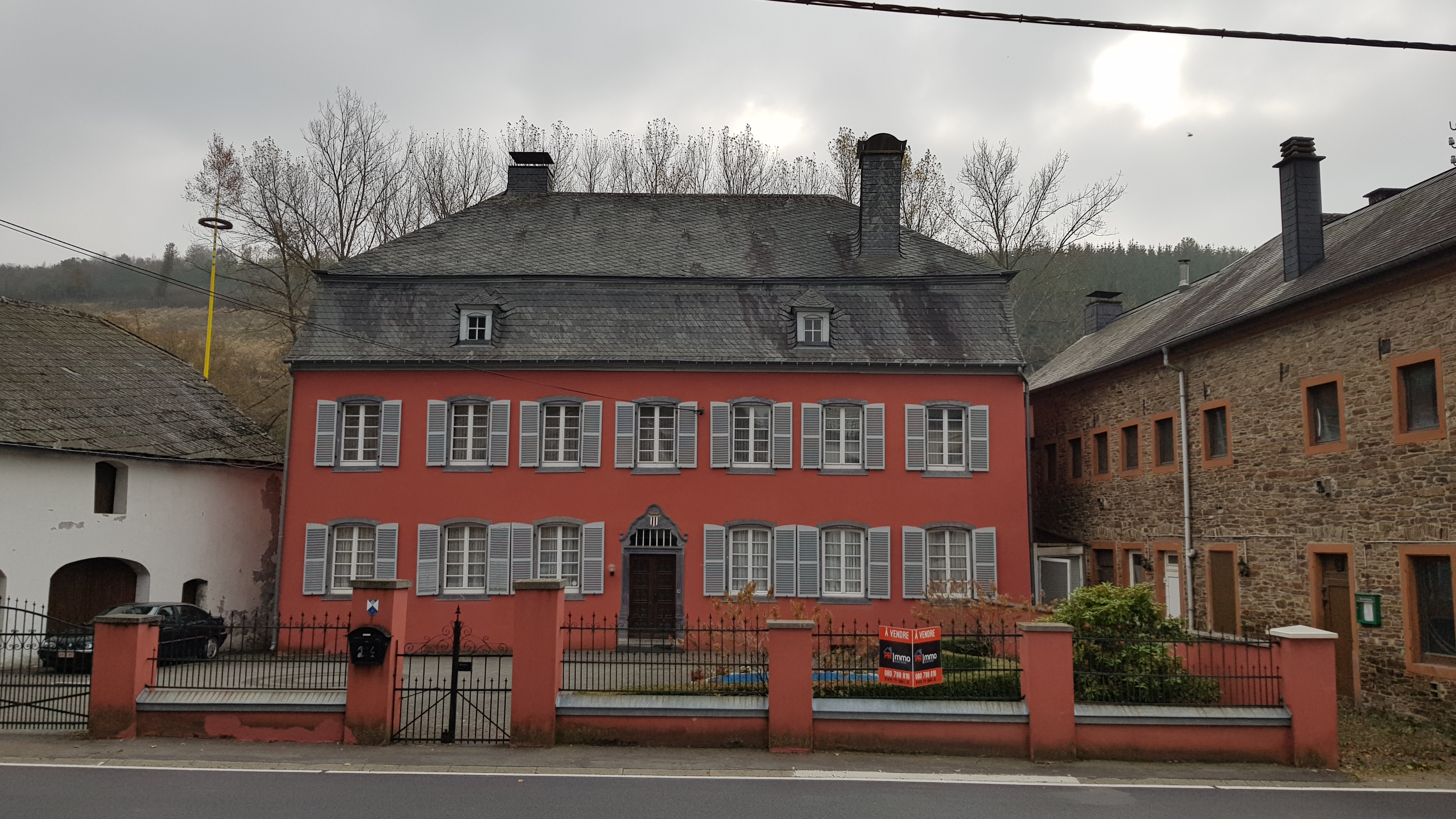
Haus von Orley (1747)

Haus von Orley in Burg Reuland is a baroque mansion built for the Von Orley family from Luxembourg in 1747, as is evidenced by the Von Orley coat of arms and the date of above the entrance door. The house has a broad, symmetrical rendered facade of natural stone. All window and door surrounds are in blue stone. The baroque door frame with the skylight is highly decorated. The vaulted cellars of the building, the inglenook in the kitchen, the fireplace mantles and the panelling possibly originate from a prior dwelling on the same site.

The Von Orley family was a noble family from Luxembourg which is listed in the 1882 Annuaire de la Noblesse de Belgique. According to that record, Jean-Jacques Orley de Linster, seigneur de Falkenstein, born in 1672 died at his residence in Reuland in 1747, the year that Haus Von Orley was completed. His wife Marie-Anne von Stein has predeceased him in 1743. They were succeeded by their first-born son Jean Maurice II Orley de Linster, seigneur de Falkenstein who lived in Burg Reuland until his death on 22 April 1774. His only daughter Marie-Angélique Orley de Linster married Jean-Georges de Pfortzheim, Seigneur de Colpach et Koerich, son of Philippe and Catharine de Neuheuser. Marie-Angélique died without issue in 1794.

Marie-Angélique's epitaph can be found in the Sankt Hubertus Chapel in Weweler. Jean-Georges went on to serve as Mayor of the City of Luxembourg.

For many years the house served as the Burg Reuland doctor's surgery and pharmacy and was known locally as "die Apotheke". The interior of Haus Von Orley still contains the original surgery and pharmacy.
