= Bracht =

Bracht may refer to:

- Bracht (surname)
- Bracht (river), of Hesse, Germany
- a division of the town Brüggen, Germany
- a division of the town Gummersbach, Germany
- a division of the town Rauschenberg, Hesse, Germany
- a division of the town Burg-Reuland, Belgium
- Bracht (Schmallenberg), a division of the town Schmallenberg, Germany
- Bracht–Wachter bodies, yellow-white spots in the myocardium, a finding in endocarditis
