= Hendrick Goltzius =

Dutch Golden Age painter (1573–1649)

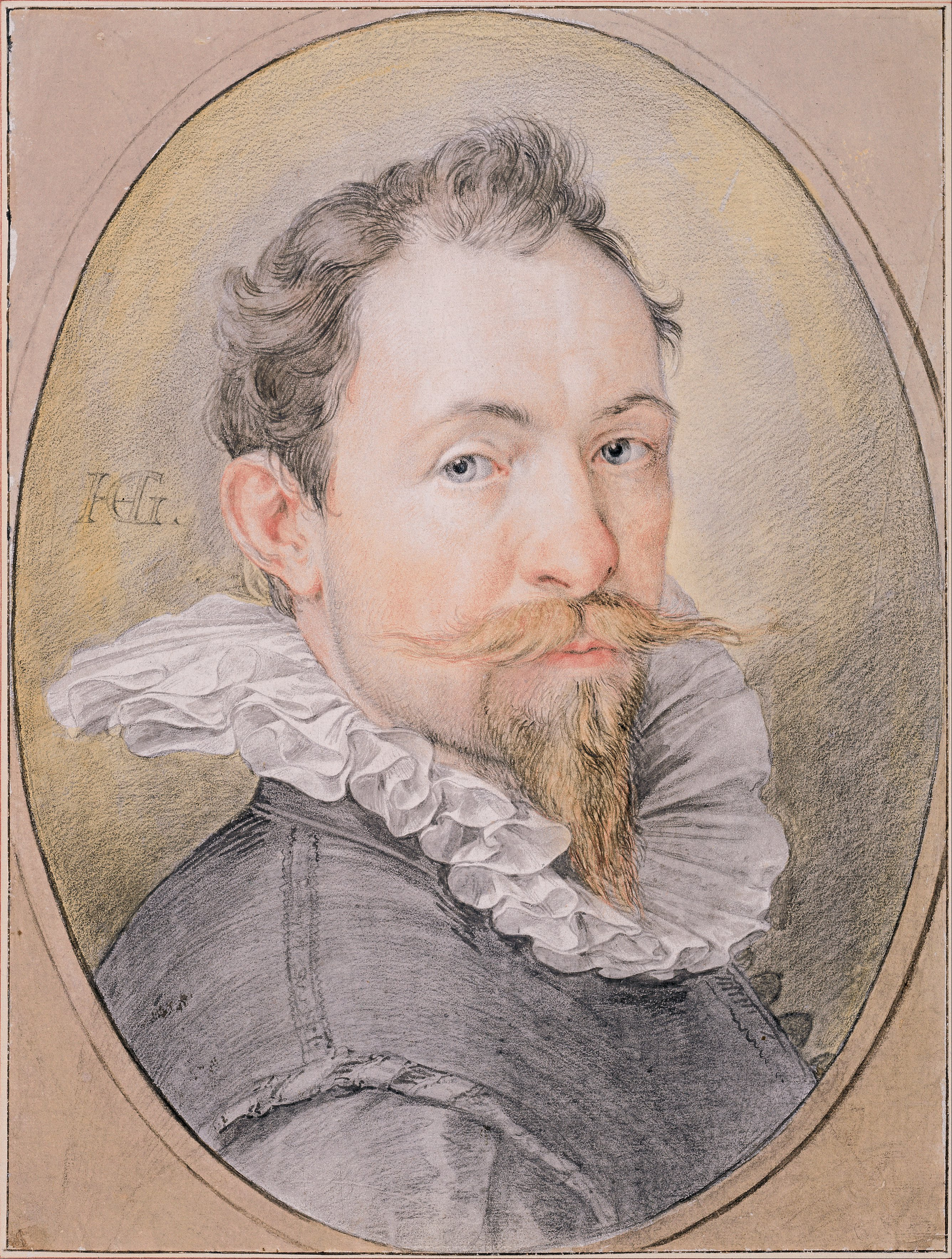
- Self-portrait (c. 1593–94)
- Born: Hendrick Goltz; January/February 1558; Bracht, Duchy of Jülich, Holy Roman Empire
- Died: 1 January 1617 (aged 58–59); Haarlem, Dutch Republic
- Occupations: Printmaker, draftsman, painter
- Known for: Use of the burin tool for engraving
- Style: Northern Mannerism

Hendrick (Note: Also spelt as Hendrik.) Goltzius (German: [ˈhɛndʁɪk ˈɡɔltsi̯ʊs], Dutch: [ˈɦɛndrɪk ˈxɔltsijʏs]; né Goltz; January or February 1558 – 1 January 1617) was a German-born Dutch printmaker, draftsman, and painter. He has been described as the leading Dutch engraver of the early Baroque period, or Northern Mannerism, lauded for his sophisticated technique, technical mastership and "exuberance" of his compositions. According to A. Hyatt Mayor, Goltzius "was the last professional engraver who drew with the authority of a good painter and the last who invented many pictures for others to copy". In the middle of his life he also began to produce paintings.

== Early life ==
Goltzius was born near Viersen in Bracht or Millebrecht, a village then in the Duchy of Julich, now in the municipality Brüggen in North Rhine-Westphalia. His father, Jan Goltz, was a glass painter, and Goltzius received his earliest artistic training in his father's workshop.

His family moved to Duisburg when he was three years old. Duisburg was an active commercial town on the lower Rhine, and the move placed the young Goltzius in a region closely connected to the artistic and intellectual networks of the German–Dutch borderlands.

After studying painting on glass for some years under his father, he learned engraving from the Dutch polymath Dirck Volckertszoon Coornhert, who then lived in Cleves.

Under Coornhert’s guidance Goltzius developed the technical foundations of printmaking and became familiar with the humanist artistic culture that connected artists, printers, and scholars across the Netherlands and the Rhineland.

== Career ==
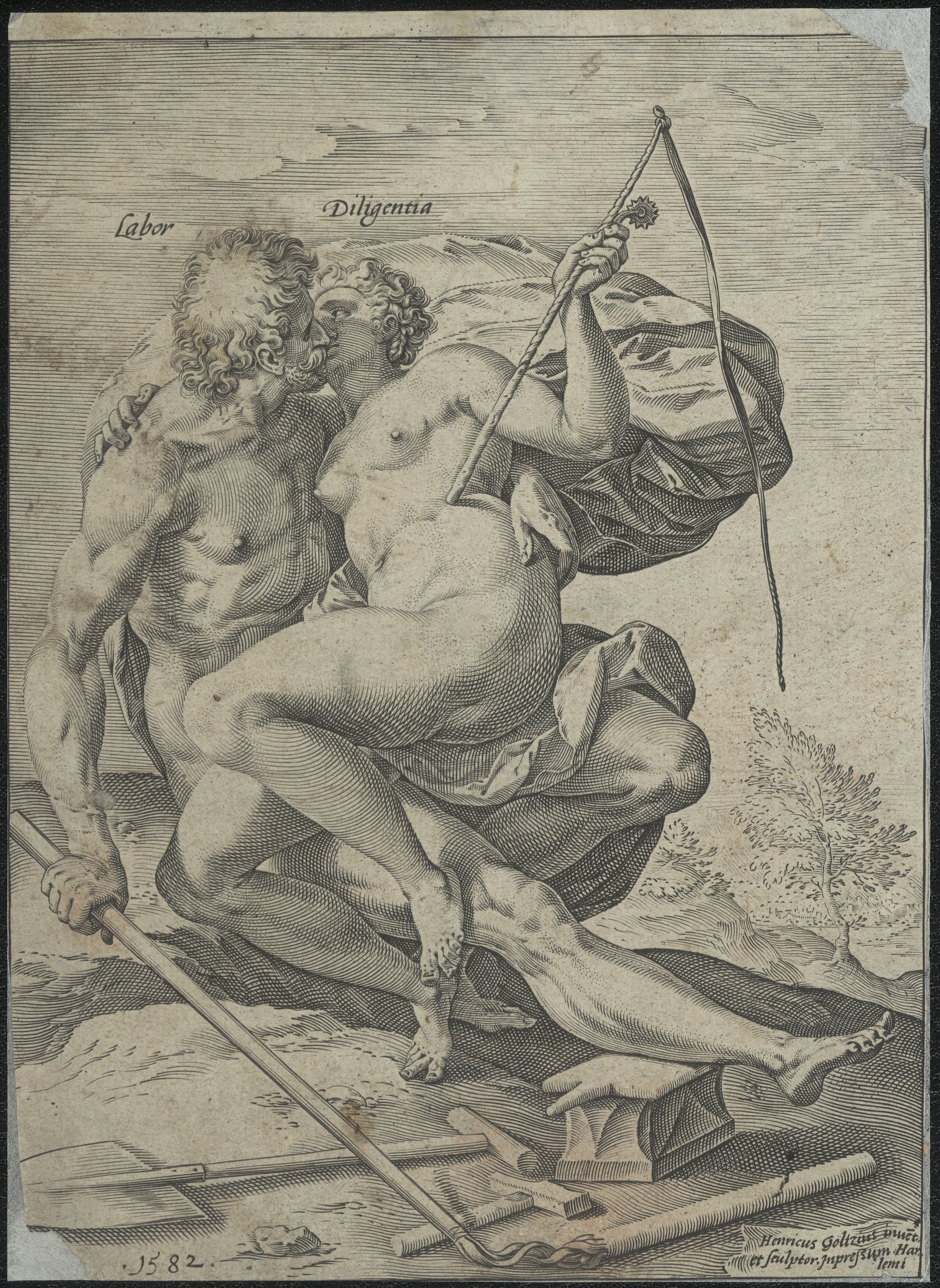
Print reflecting an allegorical representation of work and diligence.

In 1577, at about the age of nineteen, Goltzius moved with Dirck Volckertszoon Coornhert to Haarlem in the Dutch Republic, where he remained based for the rest of his life. In the same town he was employed by the publisher Philip Galle to engrave a series of prints illustrating the story of Lucretia.

During the 1580s Goltzius worked with Karel van Mander and Cornelis van Haarlem. Together they established an informal drawing academy in Haarlem where artists studied the human figure from life.

In 1590 Goltzius travelled through Germany to Italy, where he studied the works of Michelangelo and other Italian masters. He returned to Haarlem in 1591 and continued to work there for the rest of his life.

Around the age of forty-two he began to produce paintings in addition to engravings. Some of his paintings are now in Vienna.

He also executed a number of chiaroscuro woodcuts. His portraits, though mostly miniatures, are notable for their finish and characterization. His life-size self-portrait is among his most striking works.

=== Engraving ===
Goltzius has been described as the leading Dutch engraver of the early Baroque period, associated with Northern Mannerism, and was widely recognized for his technical mastery and the expressive quality of his line. His work has been described as combining technical control with an "exuberance" of composition.

According to A. Hyatt Mayor, an American curator and historian of prints, Goltzius "was the last professional engraver who drew with the authority of a good painter and the last who invented many pictures for others to copy".

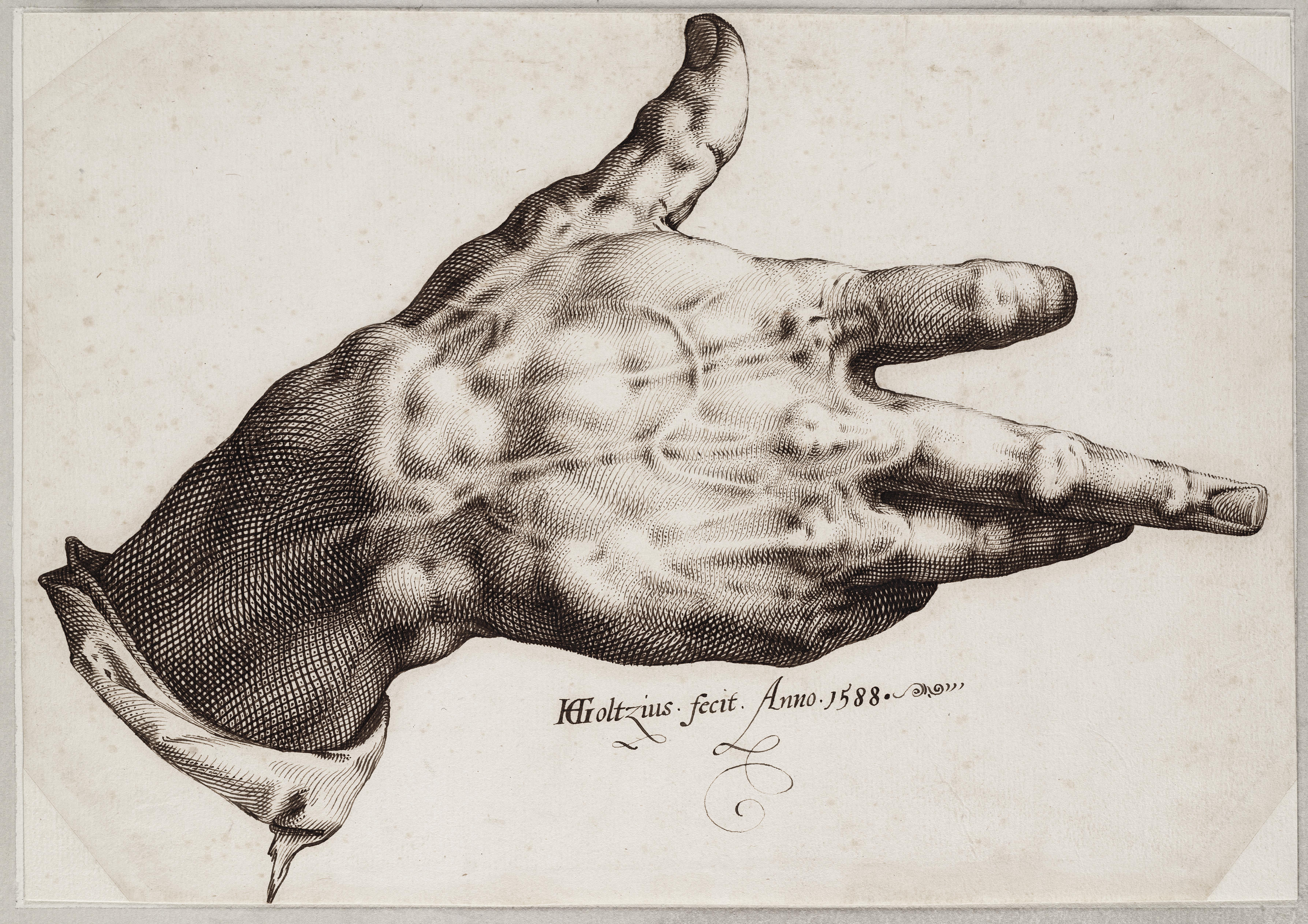
Goltzius's drawing of his right hand

His approach to engraving was shaped in part by a childhood injury. When he was still a child he fell into burning coals, an accident that left his right hand permanently deformed and unable to fully extend the fingers. This led him to draw and engrave using the larger muscles of his arm and shoulder, contributing to what has been described as a "commanding swing of the line".

He developed a highly refined technique in the use of the burin, bringing to a high level what has been described as the "swelling line", in which engraved lines vary in thickness to create tonal effects. He also employed a "dot and lozenge" method, placing dots within cross-hatched areas to refine shading.

According to the catalogue of German art historian and cataloguer of prints Friedrich Wilhelm Hollstein, 388 prints are attributed directly to Goltzius, with a further 574 produced by other printmakers after his designs. He engraved works after artists such as Bartholomeus Spranger, and in his command of the burin he has often been compared with Albrecht Dürer.

== Death ==
He died, aged 58, in Haarlem.

== Public collections ==
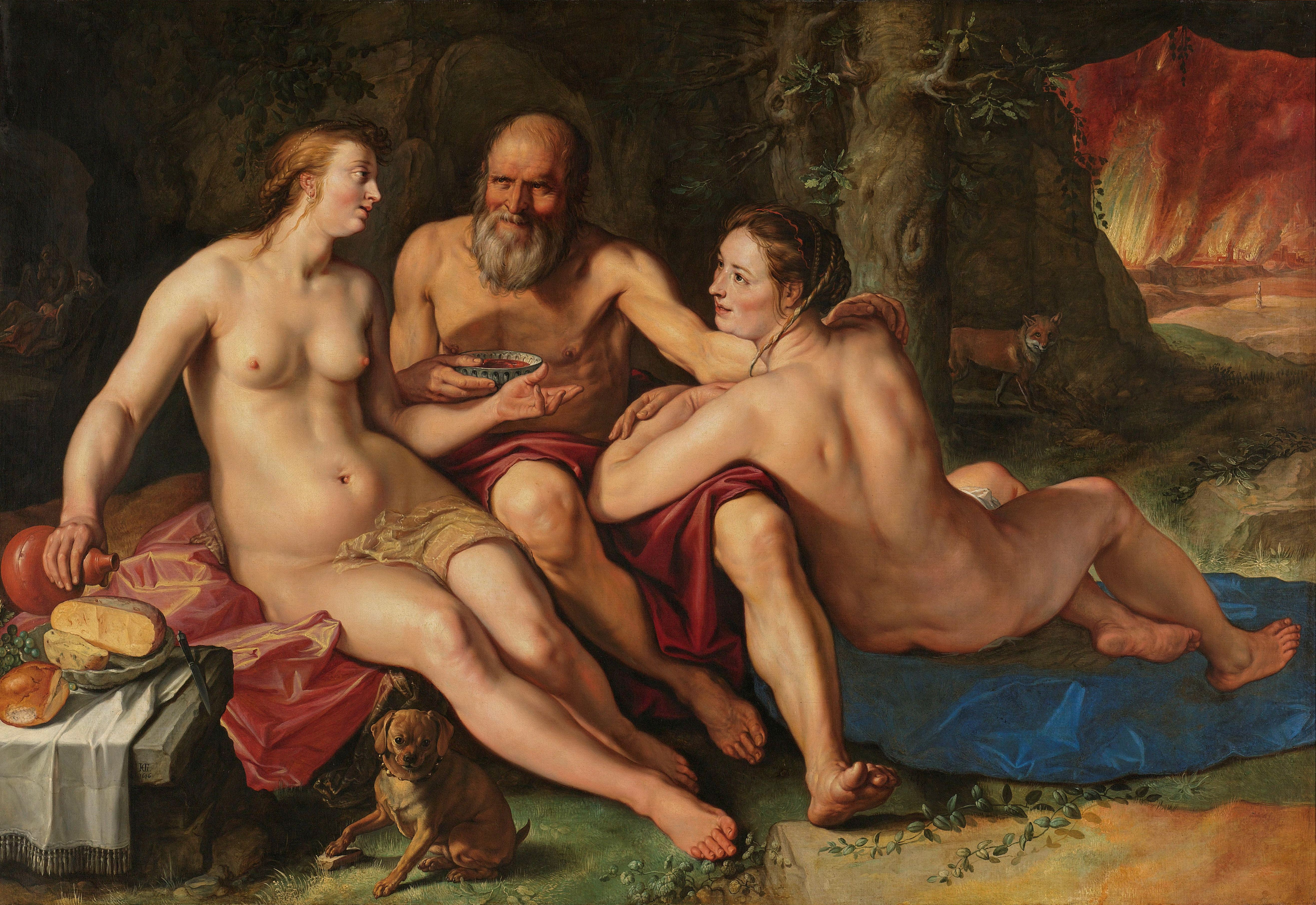
Lot and his Daughters (1616) in the collection of the Rijksmuseum.

Most major print rooms will have a group of Goltzius's many engravings.

- Museum Boijmans Van Beuningen, Rotterdam
- Rijksmuseum Amsterdam
- Blanton Museum of Art, Austin
- University of Michigan Museum of Art, Ann Arbor
- The Metropolitan Museum of Art, New York City
- Philadelphia Museum of Art
- British Museum, London
- Los Angeles County Museum of Art
- Fine Arts Museums of San Francisco

== Gallery ==
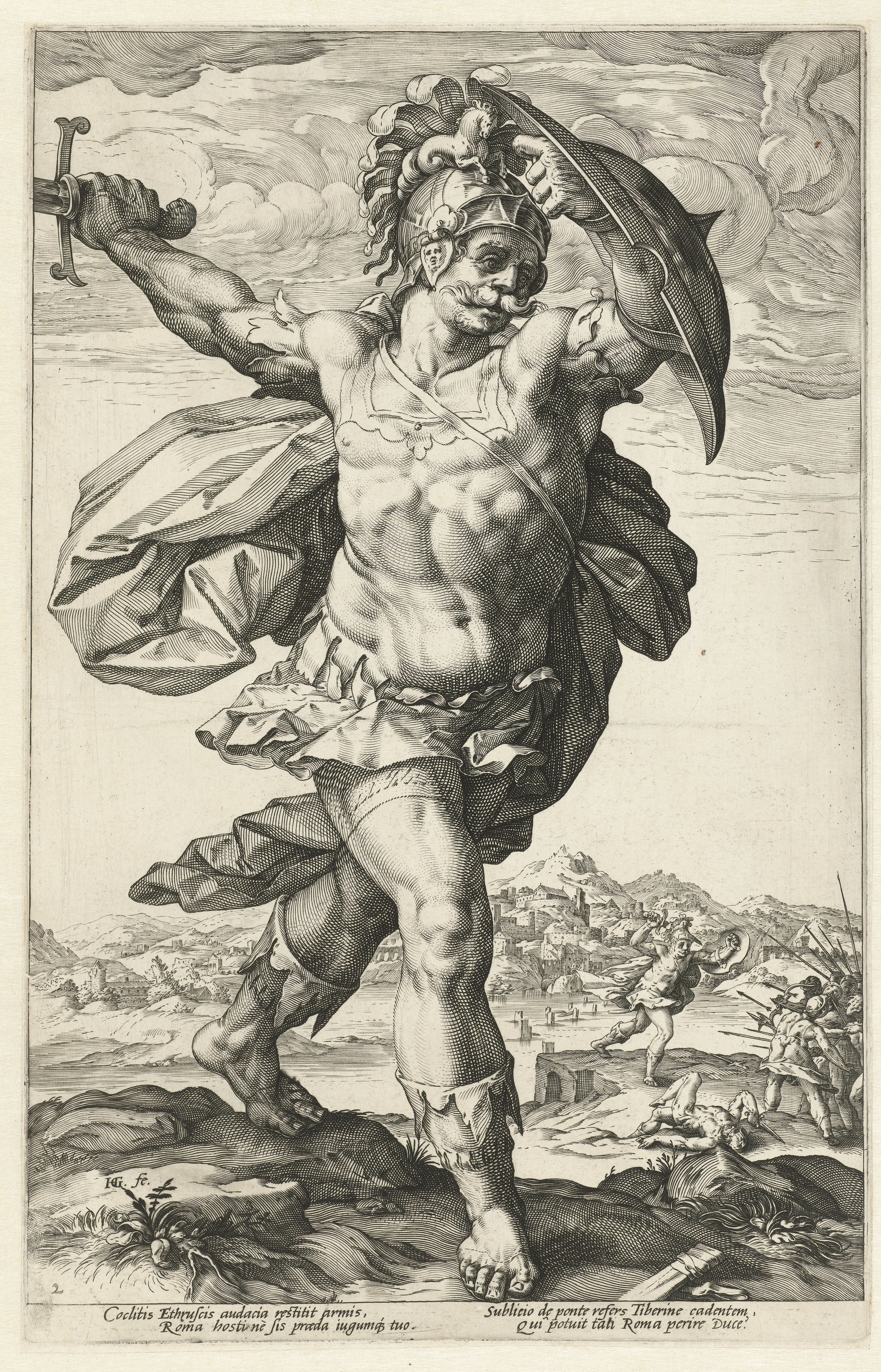
Horatius Cocles, from The Roman Heroes, 1586

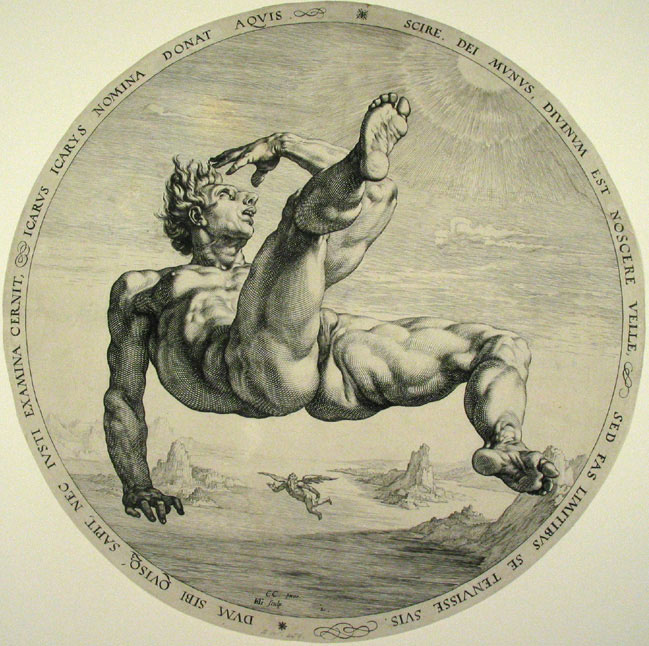
Icarus (1588) from the series The four disgracers

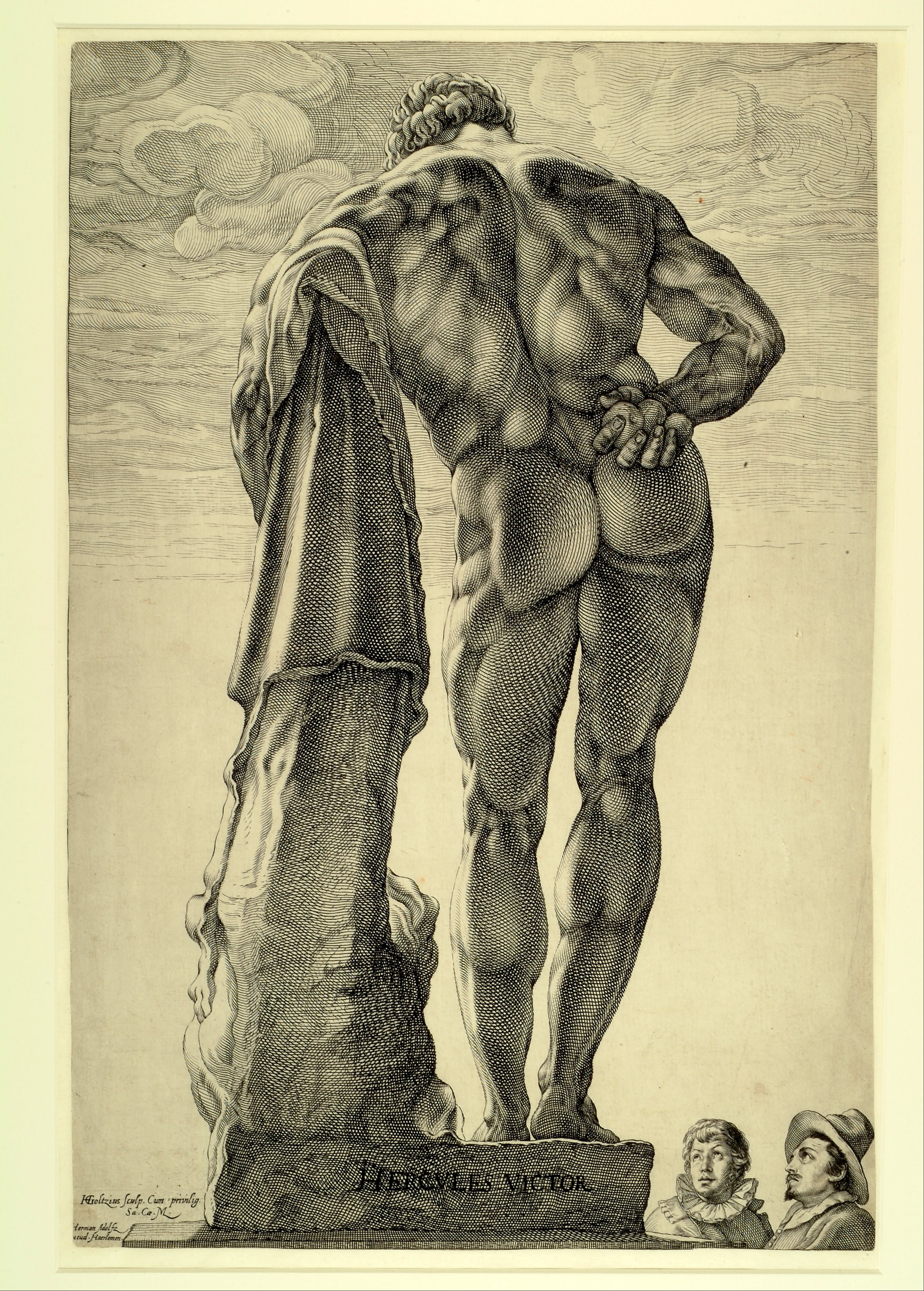
Engraving of the Farnese Hercules, c. 1598

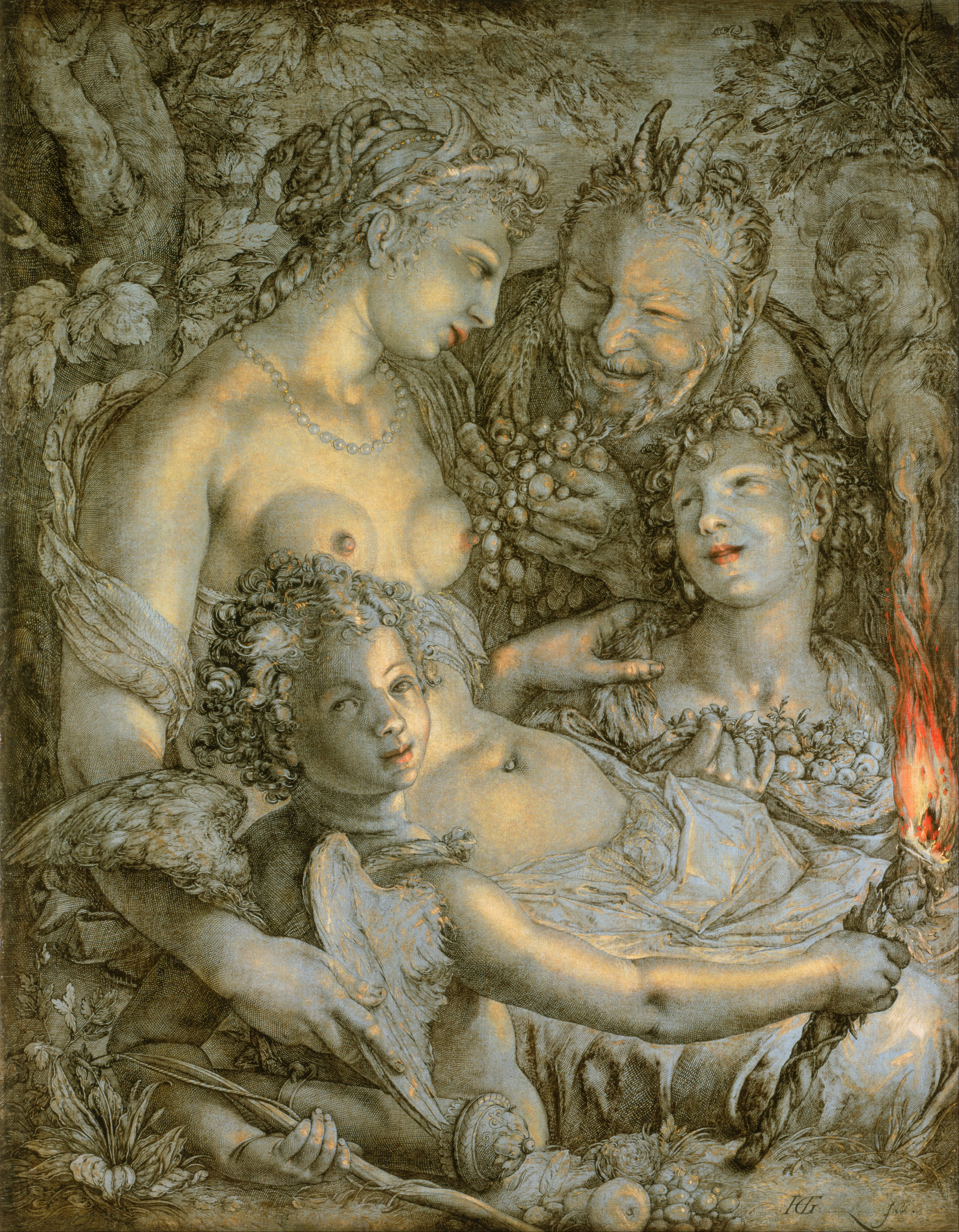
Sine Cerere et Baccho friget Venus ('Without Ceres and Bacchus, Venus Would Freeze'), 1600–03, Philadelphia Museum of Art

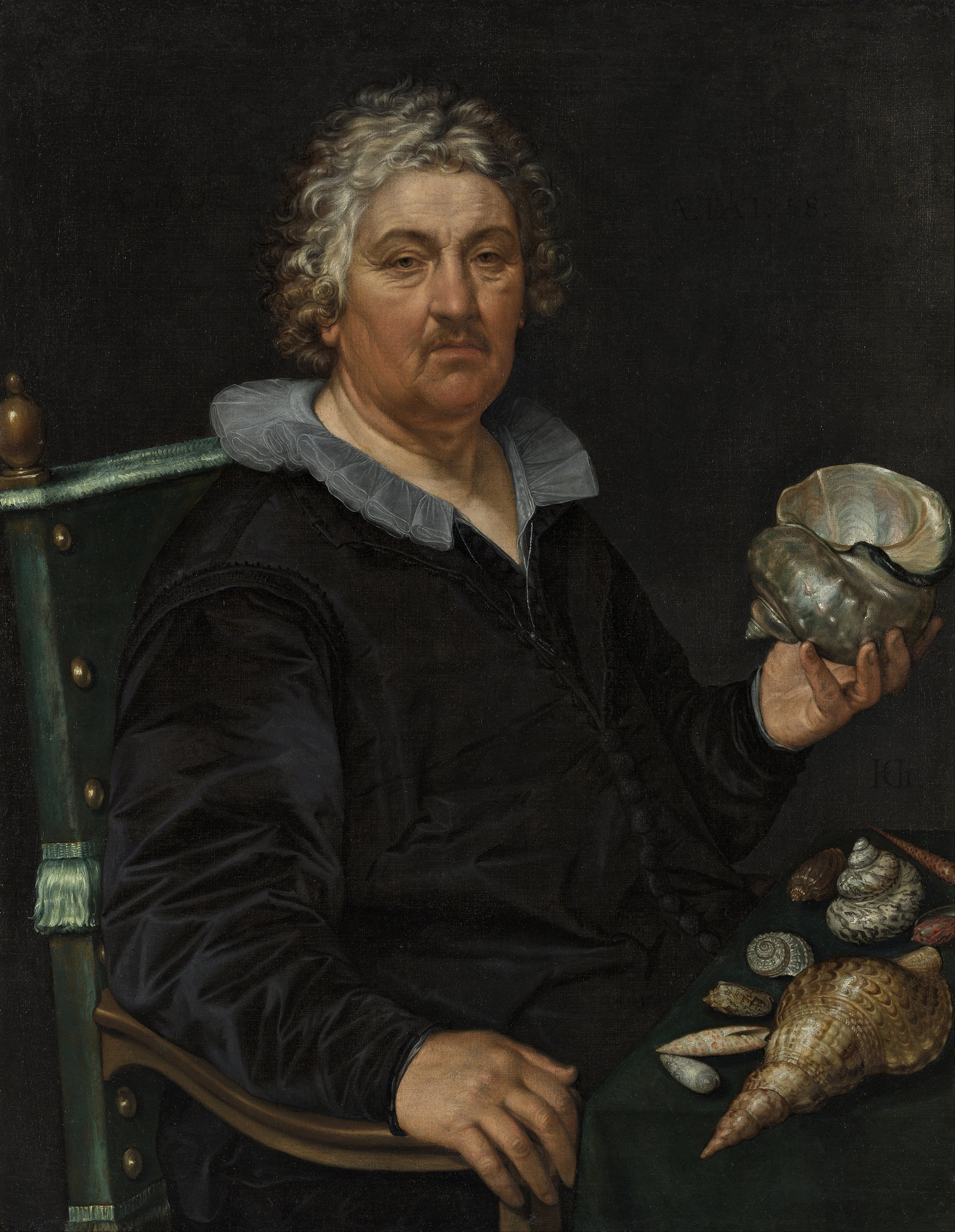
Portrait of the Shell Collector Jan Govertsen van der Aer, 1603, Museum Boijmans Van Beuningen

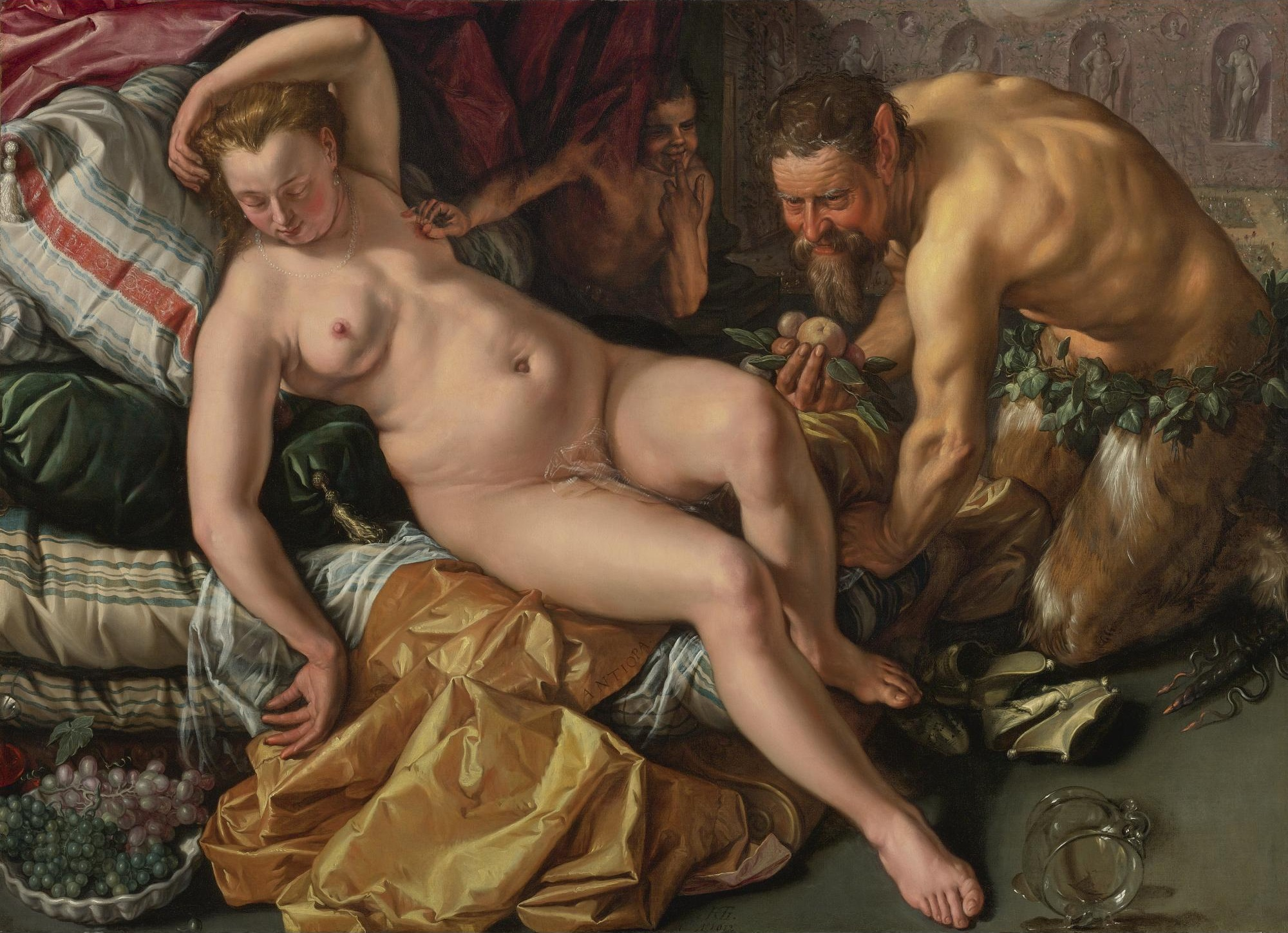
Jupiter and Antiope, 1612, National Gallery, London

The Fall of Man, 1616, National Gallery of Art, Washington, D.C.

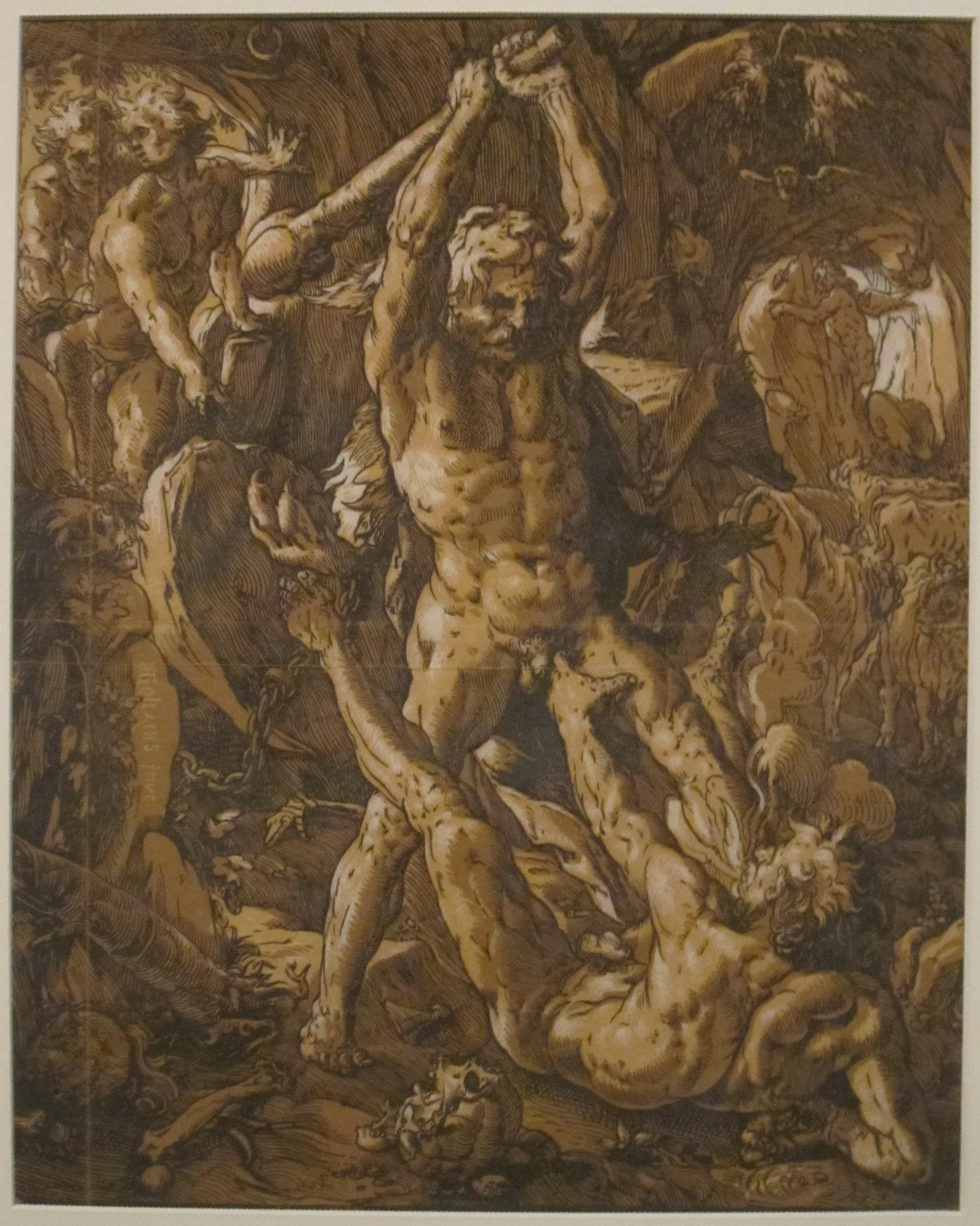
Hercules Killing Cacus, a chiaroscuro woodcut, 1588

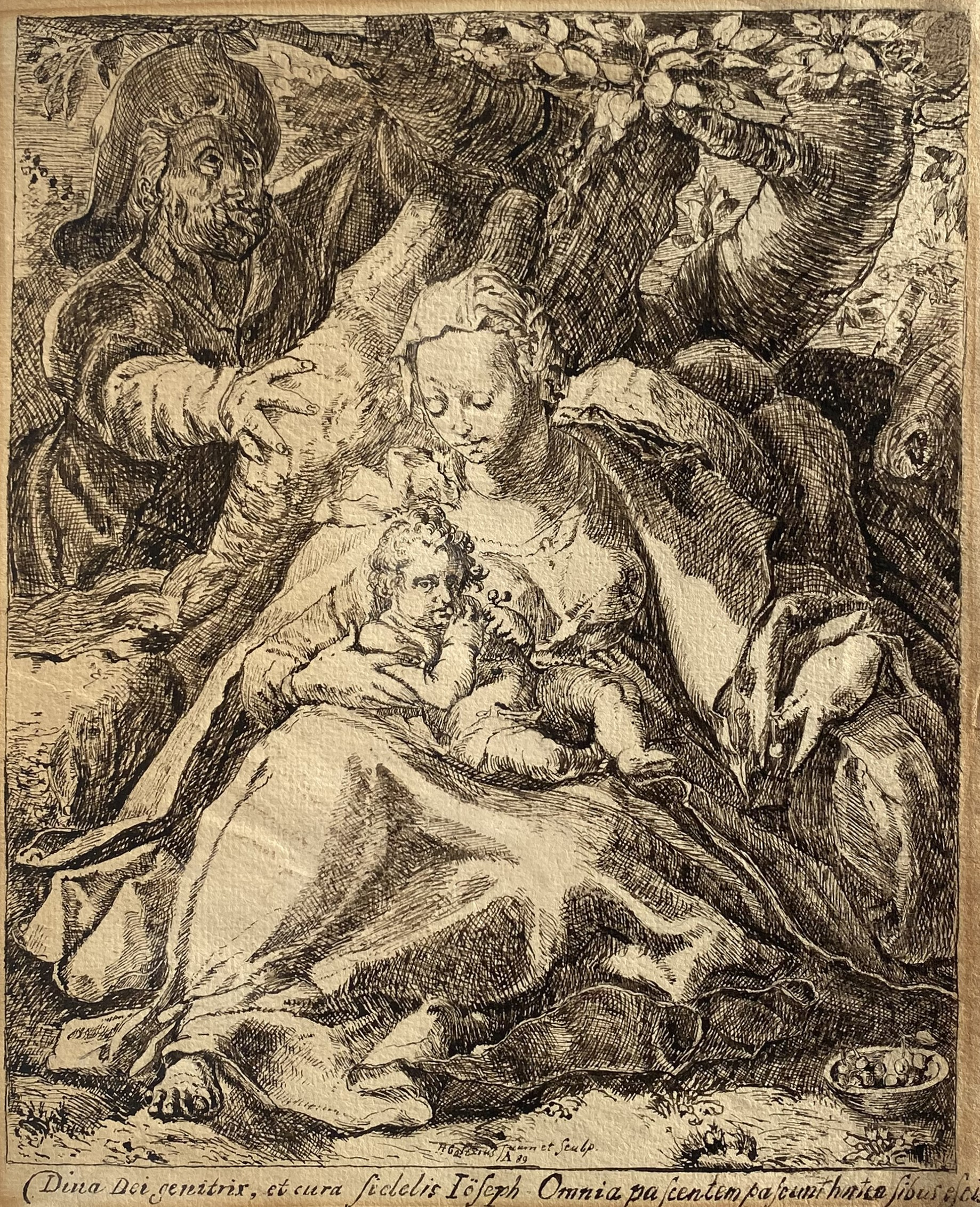
Divine Mother of God, and the faithful care of Joseph. All [things] feed who feeds all, 1589, pen and black ink on laid paper

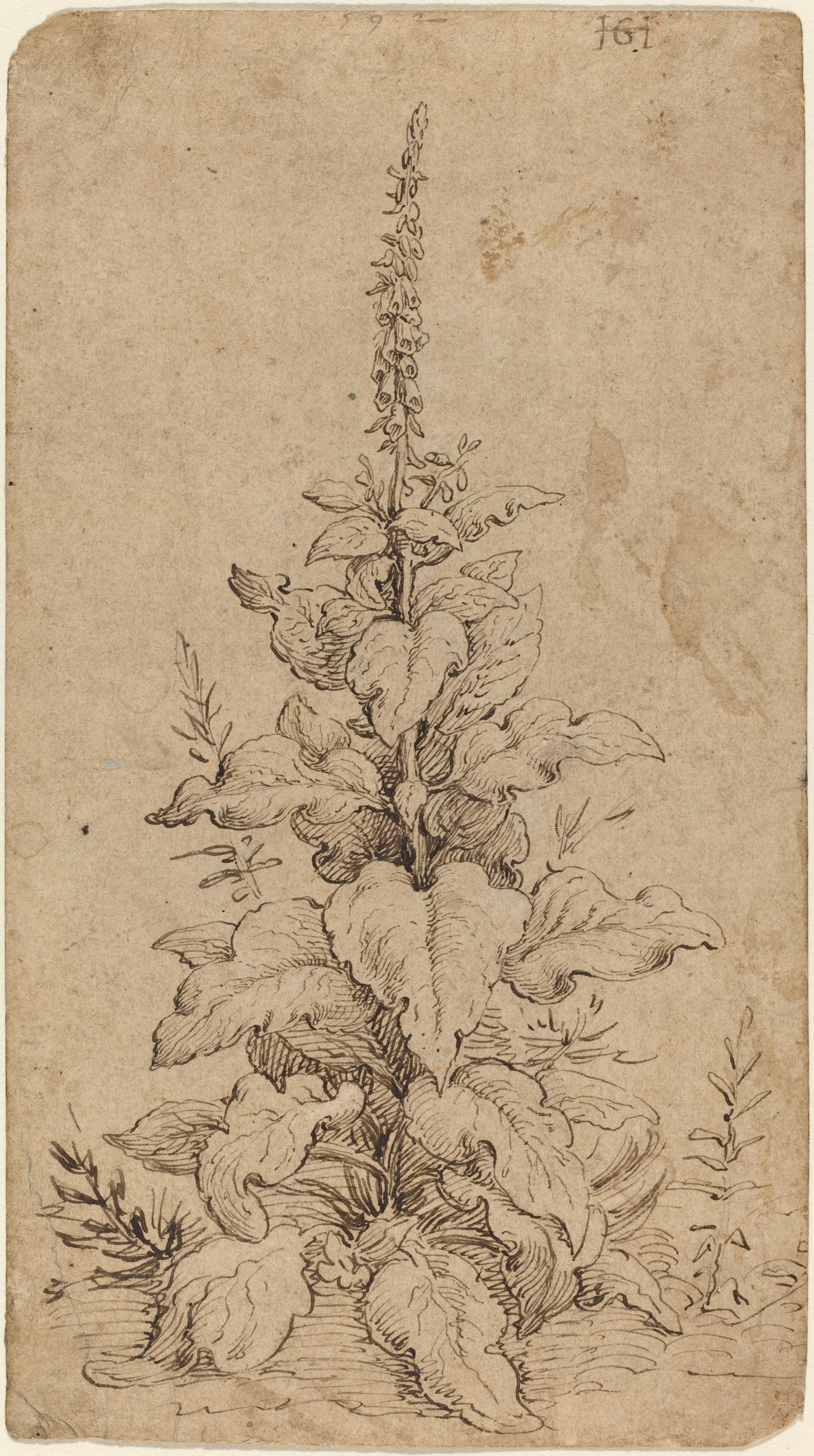
A Foxglove in Bloom, 1592, pen and brown ink on laid paper

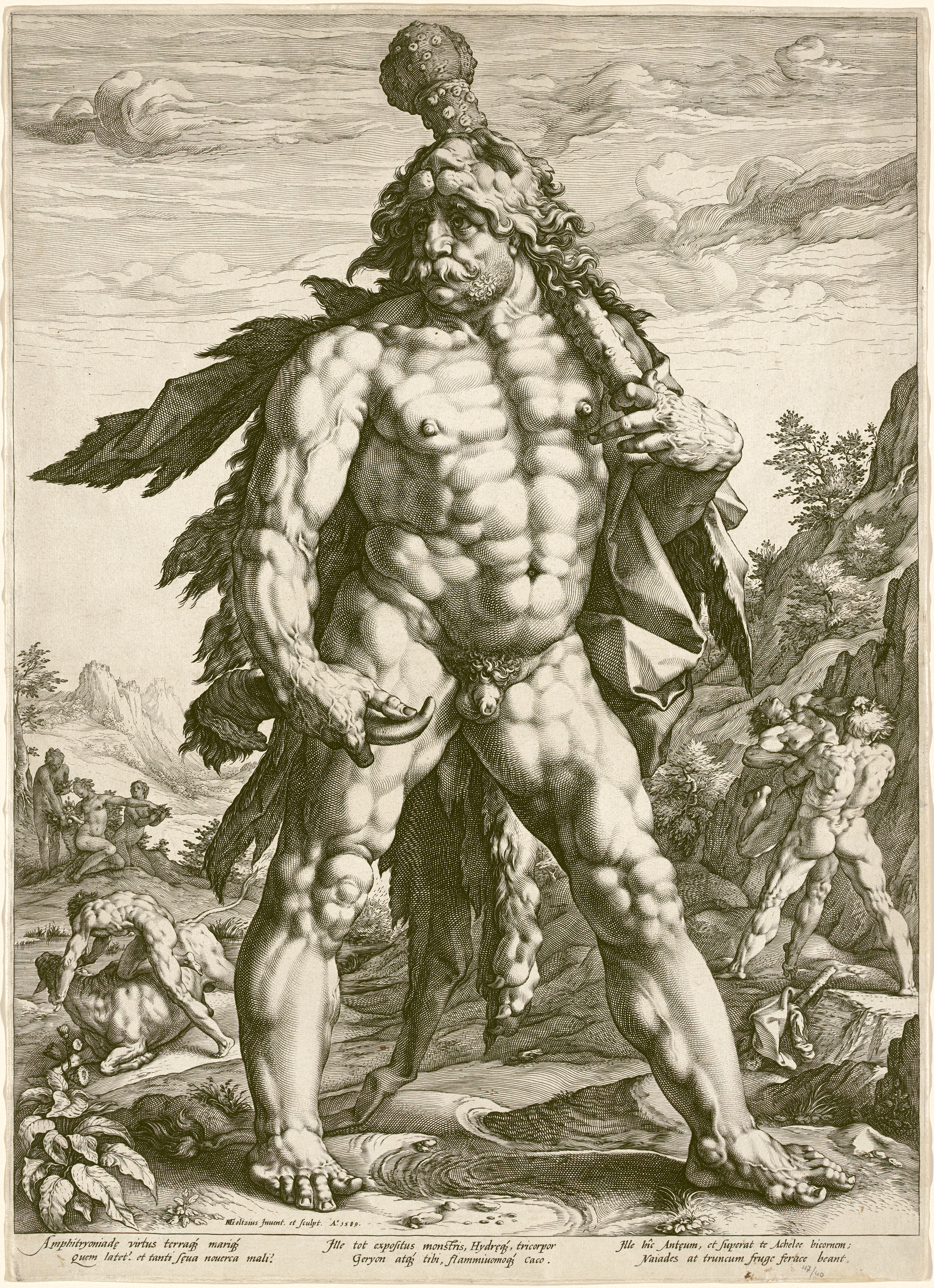
The Great Hercules, 1589

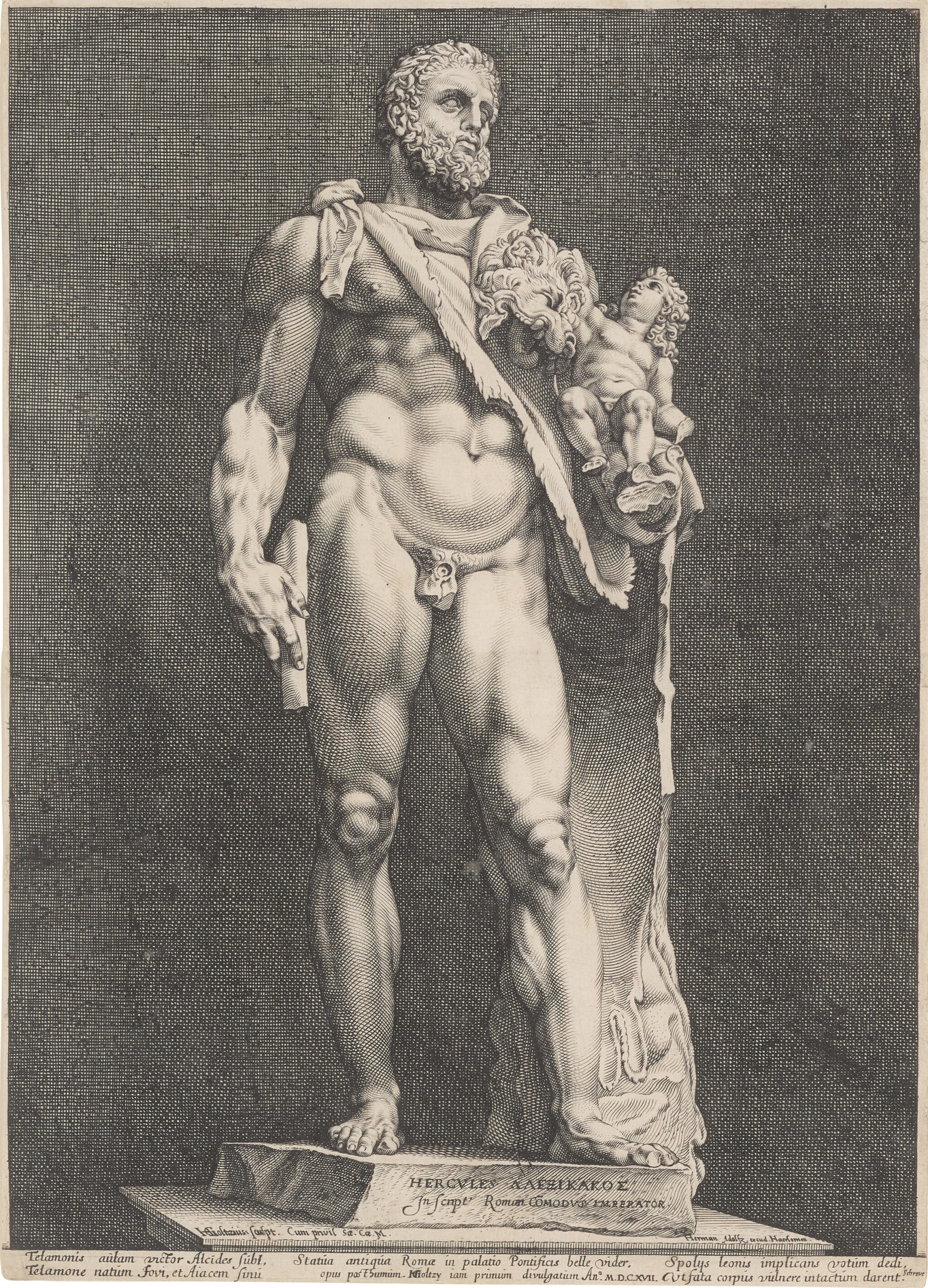
The Emperor Commodus as Hercules, 1592

== Sources ==
- Mayor, A. Hyatt (1971). Prints and People: A Social History of Printed Pictures. New York City: Metropolitan Museum of Art. ISBN 0-691-00326-2.
- Cohn, Marjorie B. (June 2014). "An Interpretation of Four Woodcut Landscapes by Hendrick Goltzius". Print Quarterly. XXXI (2): 144–155.
