= Dirck Coornhert =

Dutch writer, philosopher, translator, politician, and theologian (1522–1590)

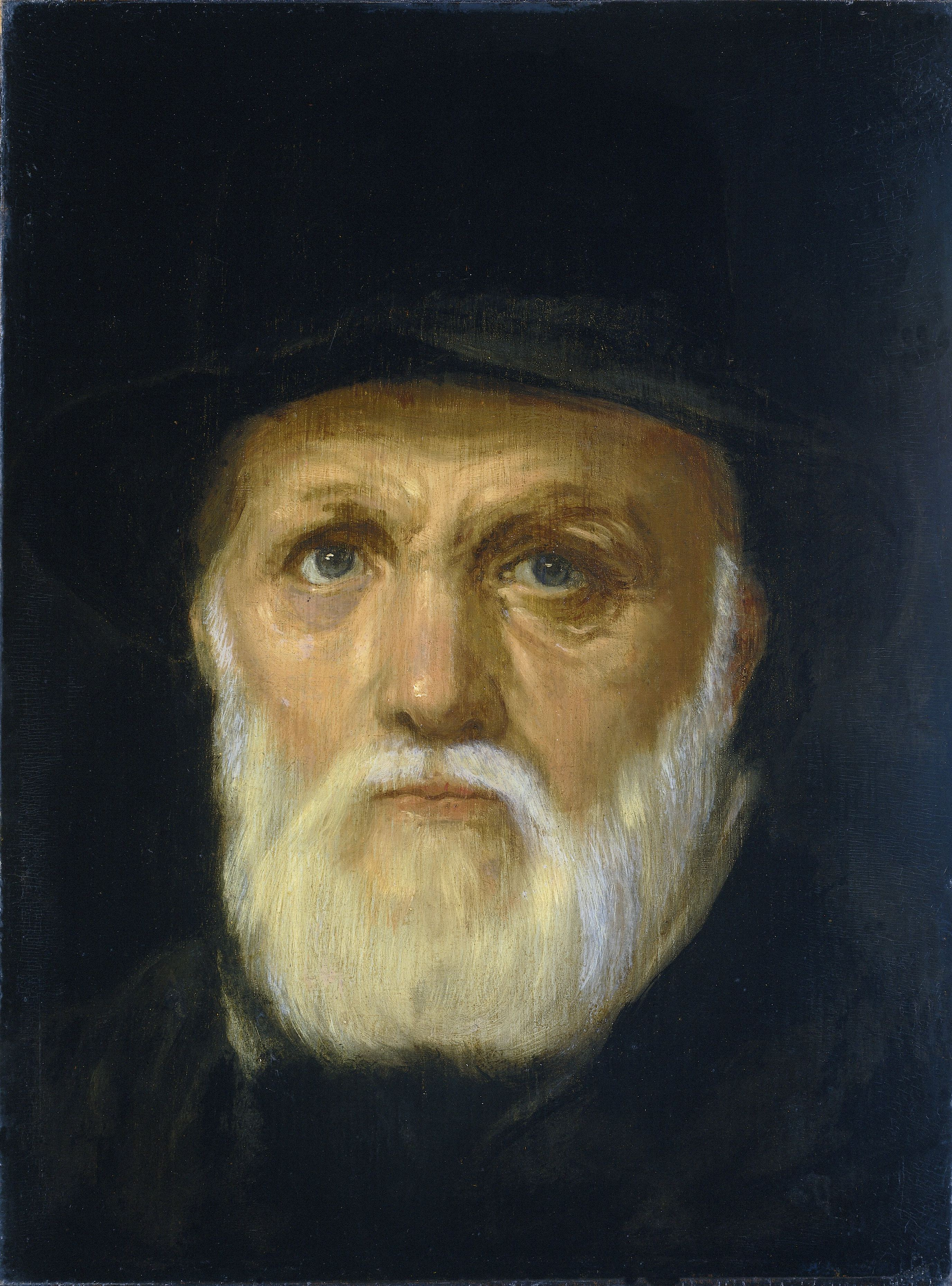
- Portrait by Cornelis van Haarlem
- Born: Dirck Volckertszoon Coornhert; 1522; Amsterdam, Habsburg Netherlands
- Died: 29 October 1590 (aged 68); Gouda, Dutch Republic
- Other name: Theodore Cornhert
- Known for: Writing, philosophy, theology, engraving
- Movement: Humanism

Dirck Volckertszoon Coornhert (1522 – 29 October 1590), also known as Theodore Cornhert, was a Dutch writer, philosopher, translator, politician, theologian, and artist. Coornhert is often considered the Father of Dutch Renaissance scholarship.

== Biography ==
Coornhert was the youngest son of Volckert Coornhert, an Amsterdam cloth merchant. As a child, he spent some years in Spain and Portugal. Returning home, he was disinherited by his father's will in 1539, for his marriage with Cornelia (Neeltje) Simons, a portionless gentlewoman from Haarlem, whose sister was Anna Simonsdr, the mistress of Reginald (Reinoud), count of Brederode (they were the parents of Lucretia van Brederode). He was only seventeen and she was twelve years older. Through his sister-in-law, he became major-domo to Reginald at his castle in Vianen for a short time. Soon after that, in 1541, he bought a house in his wife's hometown of Haarlem on the St. Janssteeg from Anna and her husband Jan. Though he started off working for Reginald, he lived near the school where the St. Jan commanderij taught classic works and commissioned art. Maarten van Heemskerck had just returned from Italy and impressed Coornhert with his work. Coornhert became an engraver on copper and produced works in collaboration with Heemskerck which became popular.

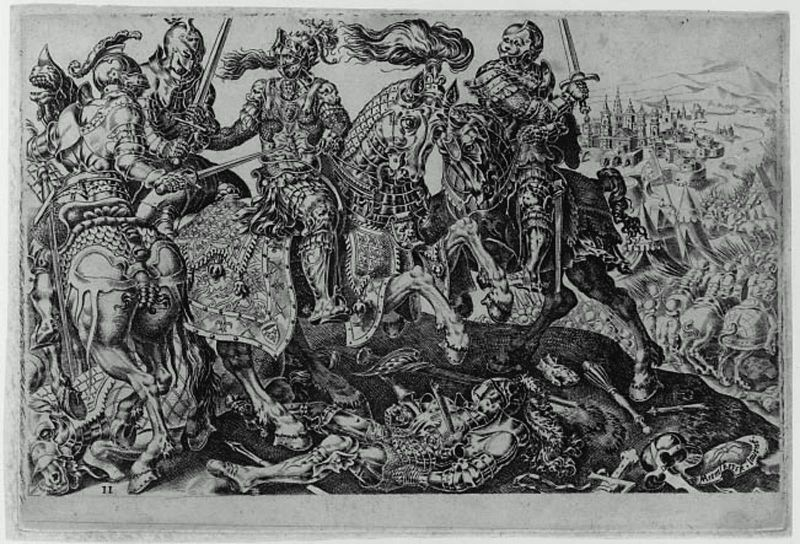
Charles V conquers Tunisia, one of a series of prints drafted by Heemskerck and engraved by Coornhert. This series was noted by Karel van Mander in his Schilderboeck.

After learning Latin in 1552, Coornhert published Dutch translations from Cicero, Seneca and Boethius. His 1562 translation of the first twelve books of Homer's Odyssey is one of the first major works of Dutch Renaissance poetry. He was appointed secretary to the city of Haarlem (1562) and secretary to the burgomasters (1564). Throwing himself into the struggle against Spanish rule, he drew up the manifesto of William the Silent, Prince of Orange (1566).

Imprisoned at the Hague in 1568, he escaped to Cleves, where he maintained himself by his art. Recalled in 1572, he was for a short time secretary of state in the Dutch Republic; his aversion to military violence led him to return to Cleves, where William continued to employ his services and his pen. Possibly inspired by his time in jail, he wrote a book, Boeventucht, on the causes of crime with ideas for more humane methods of punishment and correction.

== Theology ==
Coornhert was also famous as a theologian. At 30, he became interested in theology and desirous of consulting St. Augustine, he commenced the study of Latin. He entered into controversy alike with Catholics and Reformers, with both of whom he refused to take Communion. He said reformers were sadly wanted, but those who called themselves such were not the kind that the church required; what was needed was apostles directly inspired from heaven. Until such were sent, he advised all churches to join together in an undogmatic communion. Coornhert wrote and strove in favor of tolerance, opposing capital punishment for heretics. He had no party views; he criticized the Heidelberg Catechism, which was authoritative in the Dutch Republic. Jacobus Arminius, employed to refute him, was won over by his arguments.

== Pupils ==
According to the Netherlands Institute for Art History (RKD), his pupils were Hendrick Goltzius, Philip Galle, and Cornelis Cort.

== Works ==
In addition to the 1566 manifesto, Coornhert wrote a treatise against the capital punishment of heretics, a pamphlet defending the rebellion of the United Provinces, a preface to the Dutch grammar published by the Society of Rhetoricians of Amsterdam, and several poems, including, according to some, the popular song, Wilhelmus van Nassouwe. Others, however, attributed it to Philip van Marnix. In 1586, he produced his original masterpiece, the Zedekunst ("Art of Ethics"). In 1587, he published Boeventucht, an essay about the punishment of the ruffians.

By the time he died in 1590, his Dutch translation of the New Testament (following the Latin version of Erasmus) was left unfinished. His collected prose and verse works were published in 1630 in 3 volumes.

Isaac D'Israeli called him "one of the fathers of Dutch literature, and even of their arts."

== Quotes ==
- "Each wants to dictate another's creed ... This is done by those who formerly taught that such things do not become the Christian."
- "Rest Elsewhere" (his motto).
- "...a voluntary crowbar to the murderous prison of conscience" (on himself).
