= Reuland Castle =

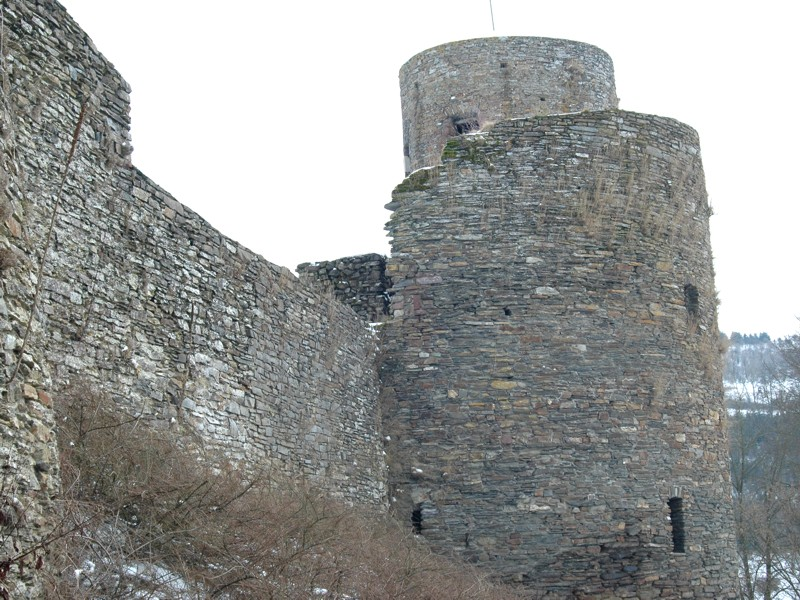
- Castle Reuland (2006)

- Location within Belgium

General information
- Type: hillside castle, settlement
- Classification: Ruins
- Location: Burg-Reuland
- Coordinates: 50°11′44.5″N 6°8′4″E
- Completed: 1100 till 1300
- Owner: Gentry

Reuland Castle is a castle in southeast Belgium, Burg-Reuland, near the border of Germany, probably built after 1148 by the von Reuland nobles.

The castle was sold in 1322 to Count John the Blind and the King of Bohemia. On 24 May 1384 King Wenzel of Luxembourg designated Edmund von Engelsdorf the Secretary of the Treasury of Luxembourg, and donated the Castle and the Reuland Domain (comprising the villages Oberbesslang and Niederbesslang) to him.

== See also ==
- List of castles in Belgium
