= Thommen, Belgium =

Thommen
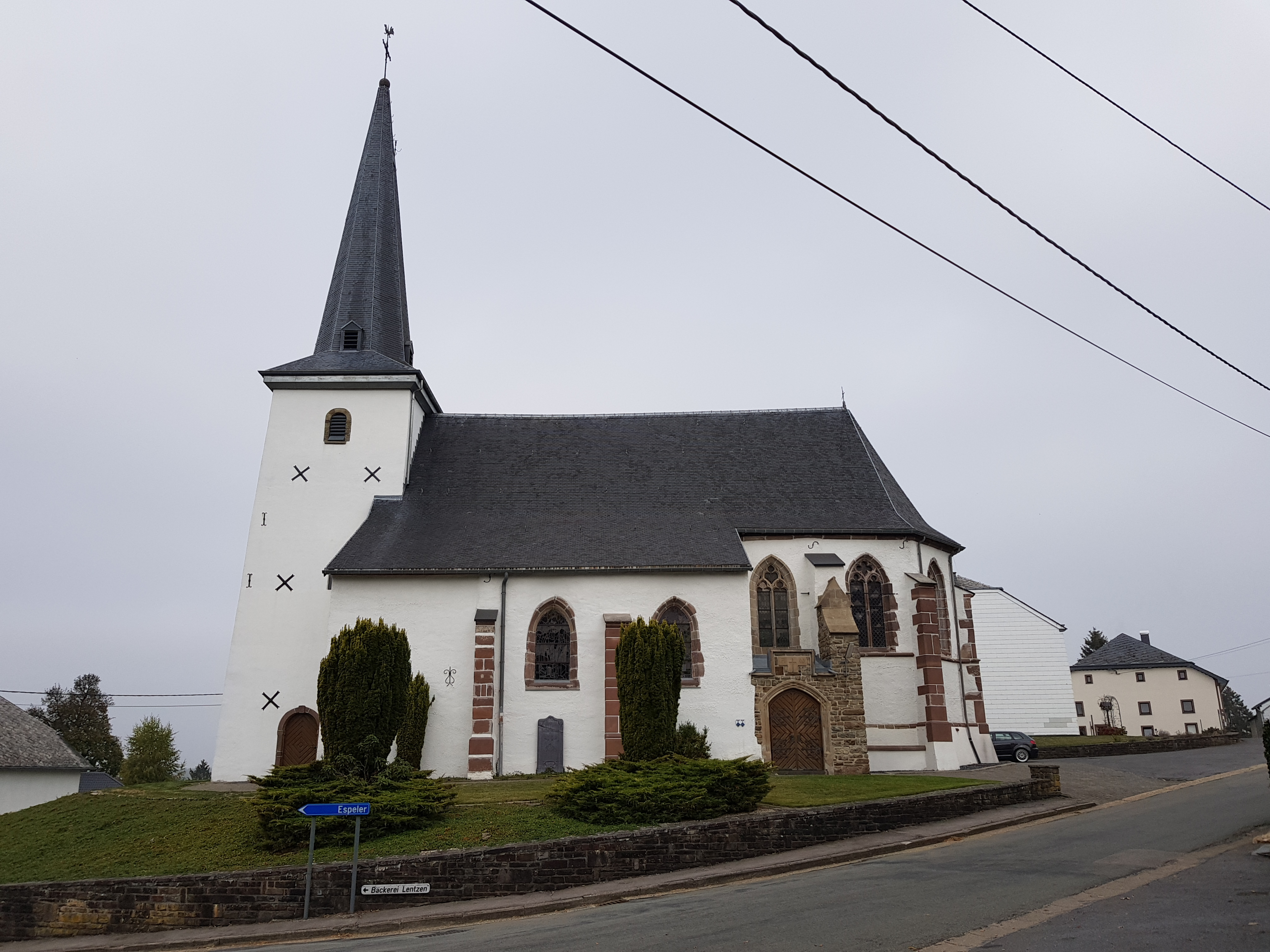
- Thommen, village church

- Location within Belgium Location within Europe
- Coordinates: 50°13′08″N 06°04′25″E
- Country: Belgium
- Region: Wallonia
- Province: Liège
- Municipality: Burg-Reuland

Thommen (German pronunciation: [ˈtɔmən]) is a district of the municipality of Burg-Reuland, located in the province of Liège in Wallonia, Belgium.

Thommen derives its name from the Latin ad tumbas, "by the tombs", and remains of Celtic tumuli have been identified close to the village. It is mentioned in written sources for the first time in 814, but the settlement is older and originated as a Roman villa located on the Roman road connecting Reims with Cologne. The district contains the main village of Thommen and several hamlets.

The village church originated as a chapel during Frankish times, and may have been built at the site of an earlier Roman temple. The current, largely Gothic building dates mainly from the 15th century. It was enlarged in a Neo-Gothic style in 1910.
