= Petit Granit =

Blue grayish granite found in Belgium, France and Germany

Petit Granit (also known by a variety of names including: Nero Belga, Granit de Flandre, Pierre Bleue, Blue Stone, Belgian Granite, Belgian Blue Limestone, Arduin) is, despite its name, a grey-bluish limestone, rather than being a true granite. It is mined exclusively in Belgium, where use of the name Petit Granit is subject to an Appellation d’Origine Locale (Local Appellation of Origin) designation. The stone becomes shiny black on polishing and is considered to be an easily worked and versatile dimension stone. It has also been used widely in sculpture and architecture, especially in Brussels and other Belgian cities. Petit Granit has been designated by the International Union of Geological Sciences as a Global Heritage Stone Resource.

== Examples ==
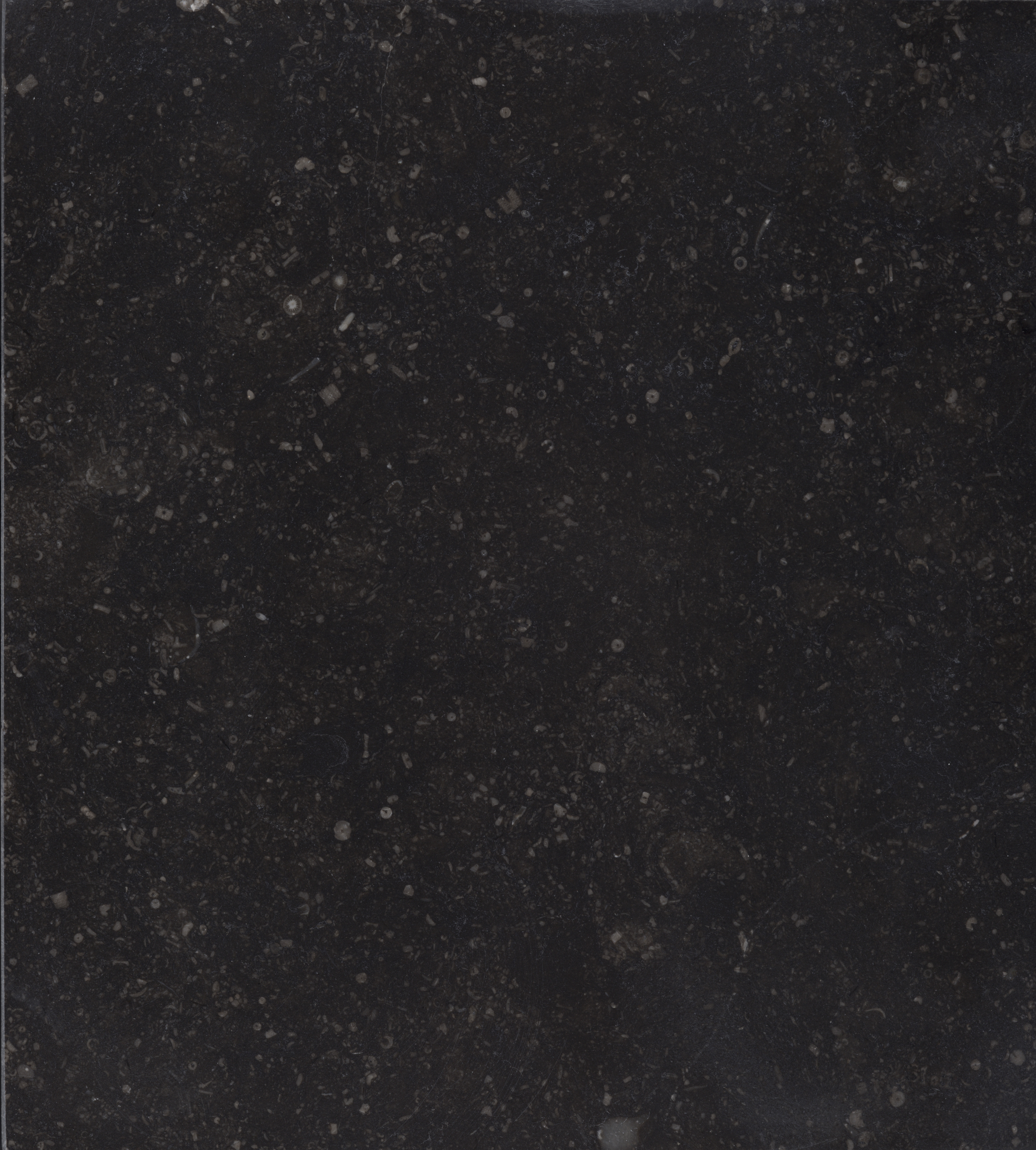

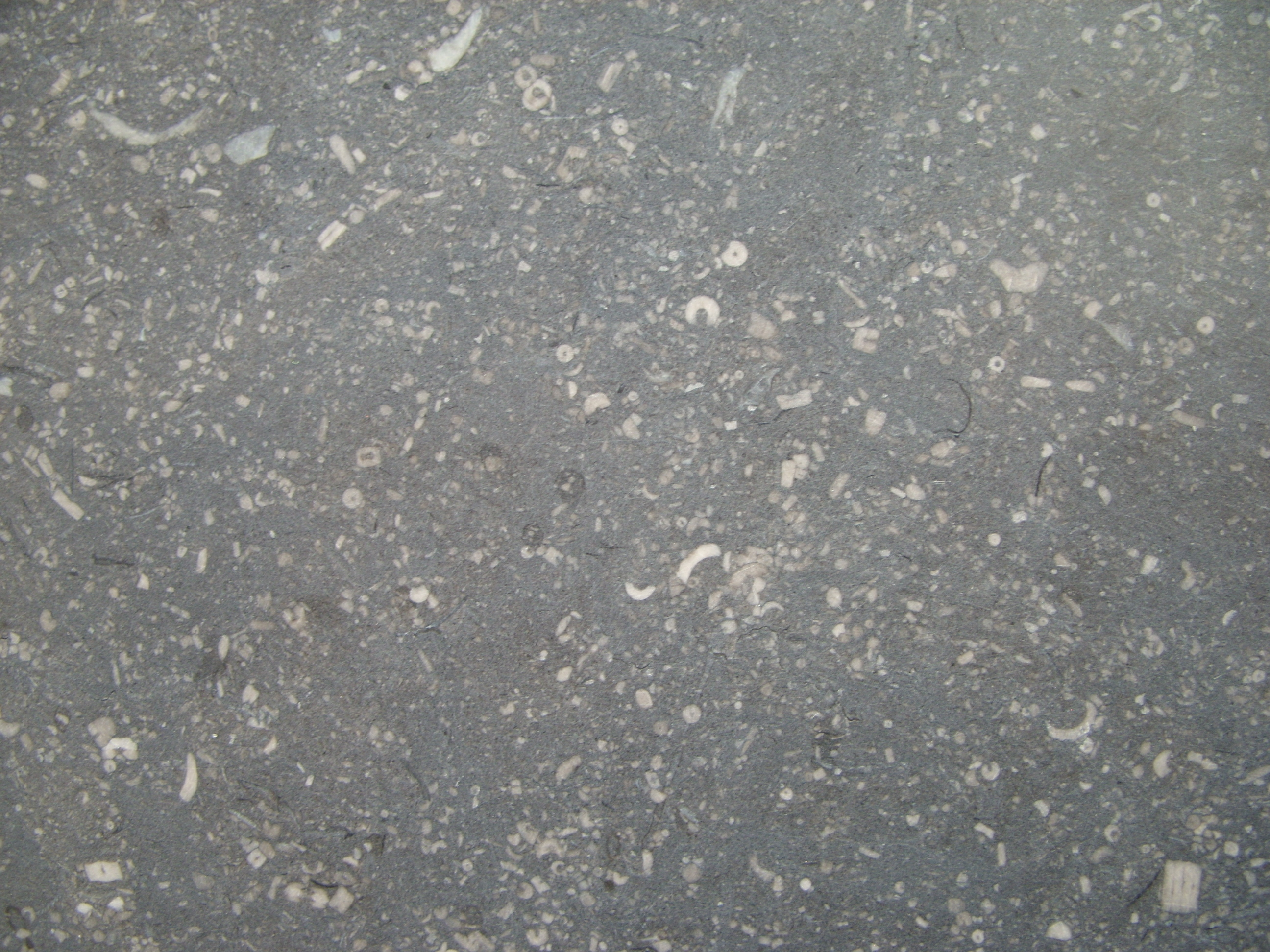

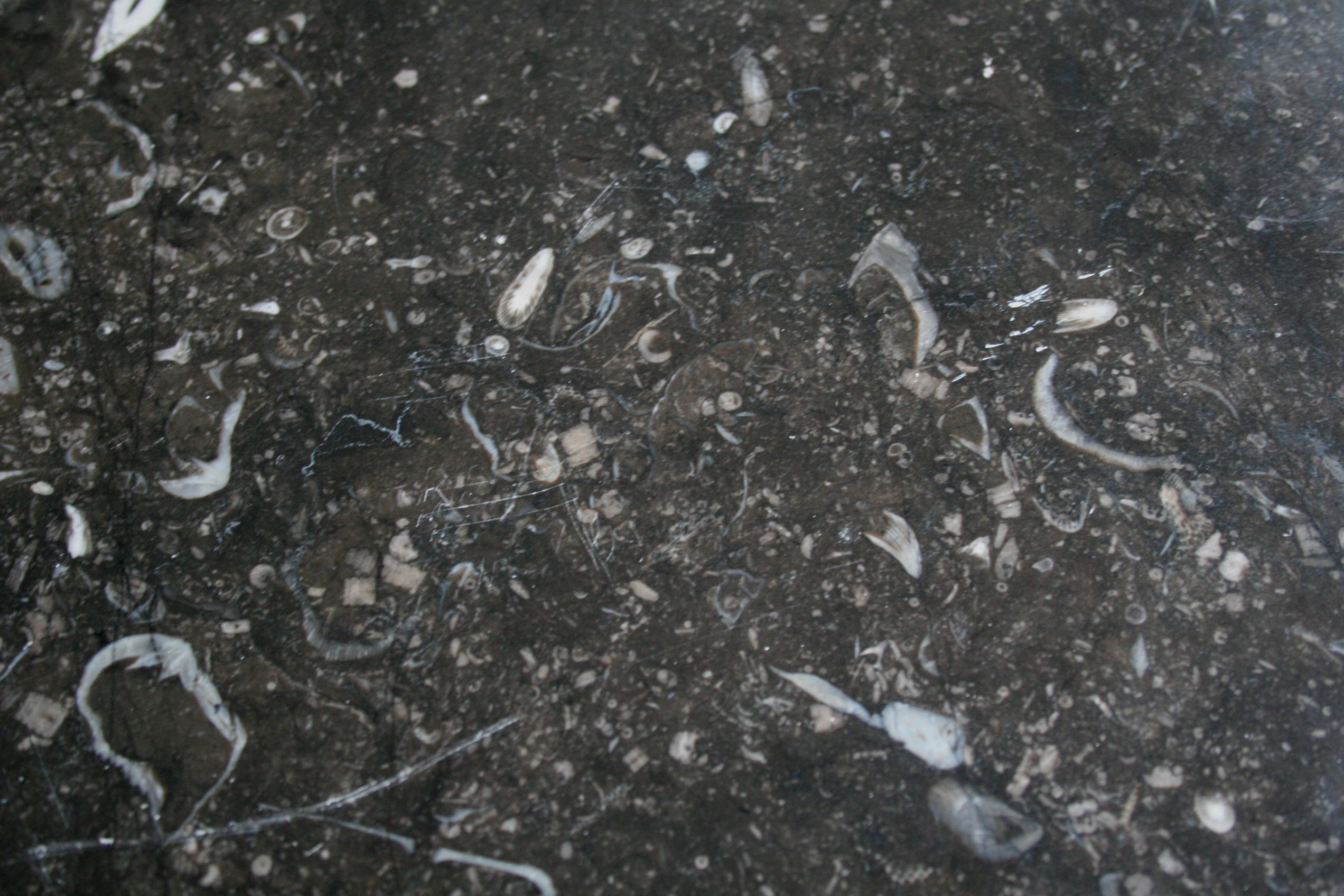

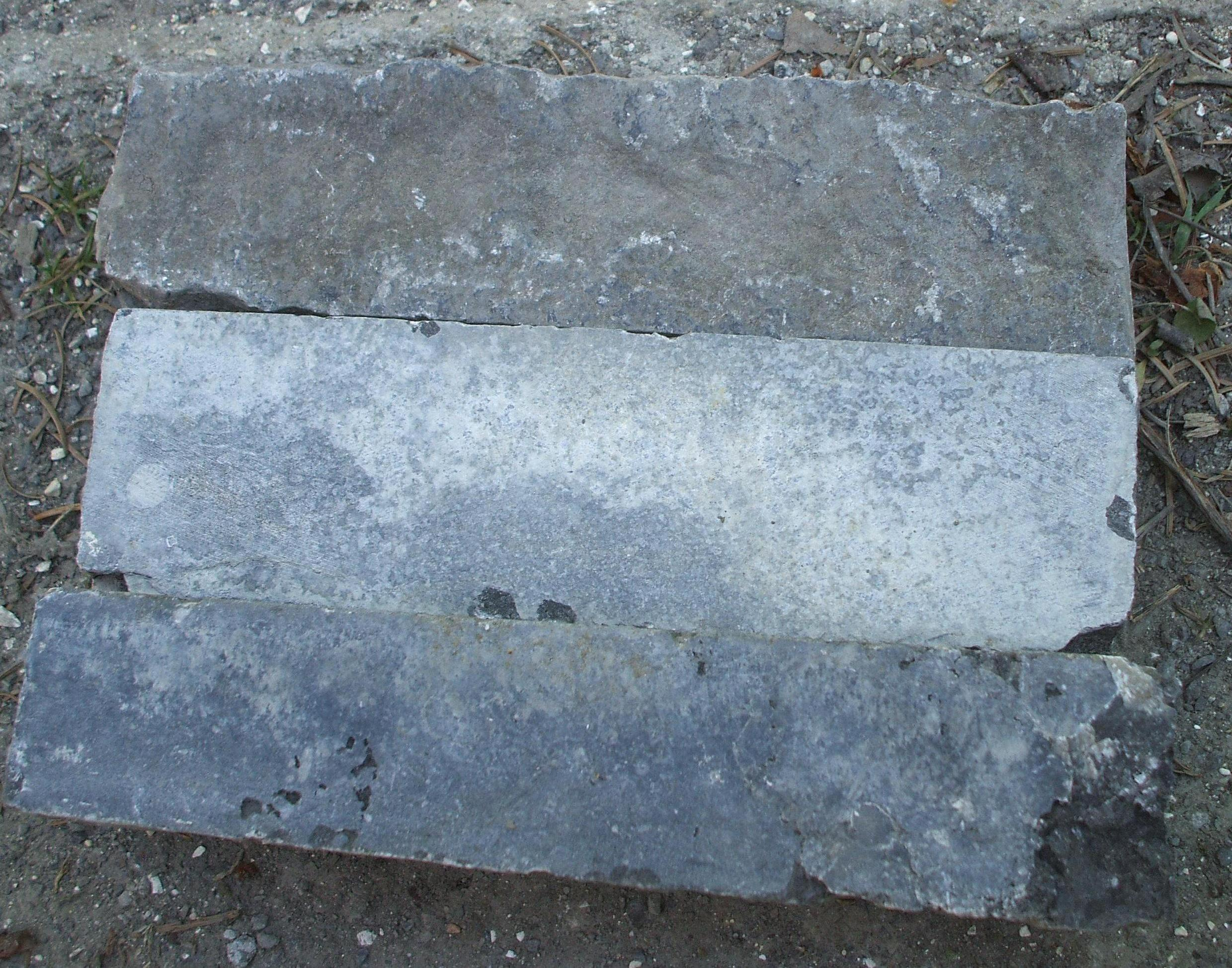

== Uses ==
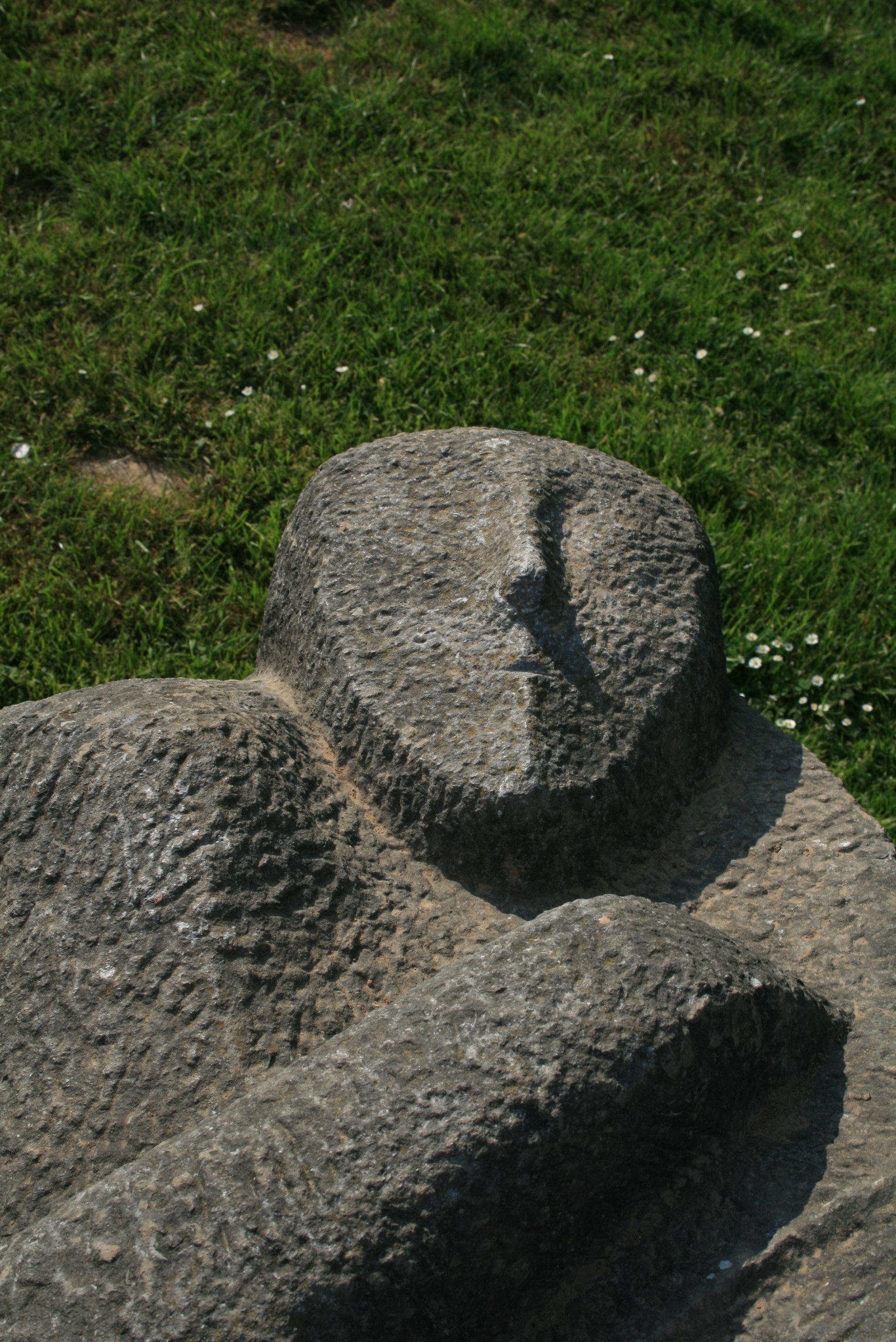
Sculpture: Sun bath by Michel Smolders

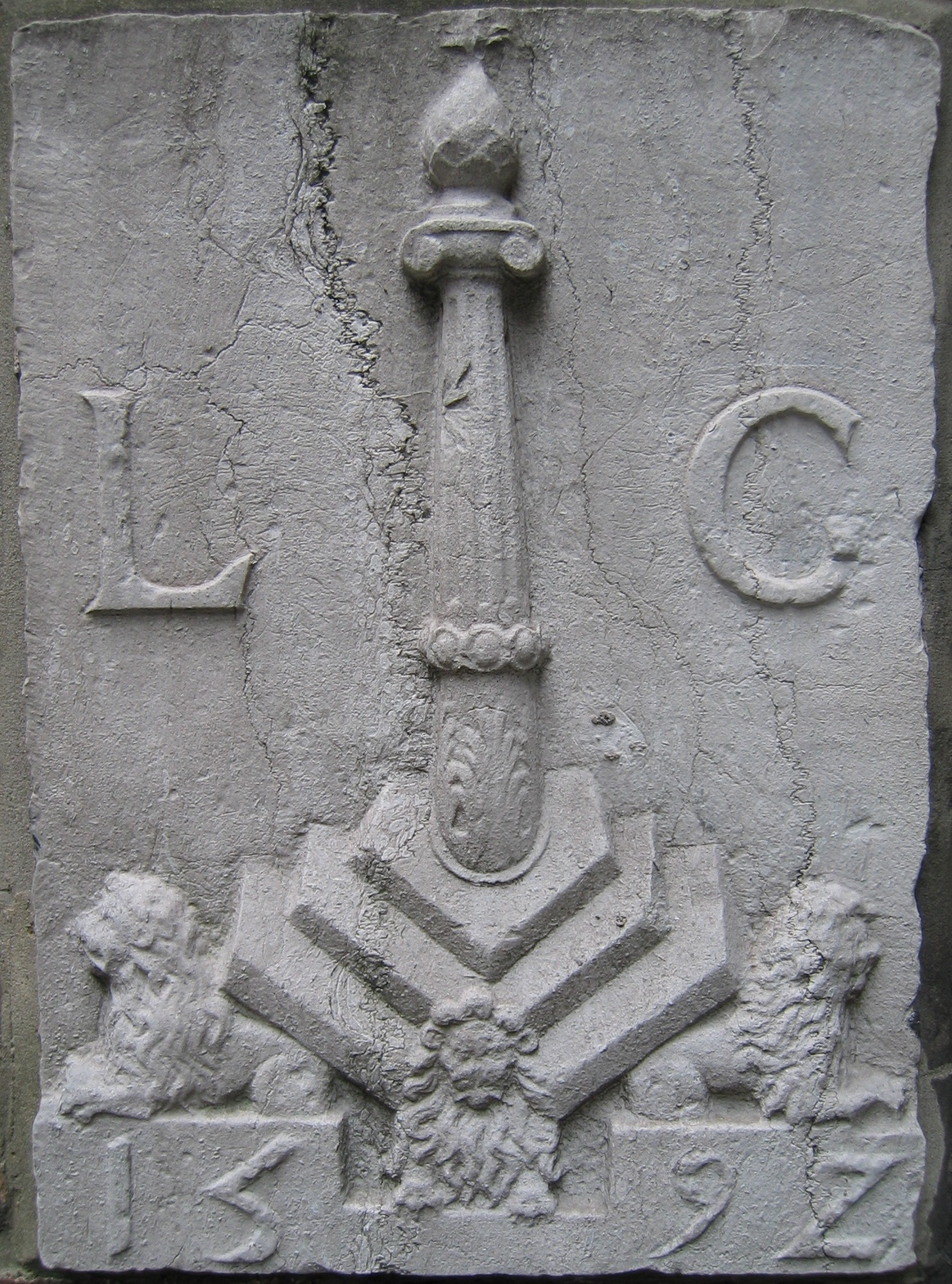
Sculpture: Crest of Liège dated 1592

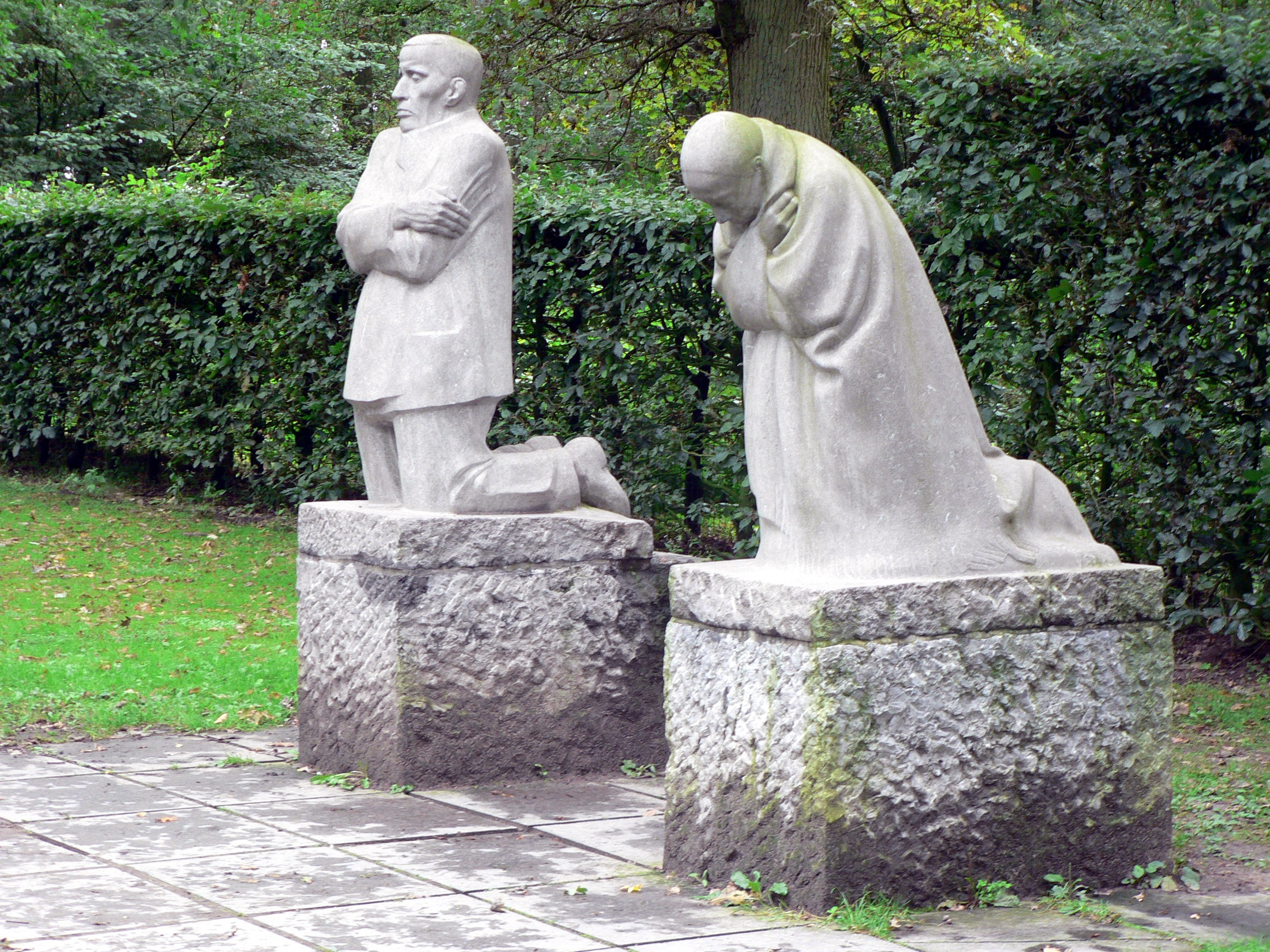
Sculpture: The Grieving Parents by Käthe Kollwitz

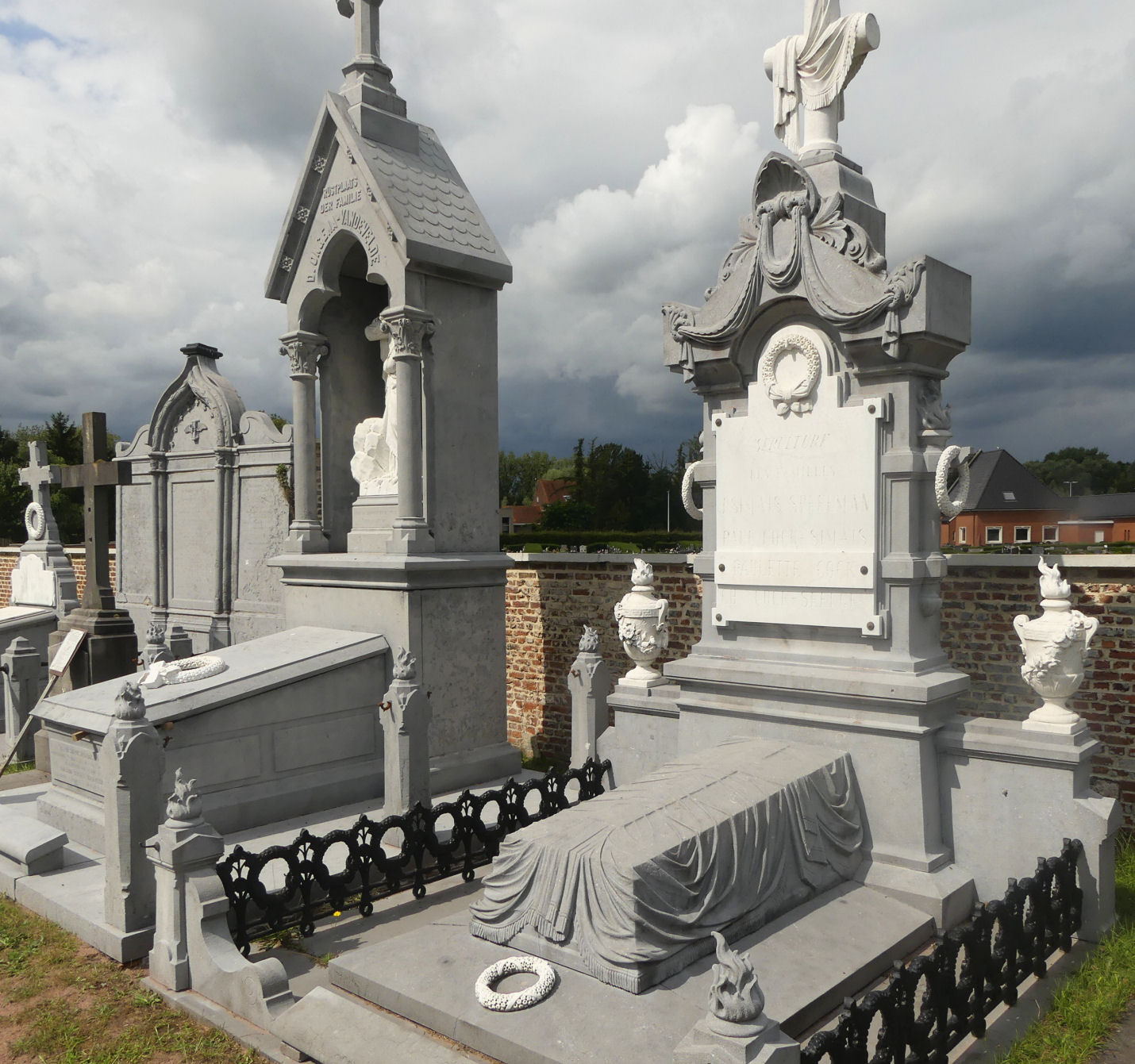
Tombs: Oude-Brug Cemetery, Lokeren

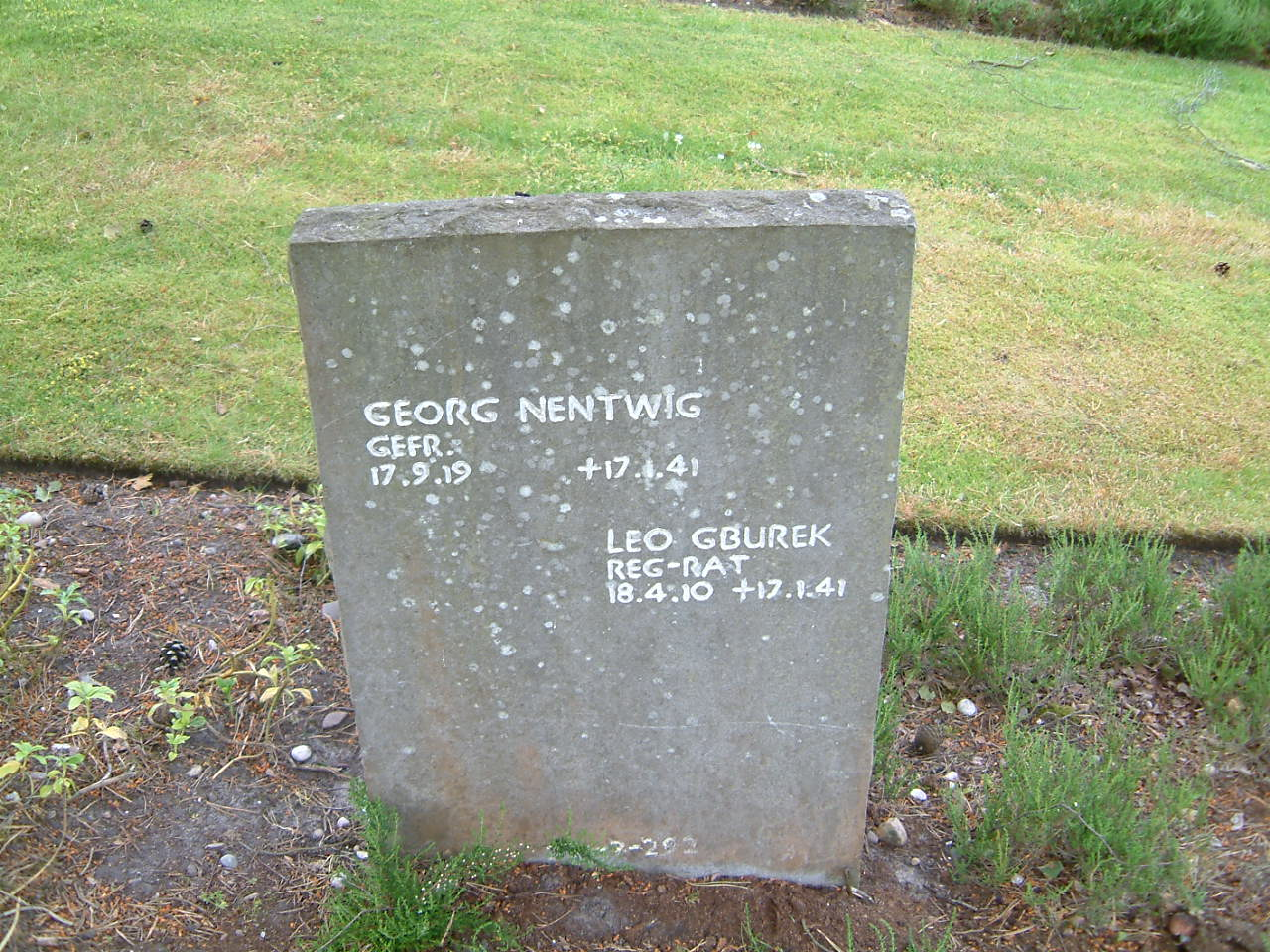
Headstones: Cannock Chase German Military Cemetery

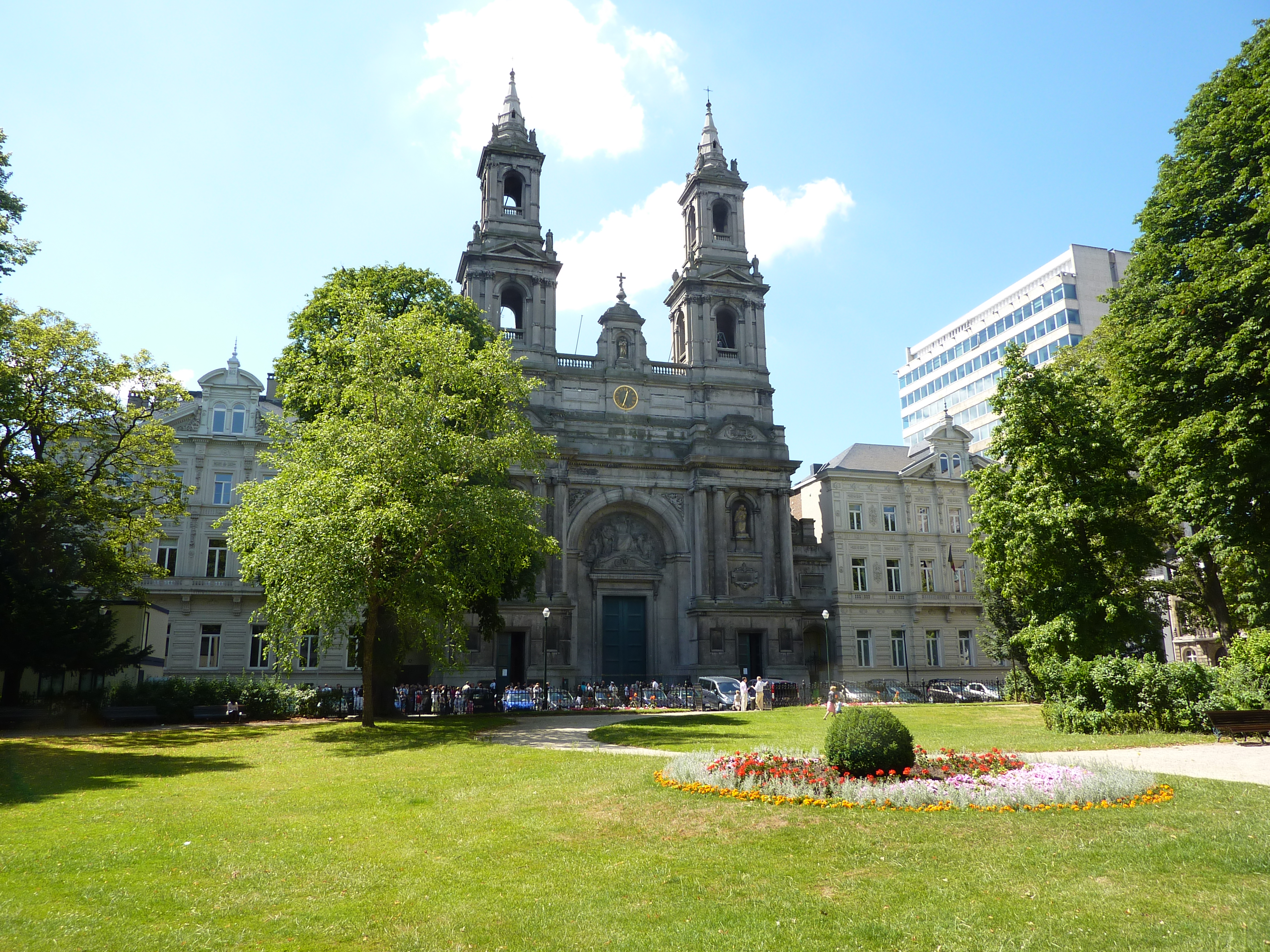
Architecture: Church of St. Joseph, Brussels

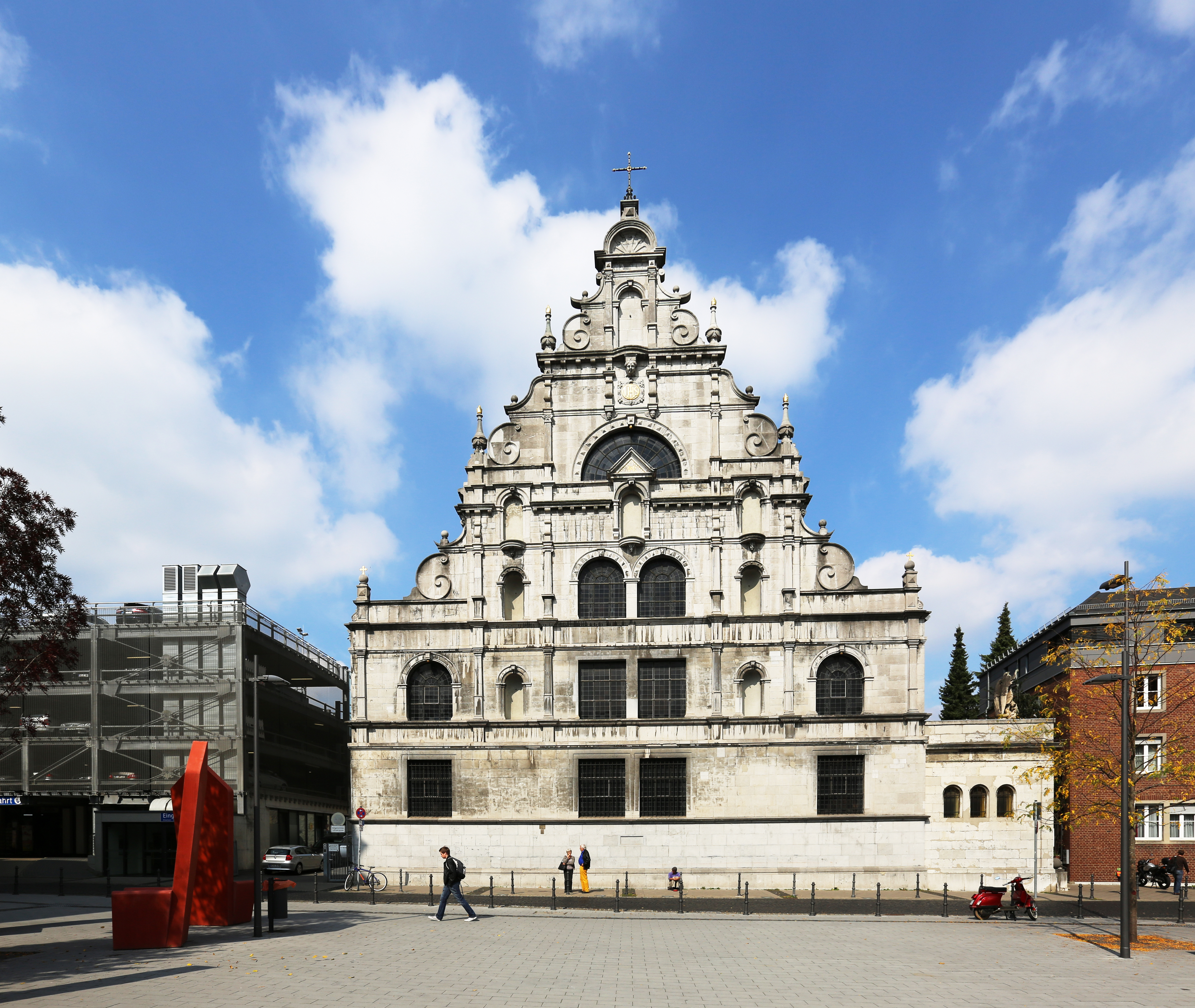
Architecture: St. Michael's Church, Aachen
