= List of protected heritage sites in Burg-Reuland =

This table shows an overview of the protected heritage sites in the Walloon town Burg-Reuland. This list is part of Belgium's national heritage.

Object	Year/architect	Town/section	Address	Coordinates	Number	Image
Belgian-Prussian border markers 76-92 ^{(nl)} ^{(de)}		Burg-Reuland		50.308639°N 6.013061°E	31215 Info	
Burcht Reuland (ruins) ^{(nl)} ^{(de)}		Burg-Reuland	Reuland	50.195944°N 6.134412°E	31020 Info	Burcht Reuland (ruins)
St. Stephanus church ^{(nl)} ^{(de)}		Burg-Reuland	Reuland	50.195672°N 6.136284°E	31024 Info	St. Stephanus church
House of Orley ^{(nl)} ^{(de)}		Burg-Reuland		50.195333°N 6.136222°E	31023 Info	House of Orley
House Dorf ^{(nl)} ^{(de)}		Burg-Reuland		50.194772°N 6.135388°E	31022 Info	House Dorf
Tumulus of Hochtumsknopf ^{(nl)} ^{(de)}		Burg-Reuland		50.231679°N 6.058500°E	31291 Info	Tumulus of Hochtumsknopf
Castle Oberhausen ^{(nl)} ^{(de)}		Burg-Reuland		50.157634°N 6.139276°E	31017 Info	Castle Oberhausen
St. Peter church ^{(nl)} ^{(de)}		Burg-Reuland		50.142273°N 6.139339°E	31018 Info	St. Peter church
Pastorage ^{(nl)} ^{(de)}		Burg-Reuland		50.141861°N 6.139495°E	31019 Info	Pastorage
Schiebachtal ^{(nl)} ^{(de)}		Burg-Reuland		50.144204°N 6.138229°E	31054 Info	Schiebachtal
Stone hill west of Rittersprunges ^{(nl)} ^{(de)}		Burg-Reuland		50.143515°N 6.136317°E	31051 Info	Stone hill west of Rittersprunges
St. Remacluse church ^{(nl)} ^{(de)}		Burg-Reuland	Thommen	50.219377°N 6.073829°E	31025 Info	St. Remacluse church
Presbytery ^{(nl)} ^{(de)}		Burg-Reuland	Thommen	50.219377°N 6.073829°E	31030 Info	Presbytery
Thommer Weiher (pond) ^{(nl)} ^{(de)}		Burg-Reuland		50.223474°N 6.053958°E	31052 Info	Thommer Weiher (pond)
St. Hubert chapel ^{(nl)} ^{(de)}		Burg-Reuland		50.193853°N 6.150438°E	31001 Info	St. Hubert chapel
Huis Dürler (old house) ^{(nl)} ^{(de)}		Burg-Reuland		50.190386°N 6.069892°E	31016 Info	Huis Dürler (old house)
"Im Kollerwinkel" burial mounds ^{(nl)} ^{(de)}		Burg-Reuland		50.213262°N 6.112046°E	31298 Info	"Im Kollerwinkel" burial mounds
Kleinhardt burial mounds ^{(nl)} ^{(de)}		Burg-Reuland		50.221714°N 6.122340°E	31297 Info	Kleinhardt burial mounds
House Burg-Reuland 143 ^{(nl)} ^{(de)}		Burg-Reuland		50.1965426014229°N 6.13962852648922°E	32238 Info	House Burg-Reuland 143

== See also ==
- Lists of protected heritage sites in the German-speaking Community of Belgium
- List of protected heritage sites in Liège (province)
- Burg-Reuland
