= Burin (engraving) =

Steel cutting tool for engraving

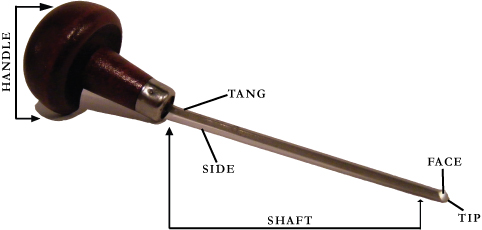
A burin diagram, showing the handle, shaft, cutting tip, and face. The bend in the shaft is especially associated with wood engraving.

A burin (/ˈbjʊərɪn, ˈbɜːrɪn/ BUR(E)-in) is a steel cutting tool used in engraving, from the French burin (cold chisel). Its older English name and synonym is graver.

== Etymology ==
The term burin refers to a tool used by engravers that has a thin, pointed blade and is used to etch or cut. The first known use of the word dates back to France in the mid-1600s, when the term was coined for the tool we know today.

== Design ==
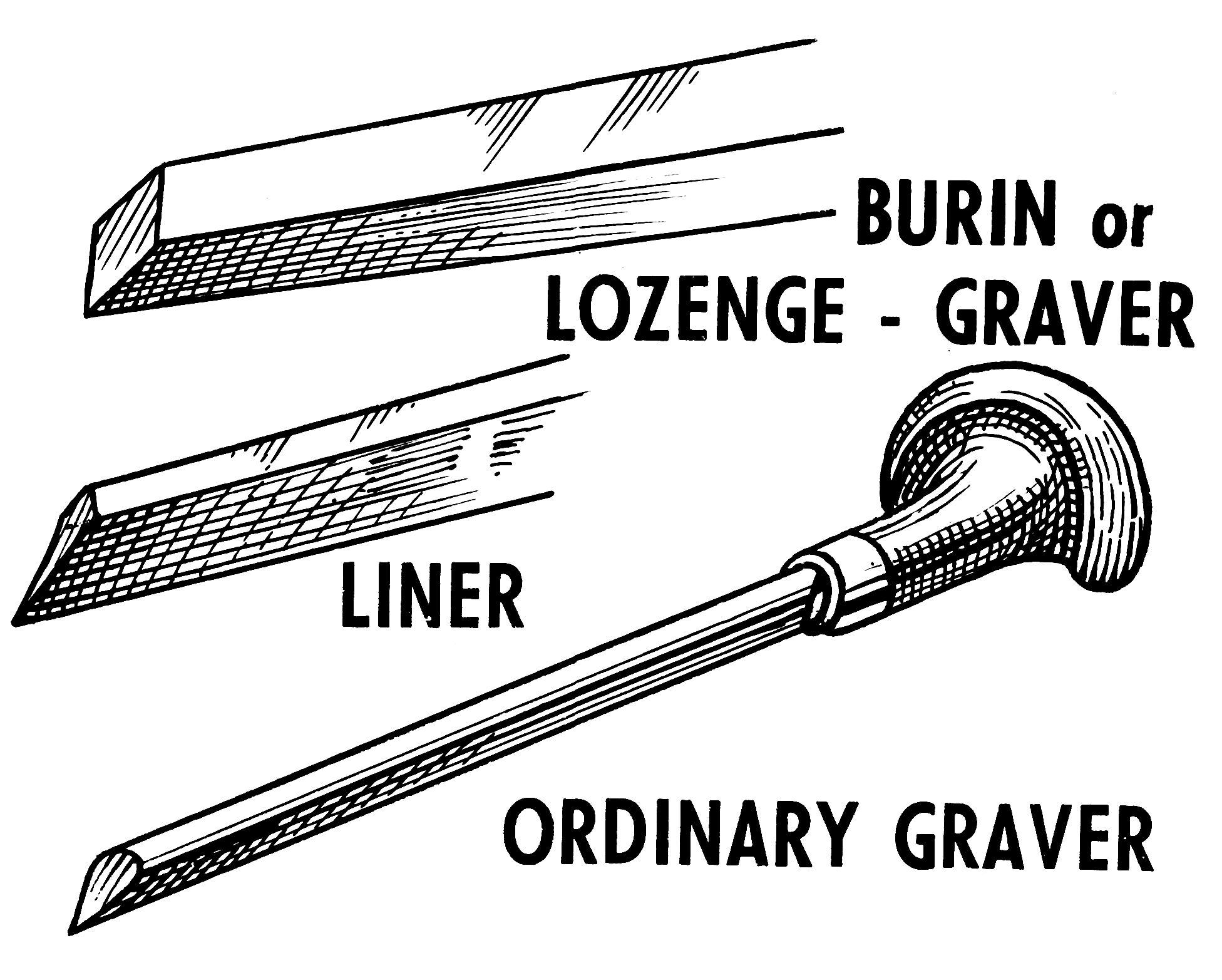
Different blade tips

The burin consists of a rounded handle shaped like a mushroom, and a tempered steel shaft coming from the handle at an angle and ending in a very sharp cutting face, creating a "V"-shaped groove in a printing plate of soft metal, classically copper.

The most ubiquitous types have a square or lozenge face, but there are many others. A tint burin has a square face with teeth, to create many fine, closely spaced lines. Stipple techniques can be done with many flicks of a conventional burin, and this was the earliest technique used. Later wheeled tools called roulettes allowed the easy creation of many fine dots. A flat burin has a rectangular face, and is used for cutting away large portions of material at a time.

== Uses ==
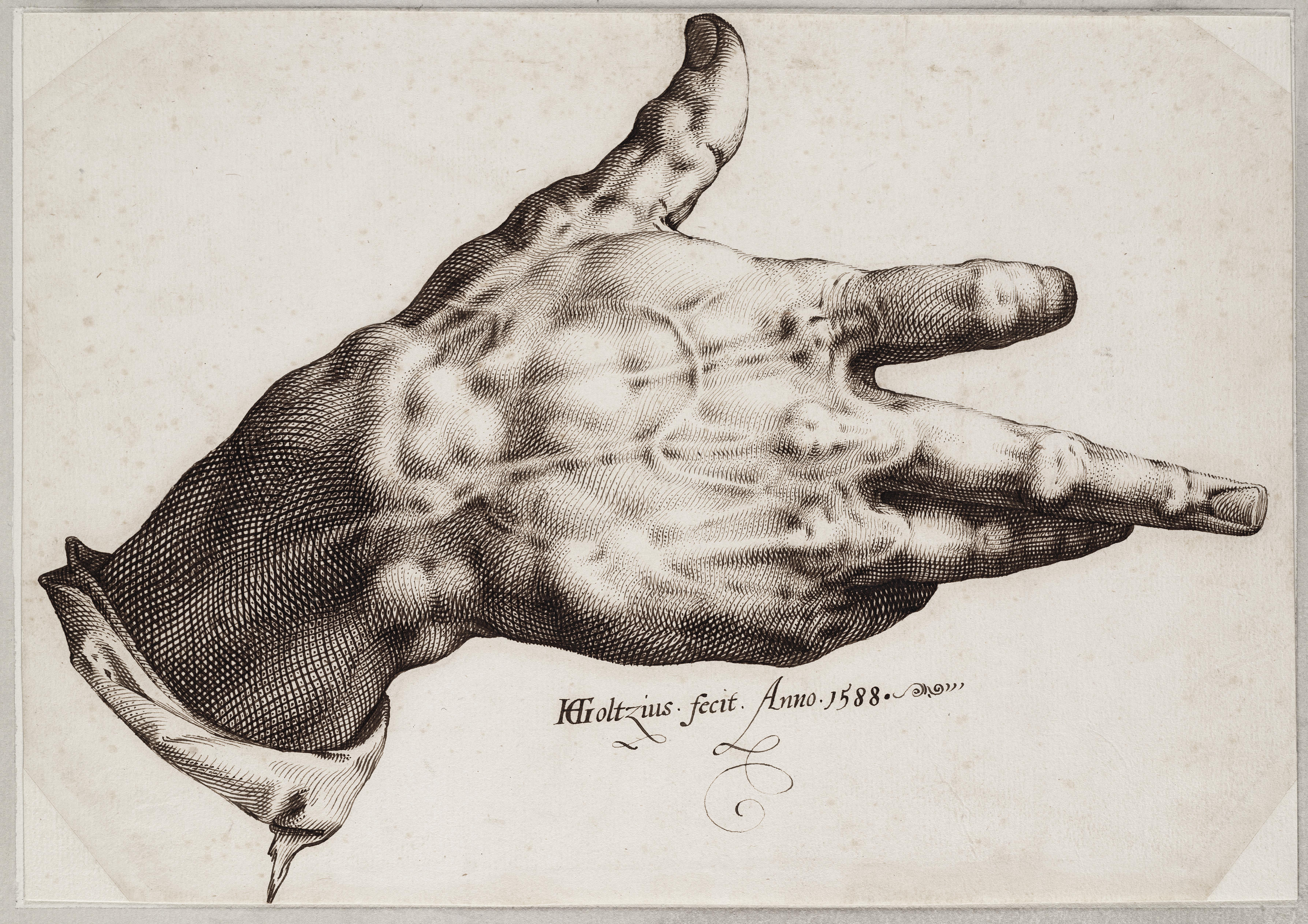
The malformed hand of Hendrik Goltzius, which was especially suited to the use of a burin

An engraving burin is used predominantly by intaglio engravers, but also by relief printmakers in making wood engravings. Usually an engraver will have several tools, of different sizes and shapes of cutting face.

The burin is held at approximately 30° to the surface. The index and middle fingers guide the shaft, while the handle is cradled in the palm. The 16th-century Dutch engraver Hendrick Goltzius found his unusually malformed hand was well suited for cradling and guiding a burin.

The burin was and is also used by goldsmiths to engrave inscriptions or designs on metal, which preceded its use in printmaking.
