= St. Michael's Church, Aachen =

Church in Aachen, Germany

Coordinates: 50°46′25″N 6°04′57″E

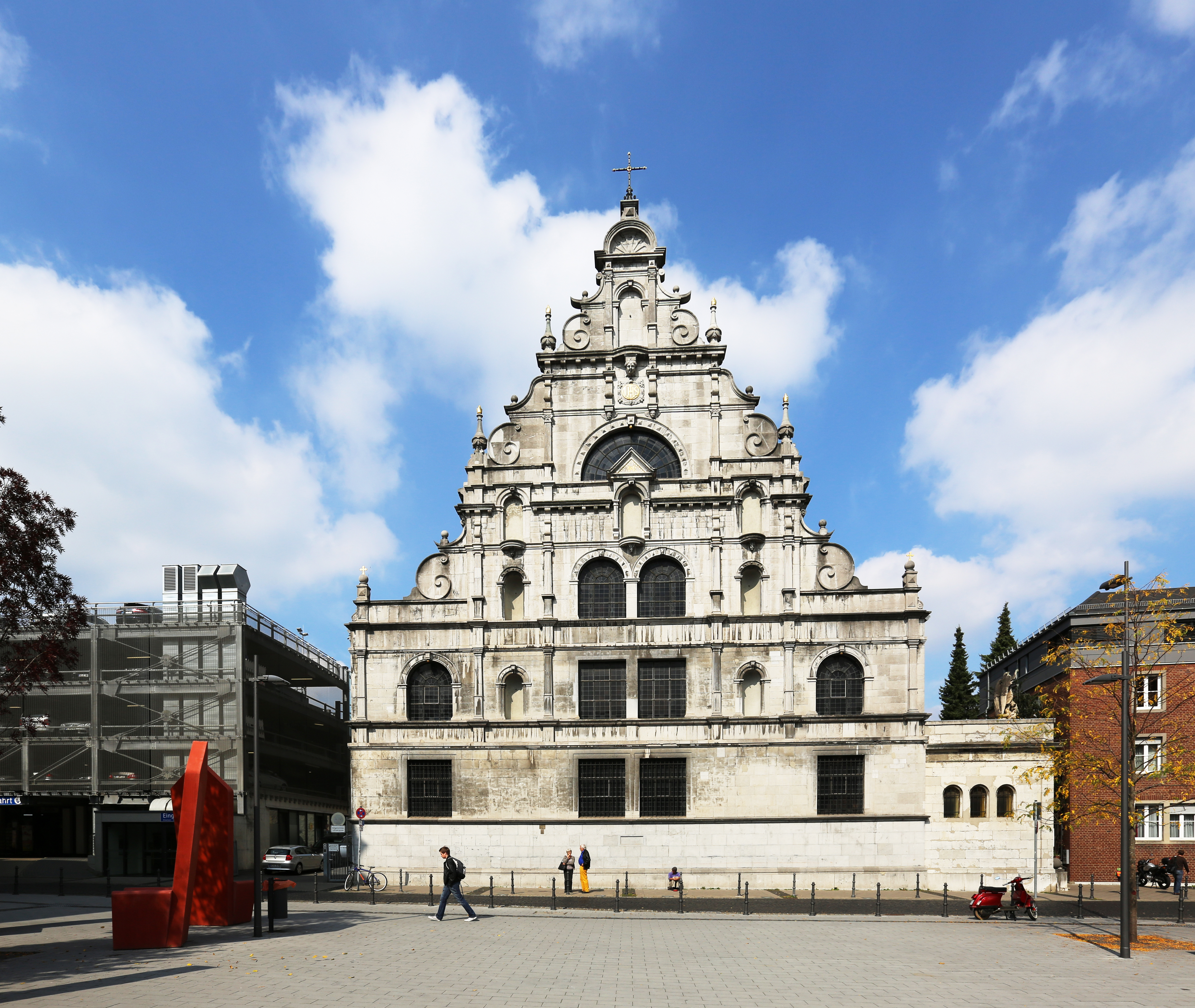
The church as seen from the street

St. Michael's is a church in Aachen, Germany. It was built as a church of the Aachen Jesuit Collegium in 1628, later it was a Catholic parish church and is now a church of the Greek Orthodox Metropolis of Germany. The official name today is Church of Archangel Michael - St Dimitrios (Ναός Αρχαγγέλου Μιχαήλ - Αγίου Δημητρίου).

== History ==
The Jesuitenstrasse (Jesuits road) already existed in Roman times and was the Via Principalis a military camp. In 1579 two Jesuits, who held religious services in the St. Anna Chapel, came to Aachen. They however, left the city in 1581. In 1600 the council of the town took the decision to recruit and settle Jesuits in Aachen. In 1618 the ground-breaking ceremony was held on May 28 and in 1628 the church was completed. Jesuits were important for the town as they were responsible for the educational system at that time, from 1715 they offered a complete theological degree program.

With the dissolution of the Jesuit Order in September 1773 the church was closed and converted into a granary during the French period; it was later used as a parish church. In 1987 the Greek Orthodox community of St. Dimitrios (Ἐνορία Ἁγίου Δημητρίου) which was found in 1963 purchased the building. Beside Orthodox services also ecumenical services are held in it. Recently, due to its good acoustics and location the church enjoys an increasingly popularity by choirs and orchestras.

== Architecture ==
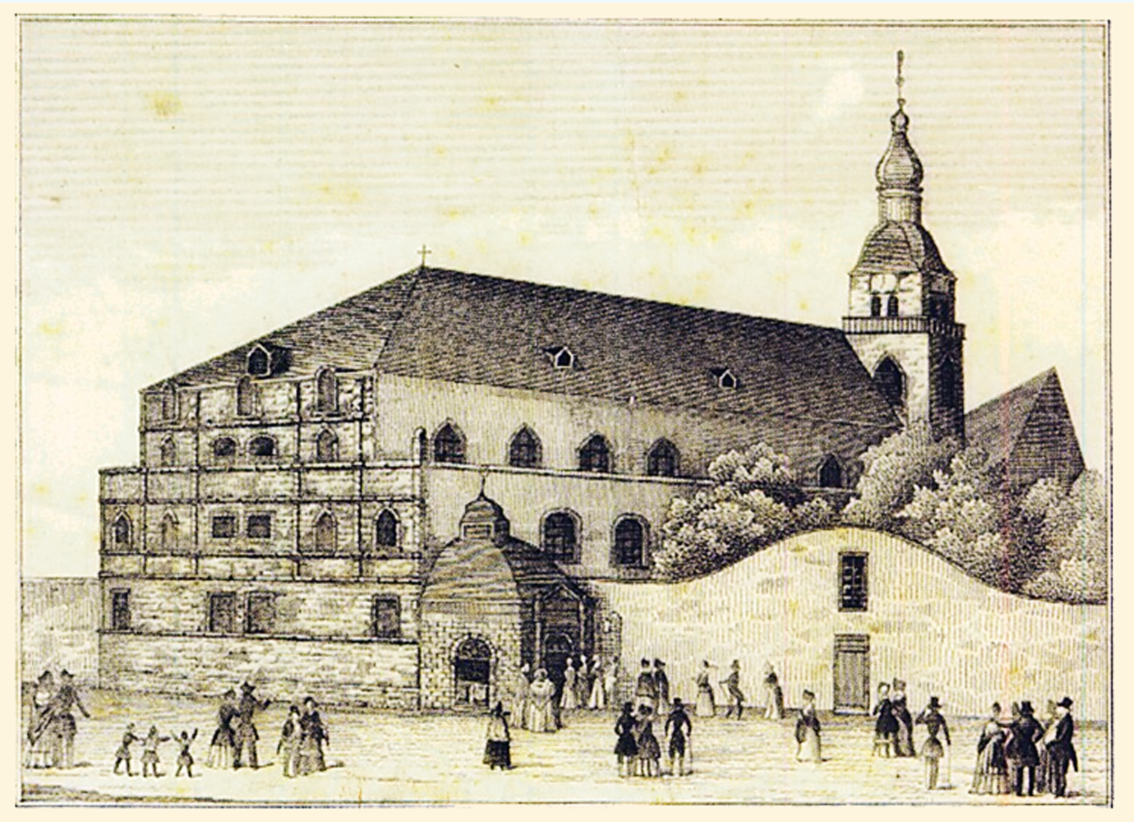
The unfinished facade until 1861

The three-galleried basilica was built between 1617 and 1628, and the tower between 1658 and 1668 which this is oriented to the northwest and is located at the front of the choir. The building is stylistically attributed to the Rhine mannerism. Due to the many similarities of the design and the execution of both the Jesuit church in Molsheim and Church of the Assumption in Cologne the church is attributed to the Baroque architect Christoph Wamser. However, the vertically structured facade of the Renaissance-building remained unfinished until 1891 when the historistic architect Peter Friedrich Peters added some parts. In the niches there were once small statues, but they were stolen a few years later. The now empty niches are illuminated today. During the Second World War the building was badly damaged, the reconstruction of simplified roof was held until 1951. Orthodox paintings in the interior were added in 1997 and 2002 by the artist Christophanis Voutsinas.

== See also ==
- List of Jesuit sites

== Literature ==
- Martin Scheins: Geschichte der Jesuitenkirche zum hl. Michael in Aachen: aus authentischen Quellen zusammengestellt, 1884
