= Burg-Reuland =

Municipality in the German-speaking Community of Belgium

- Municipality
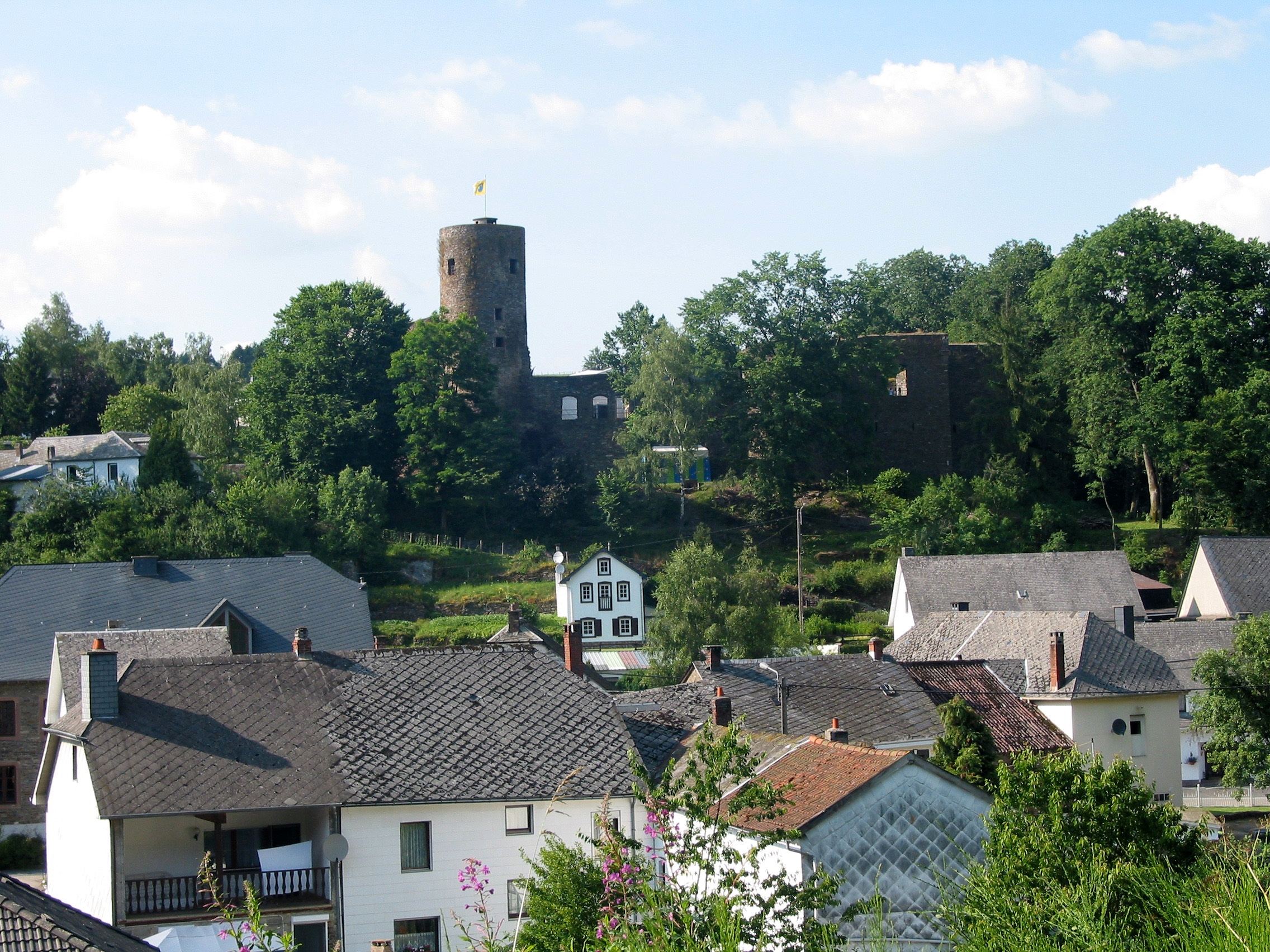

- Flag Coat of arms

- Location of Burg-Reuland in the province of Liège
- Interactive map of Burg-Reuland
- Location in Belgium
- Coordinates: 50°11′N 06°08′E
- Country: Belgium
- Community: German-speaking Community of Belgium
- Region: Wallonia
- Province: Liège
- Arrondissement: Verviers

Government
  - Mayor: Marion Dhur (CSP)
  - Governing party: cdH

Area
  - Total: 109.84 km^{2} (42.41 sq mi)

Population (2018-01-01)
  - Total: 3,956
  - Density: 36.02/km^{2} (93.28/sq mi)
- Postal codes: 4790-4791
- NIS code: 63087
- Area codes: 080
- Website: www.burg-reuland.be

Burg-Reuland (German pronunciation: [bʊʁk ˈʁɔʏlant]) is a municipality located in the Belgian province of Liège. The name of the municipality refers to the castle "Burg-Reuland", which is located in the center of the community. On January 1, 2006, Burg-Reuland had a total population of 3,903. The total area is 108.96 km^{2} which gives a population density of 36 inhabitants per km^{2}. Burg-Reuland is one of the municipalities of the German-speaking Community of Belgium.

The municipality consists of the following sub-municipalities: Reuland and Thommen.

The point where Belgium, Germany and Luxembourg meet is located on the river Our, near the village of Ouren in this municipality.

== Sports ==
Burg-Reuland has two main football clubs: SG Rapid Oudler of Oudler village (matricule number 7432), who play in the Liège Provincial Leagues, and Racing Club Burg-Reuland, who play in local amateur leagues not affiliated to the Royal Belgian Football Association.

== See also ==
- List of protected heritage sites in Burg-Reuland
- Reuland Castle
- Ouren Castle
- Haus von Orley
