= Bracht (surname) =

Bracht is a surname. Notable people with the surname include:

- Charles Bracht (1915–1978), Belgian alpine skier
- Erich Franz Eugen Bracht (1882–1969), German pathologist and gynaecologist
- Eugen Bracht (1842–1921), German landscape painter
- Frank Bracht (1910–1985), American film and music editor
- Franz Bracht (1877–1933), German jurist and politician
- Fritz Bracht (1899–1945), Nazi Gauleiter of Upper Silesia
- Helmut Bracht (1929–2011), German footballer
- Kai Bracht (born 1978), German ski jumper
- Timo Bracht (born 1975) German triathlete
- Travis Bracht, American singer and guitarist
- Uwe Bracht (1953–2016), German football player
