= Collaert =

Collaert, Colaert or Collaart may refer to:

- Hans Collaert a.k.a. Jan Collaert I (c. 1530–1580), a Flemish engraver
- His sons:
  - Adriaen Collaert (c.1560–1618), Flemish designer and engraver
  - Jan Collaert II (c. 1561–1620s), Flemish engraver and printmaker
- Jacques Colaert (?–1600), a Flemish privateer
- Jacob Collaert (floruit circa 1625–1635), a Flemish admiral who served as privateer and Dunkirker
- Jean Antoine de Collaert (1761–1816) led French cavalry for Napoleon and later Dutch-Belgian cavalry against Napoleon
