= Philips van Mallery =

Flemish engraver

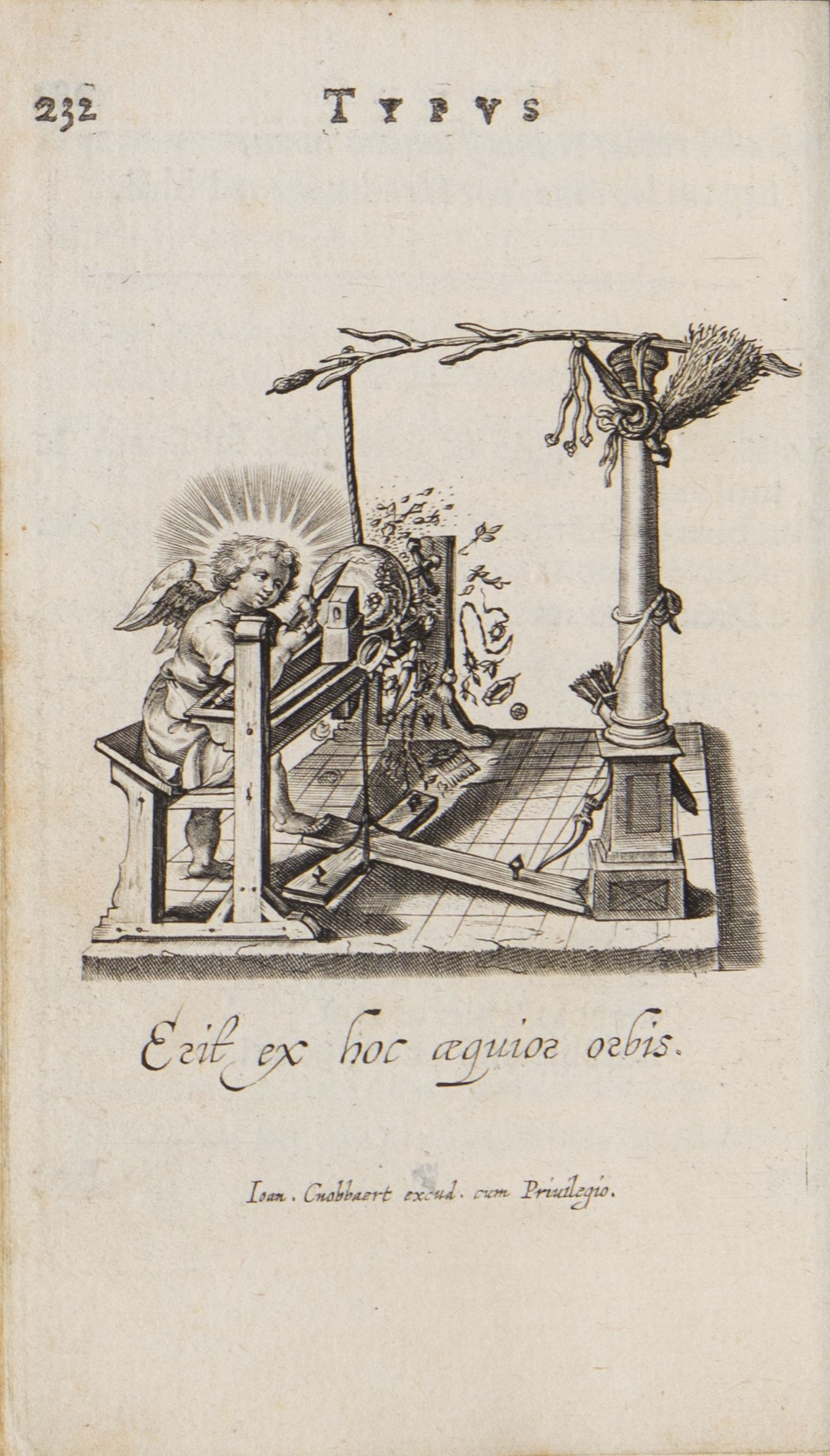
Erit ex hoc æquior Orbis, emblem from Typus mundi, 1627

Philips van Mallery or Philips de Mallery (Baptised on 6 January 1598, Antwerp –after 1634, Antwerp) was a Flemish engraver and publisher who mainly worked on religious subjects, devotional prints, reproductive prints and emblem books. He worked in Antwerp.

== Life ==
Philips van Mallery was born in Antwerp where he was baptized on 6 January 1598. He was the son of the Antwerp engraver Karel van Mallery and Catharina Galle, the daughter of prominent Antwerp engraver and publisher Philips Galle. He trained with his father. He was registered as a member of the Antwerp Guild of Saint Luke in 1626.

The date of his death is not known. It must have been after 1634, as Valerius was registered as his pupil in the Guild register in 1634. In the same year the death of his wife was also registered.

== Work ==
His work consists of Christian religious representations, devotional prints and emblems.

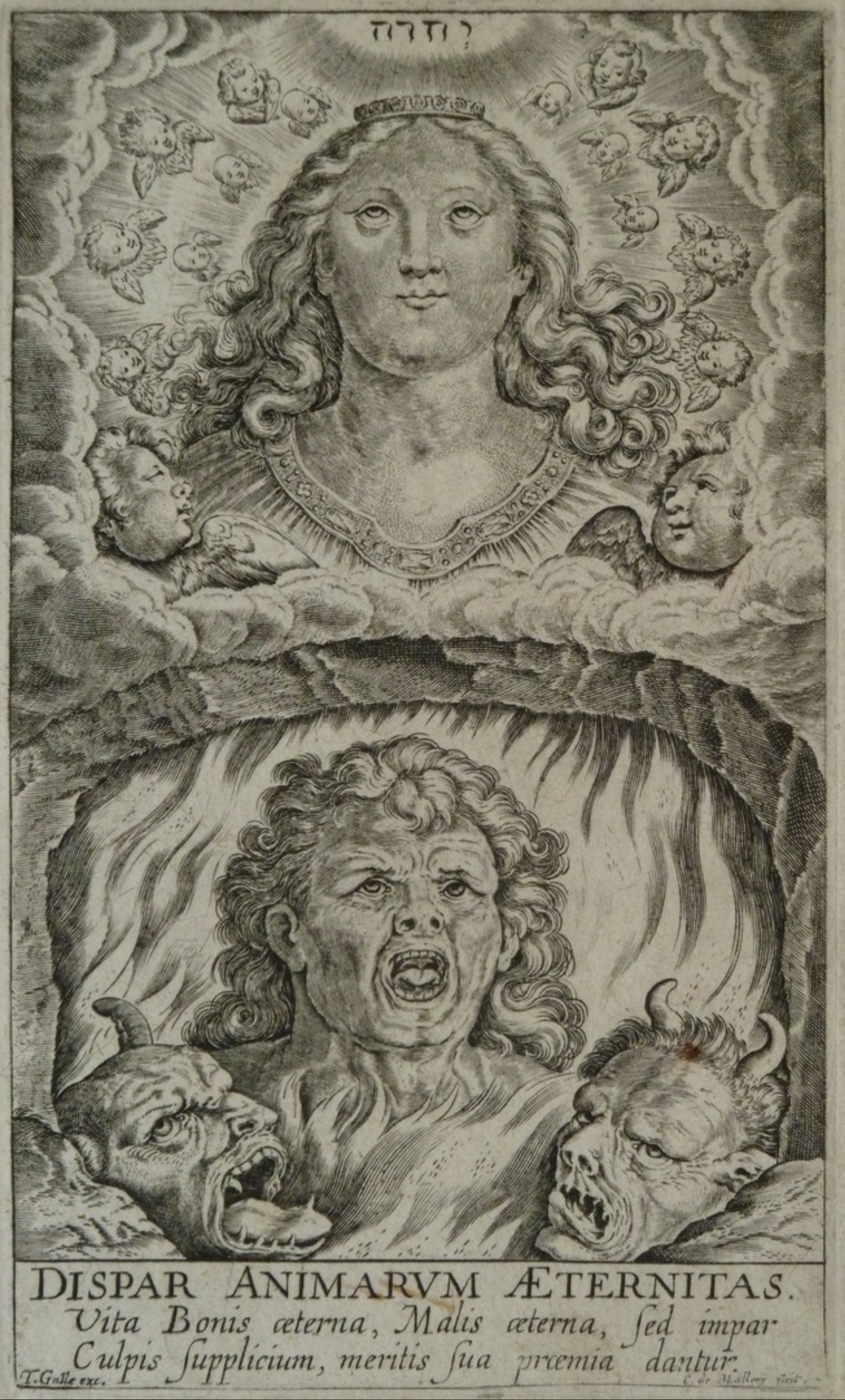
Representation of eternal inequality for the blessed and the damned

He made the emblems for an emblem book published by Joannes Cnobbaert in Antwerp in 1627 under the title Typus mundi in quo ejus calamitates et pericula nec non divini, humanique amoris antipathia, emblematice proponuntur (Image of the World, in which Calamities and Perils are emblematically presented along with the opposition in feeling between the Love of God and that of man). The Jesuit College of Antwerp was the creator of the book. The college's senior students of the class of Humanities, including Philip Fruytiers, created three or four emblems, including a long Latin poem and short poems in French and Dutch. The emblems represent examples of earthly versus divine love. The calamities and perils referred to in the title of the publication are pointed out in all kinds of objects representing human failures. For instance, swords and crowns reference the perils of human power. The emblems also represent human flaws such as pride and vanity. The emblems are sometimes odd and very humorous such as the one showing Cupid turning the globe at a lathe, using the cross as its pedal (Erit ex hoc æquior Orbis). The frontispiece of the publication shows a portrait of Ignatius Loyola, the founder of the Society of Jesus.

Philips van Mallery made the engravings for the publication Vita S. Rosaliae Virginis Panormitanae Pestis Patronæ iconibus expressa, published by Cornelis Galle the Elder in Antwerp in 1629. The engravings were made after drawings by Anthony van Dyck. Only a few copies of the work, which recounts the life of the Catholic Saint Rosalia of Palermo, survive.
