= Karel van Mallery =

Flemish engraver

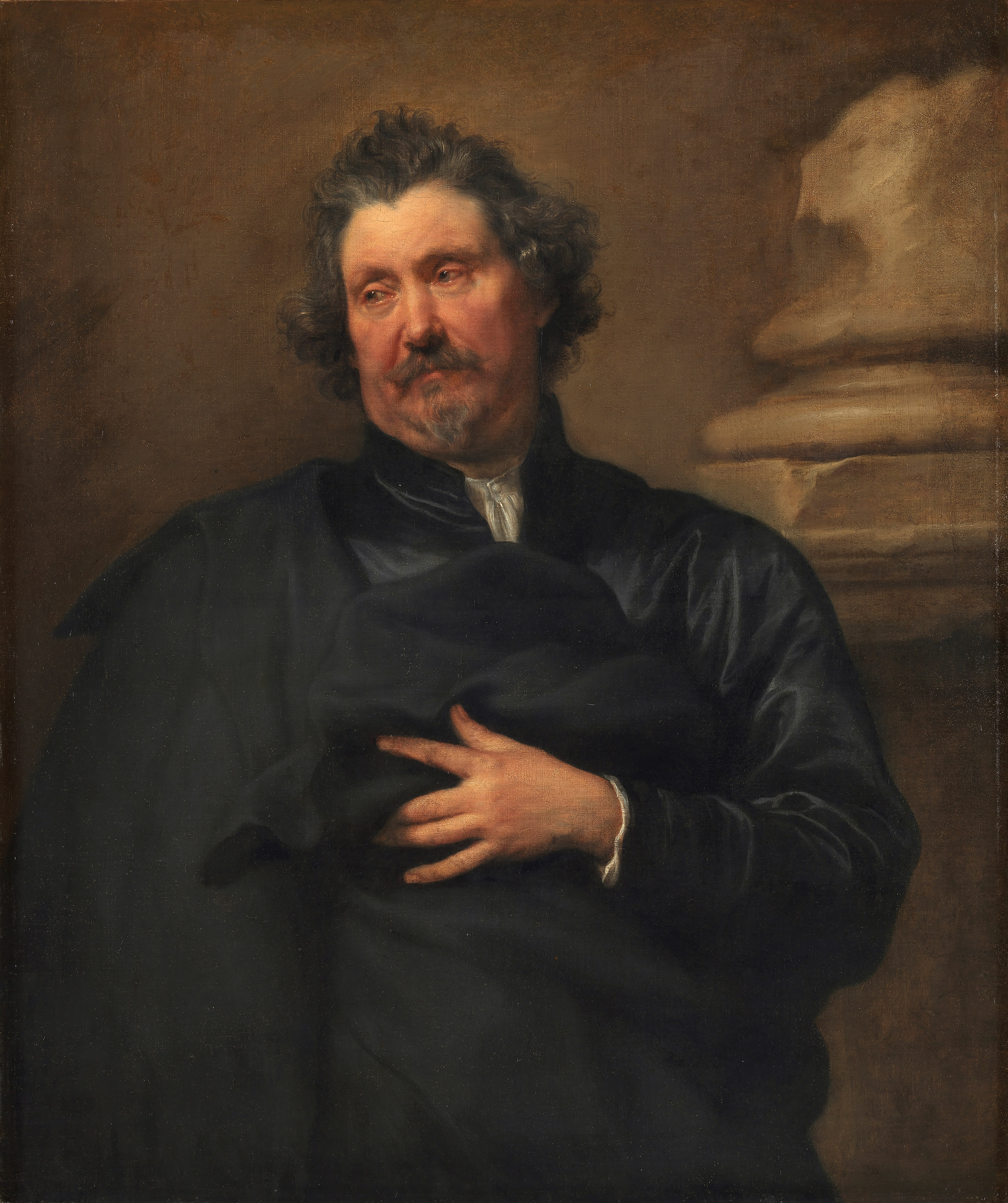
Karel van Mallery, by Anthony van Dyck

Karel van Mallery (1571–1635?) was a Flemish engraver who mainly worked on religious subjects and portraits and was also a reproductive engraver. He worked in Antwerp and Paris.

== Life ==
Karel van Mallery was born in Antwerp. He was a pupil of Philips Galle. He was registered as a pupil in the Antwerp Guild of Saint Luke in 1585.

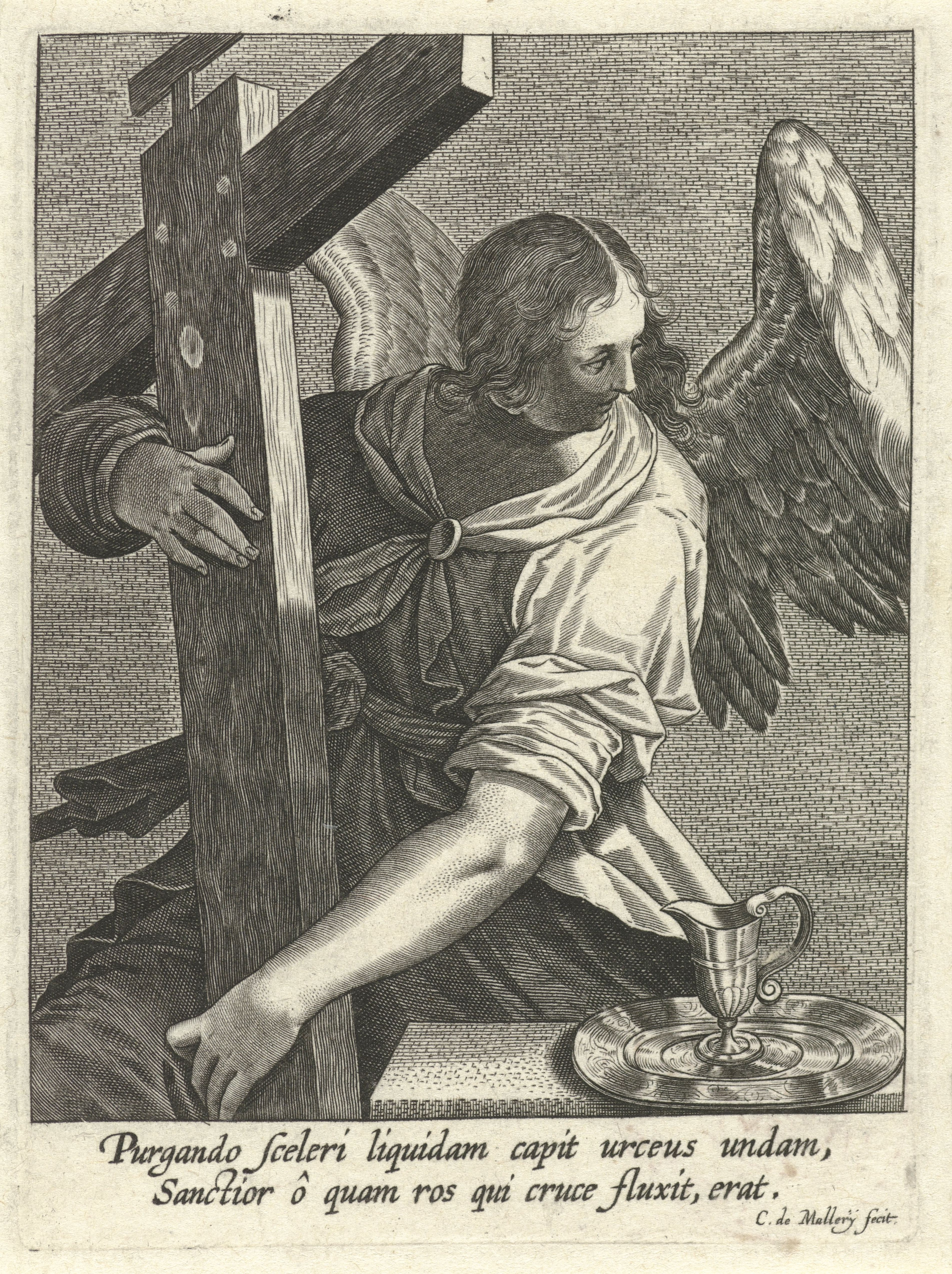
Angel with Cross and Wash Basin

He travelled to Rome in the years 1595-1597, and when he returned to Antwerp, he became a master in the Guild in 1597. He married Catharina Galle, the daughter of his teacher, on 10 January 1598. They named their son Philips.

From 1601 he worked in Antwerp and in Paris for a period of about five years. In 1620-1621 he became deacon of the Antwerp Guild and in 1626 he lived in the Keyserstraet. He was the teacher of his son Philips van Mallery and the engraver Michel Natalis.

The date and place of his death are not certain.

Anthony van Dyck painted his portrait, which was engraved by Lucas Vorsterman the Elder for inclusion in the Iconography of van Dyck.

== Work ==
His work consists of Christian religious representations, portraits, and reproductions of works of other artists.

He worked on various publishing projects for the Antwerp publishers, such as the Plantin Press and on religious commissions often in collaboration with other Antwerp engravers, such as Philip Galle and the Wierix brothers.
