= Antony van der Does =

Flemish engraver and print maker (1609–1680)

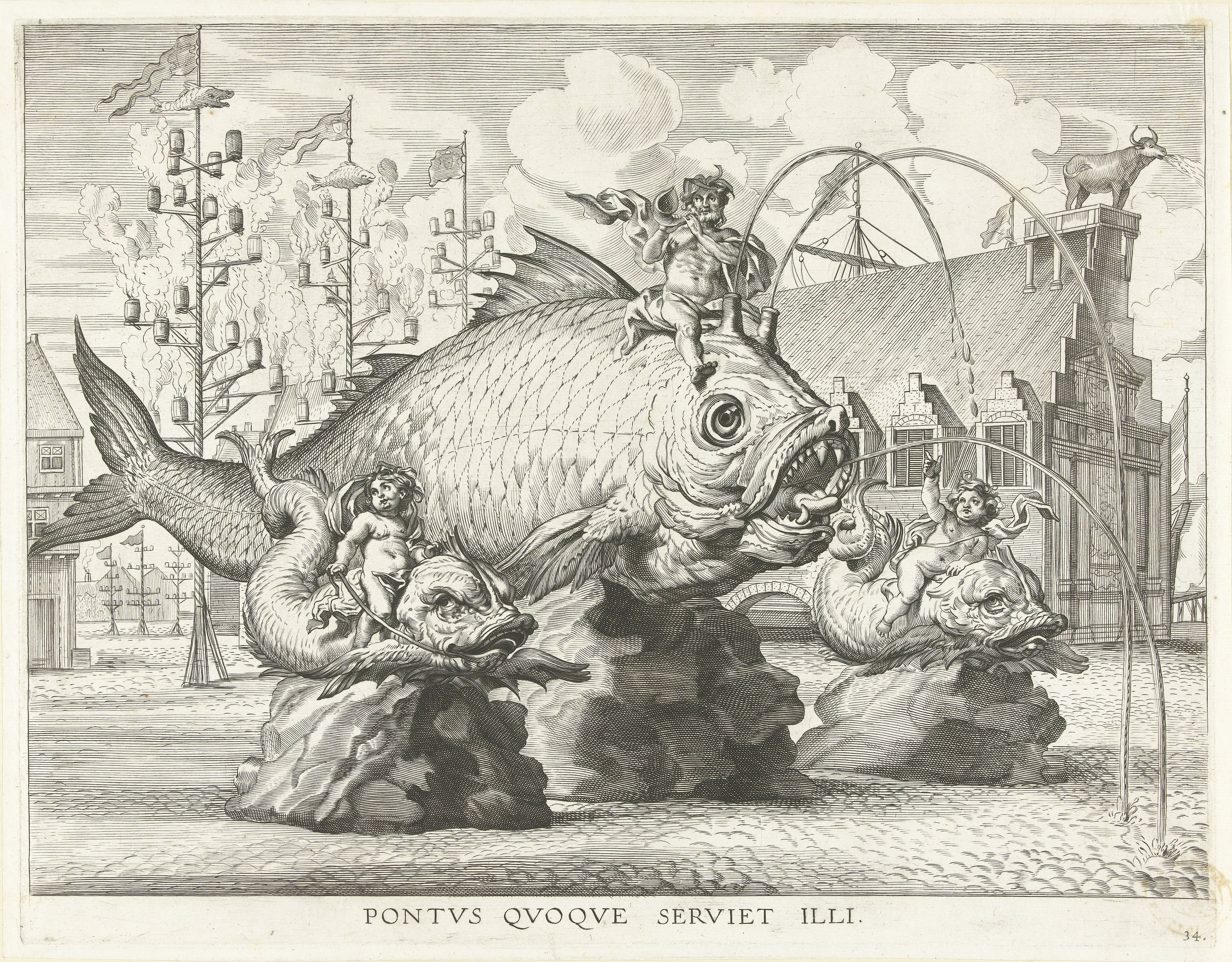
Spectacle with Ferdinand as Triton on a giant fish

Antoon van der Does or Antoni van der Does (1609 in Antwerp – 1680 in Antwerp) was a Flemish engraver and print maker who was active in Antwerp. He is mainly known as a reproductive artist.

== Life ==
Some 19th-century art historians believed that Antony van der Does was a native of The Hague in the Dutch Republic and was related to the van der Does family of painters. Antony was, however, born in Antwerp where he was baptized on 10 March 1609. There are no indications of a family link with the Dutch van der Does family. He was born in Antwerp as the son of Jan van der Does and Joanna van Orshagen and was baptized in Antwerp Cathedral on 10 March 1609.

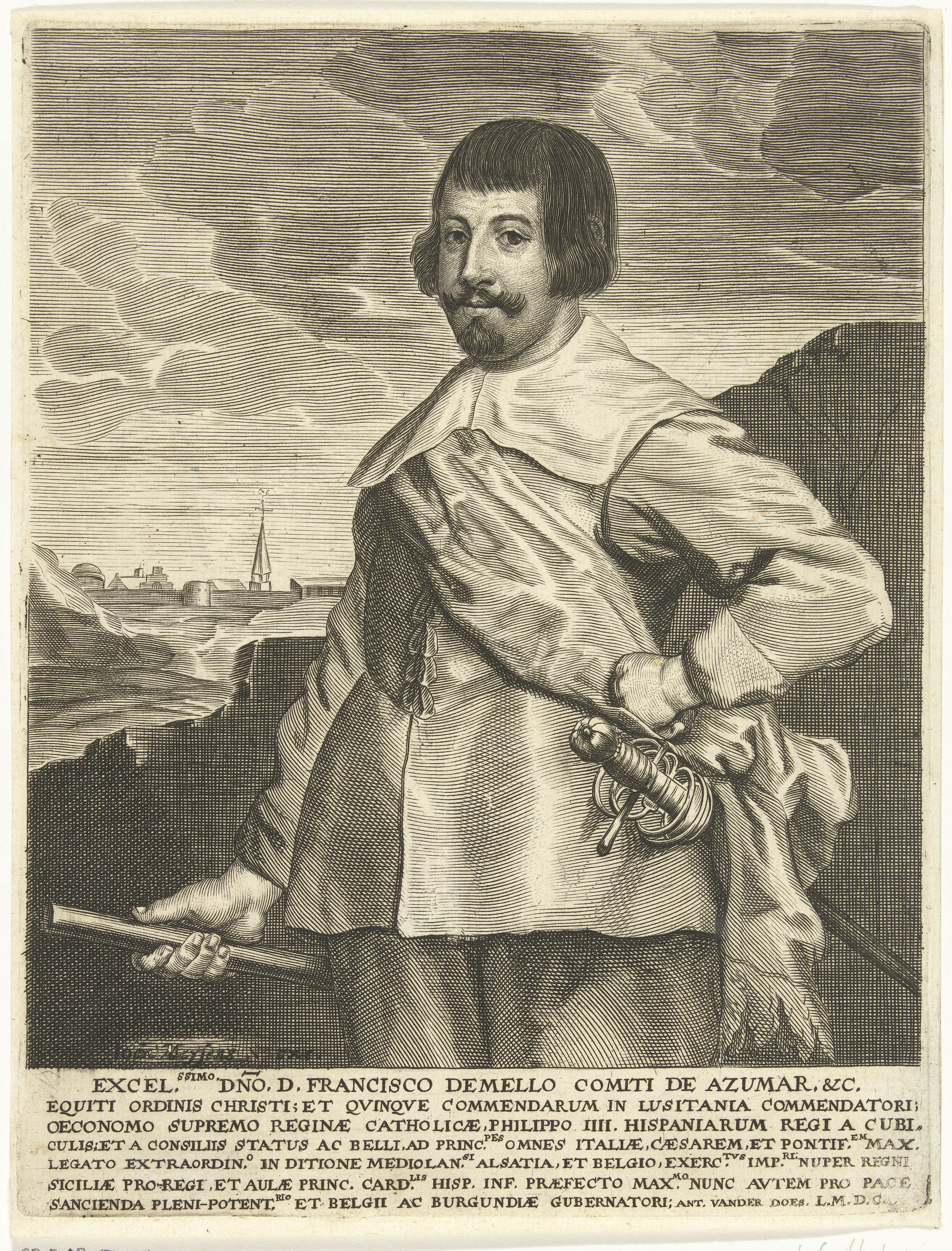
Portrait of Francisco de Melo

Antony van der Does commenced his study of engraving as a pupil of Jan Collaert II in 1627. In September 1630 he joined the Society of the Aged Bachelors (Sodaliteit der Bejaarde Jongmans), a fraternity for bachelors established by the Jesuit order. In 1633 he was admitted as a master in the Guild of Saint Luke of Antwerp. In 1634 he married Anna du Pont (or Pontius), the sister of Paulus Pontius, one of the leading engravers in Rubens’ studio.

== Work ==
He had a reputation for his engraved portraits. He sometimes used the monogram "AVD". His style is regarded as close to that of Paulus Pontius.

He engraved historical and mythological scenes after the work of the leading Antwerp painters of the time such as Rubens, Anthony van Dyck, Erasmus Quellinus II, Gaspar de Crayer and Abraham van Diepenbeek.

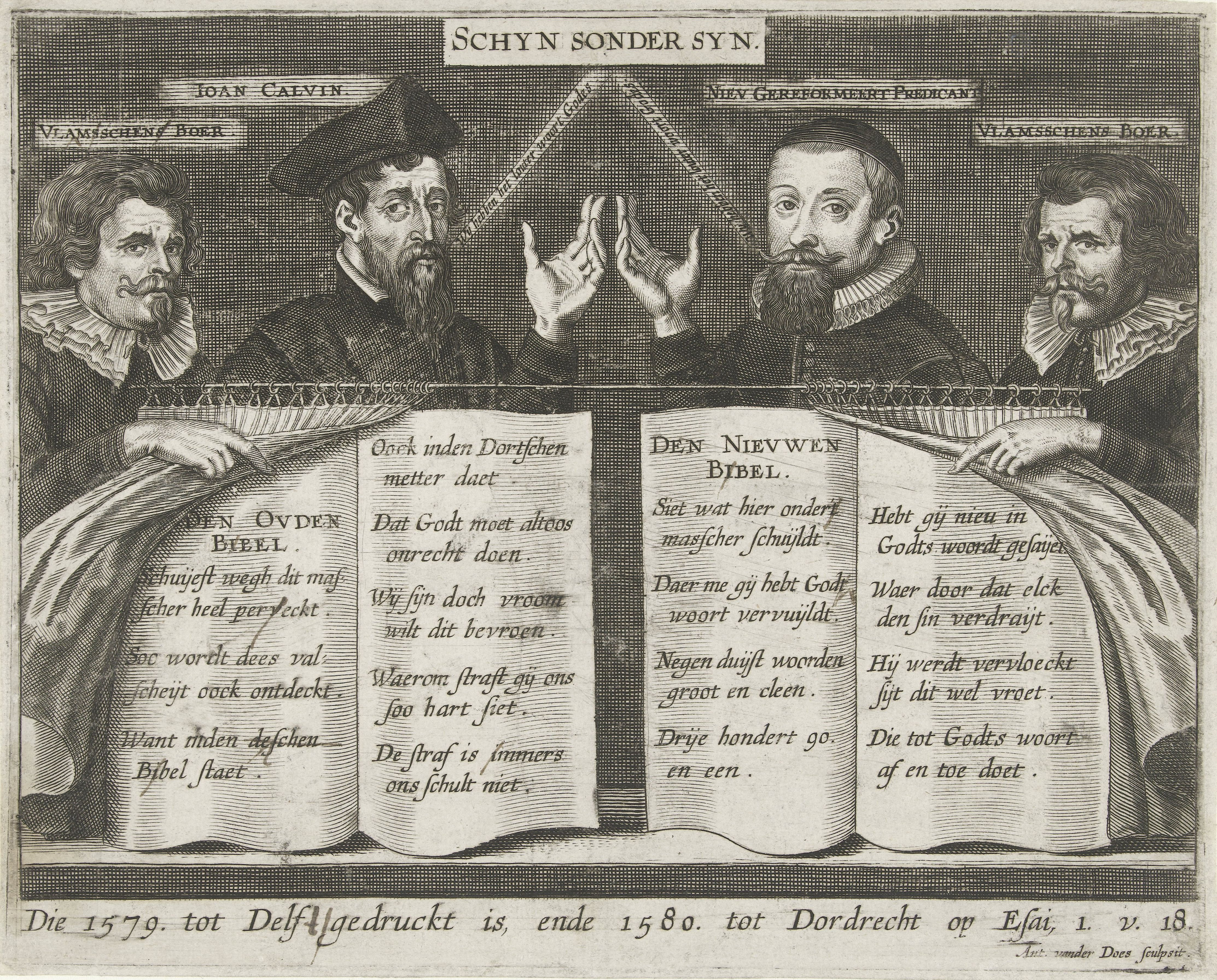
Satirical print on Protestant bible publications

He worked on various publication projects for leading publishers in the Southern Netherlands and the Dutch Republic. He was in 1642 in Brussels making some of the plates for the 'Portraits des hommes illustres du 17e siècle' (Portraits of famous people of the 17th century) a publication released in Amsterdam in 1649. Some of these plates have the date 1649.

He made for the publisher Joannes Meyssens various portraits for his publication projects. He was, for instance, responsible for the engraving of the portraits of the painter Leonaert Bramer and the engraver Jacob Matham in Het Gulden Cabinet, a publication of Meyssens authored by Cornelis de Bie.

He made around 1650 a print satirizing the publication of different bible editions by the Dutch Calvinist Albrecht Hendriksen in Delft in 1579 and the Dutch New Reformed Church minister J. Canin in Dordrecht in 1580. The print was used by the Flemish Catholic polemicist Aernout van Geluwe in his book the Vlaemschen boer (Flemish Peasant) published in Antwerp in 1652. The print shows Aernout of Gheluwe pulling a curtain on the left revealing the Old Bible of John Calvin and another on the right revealing the New Bible of the New Reformed preacher.
