= Jan Collaert the Elder =

Flemish printmaker, publisher and designer (1525/30–1580)

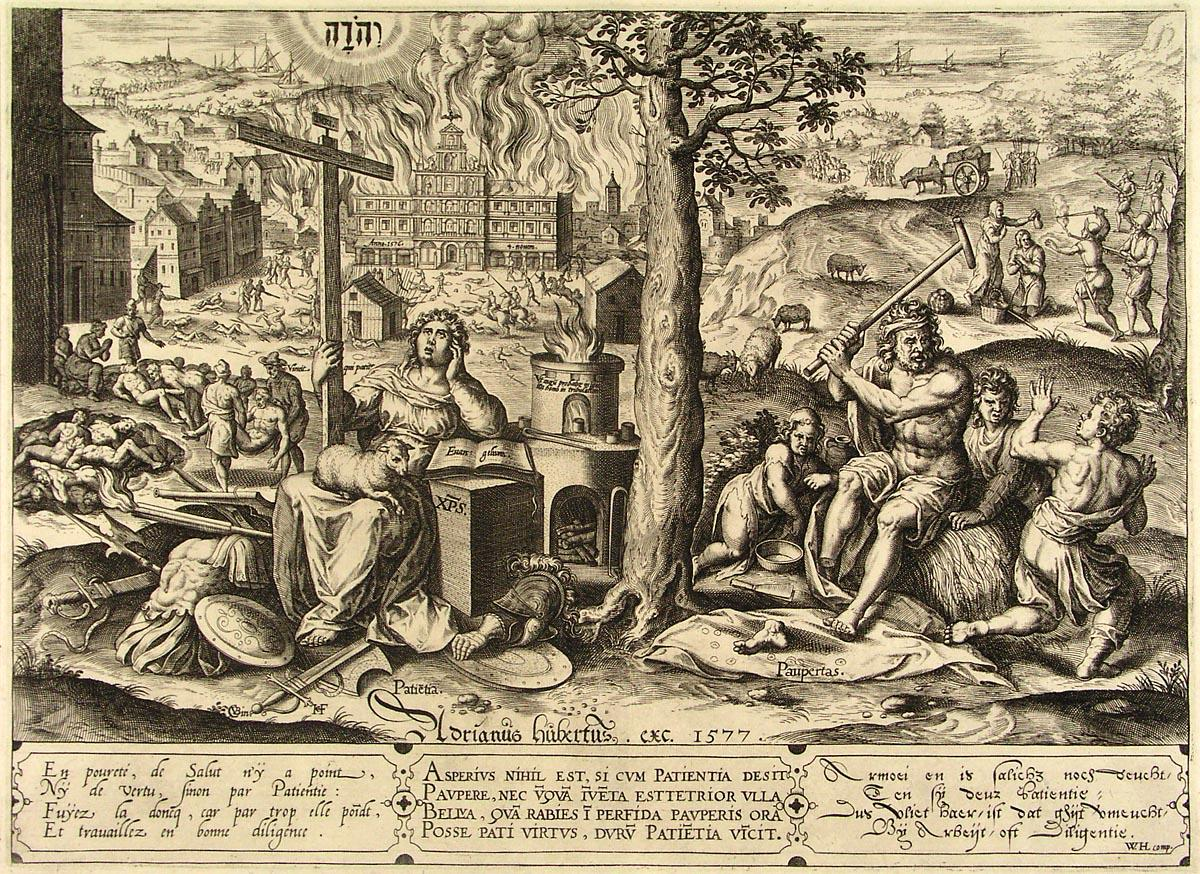
The Spanish Fury, after Chrispijn van den Broeck

Jan Collaert the Elder or (I), Hans Collaert the Elder or Johannes Collaert (Brussels, between 1525 and 1530 – Antwerp, October 1580) was a Flemish printmaker, publisher, draftsman, tapestry designer, glass painter and designer and engraver of swords. He was the founder of a dynasty of engravers that would play a significant role in establishing Antwerp as one of the leading centres for printmaking in Europe in the second half of the 16th century and the early 17th century.

== Life ==
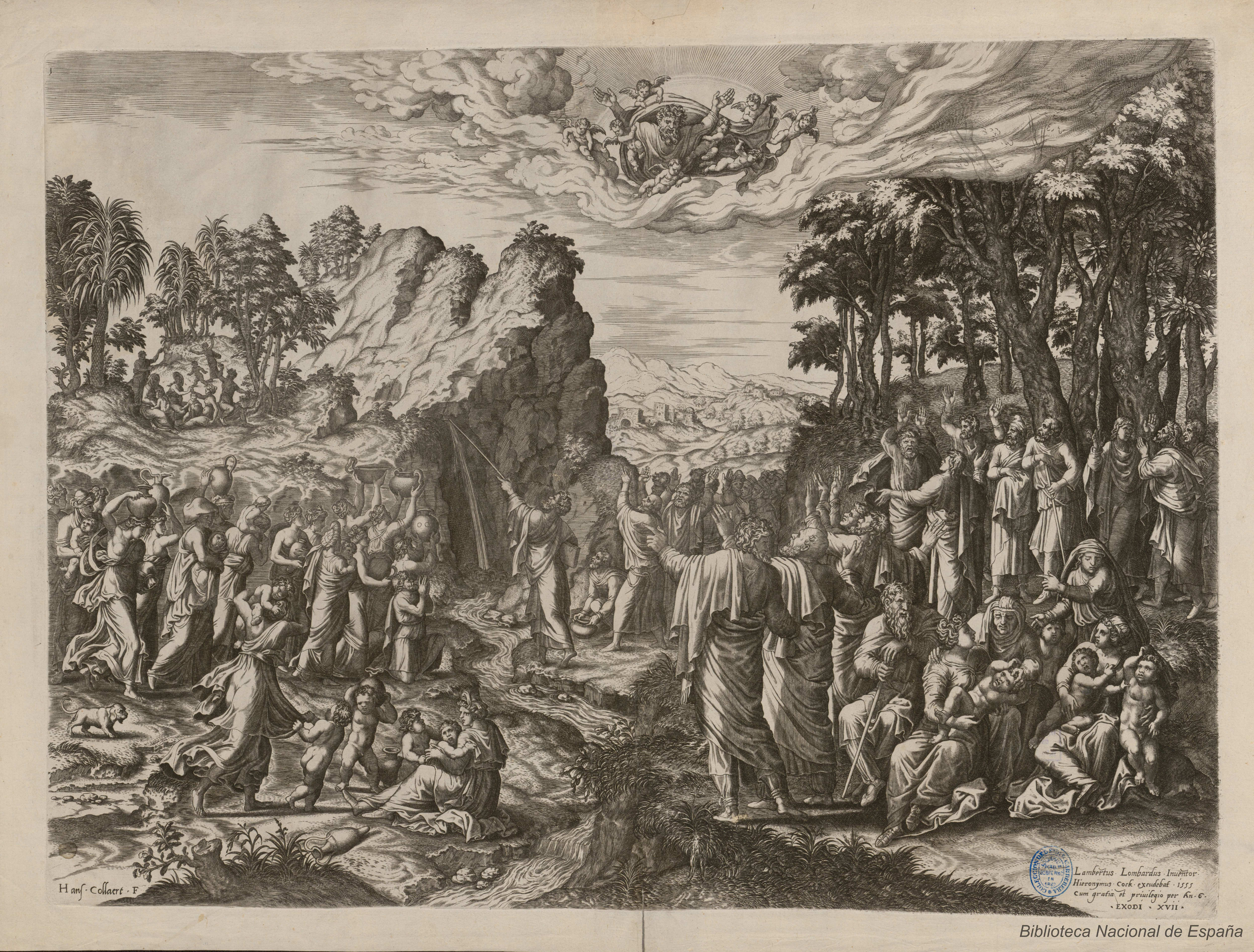
Moses striking the rock, after Lambert Lombard

Jan Collaert the Elder was born in Brussels as the son of Jannen (Jan) Collaert. His father was a designer and painter of cartoons for tapestries. Jan likely trained with his father. After a career as a draftsman producing designs for glass makers, tapestry makers and embroiderers in Brussels, he moved sometime before 1563 to Antwerp where he created designs for the local tapestry workshops. He also provided designs for jewelry.

His first dated print was published by Hieronymous Cock (1518–1570) in 1555. Collaert engraved plates to the designs by other artists for several print publishers in Antwerp during the 1570s. He married Anna van der Heyden, with whom he had four children: Adriaen (c. 1555/65 – 1618)., Hansken (Jan or Hans) (1561 – 1620/1628), Tanneken and Susanna.

The sons would later work in the workshop of Philip Galle and marry Galle's daughters. The workshops of the Collaert and Galle families were close together and their works are hard to distinguish.

He died in Antwerp in October 1580.

== Work ==
Collaert was known for his engravings after designs by contemporary artists, usually from the Northern Renaissance.

Collaert engraved a sword that was formerly in the collection formed in the nineteenth century by Prince Charles of Prussia and is now in the collection of the Deutsches Historisches Museum in Berlin. The sword blade was made by Damiano de Nerve between 1540 and 1581 and etched by Collaert after his own design. The signature IAN . COLLART appears in one of the figures engraved on the blade. The blade is etched with representations of the Planets on one side and Virtues on the other. The figures are in a vertical row.

== Selected works ==
He left many works including:

- Life of Saint Francis, 16 prints
- Views of Brussels and its surroundings, after Hans Bol and Jacob Grimmer, 24 prints, published before 1580
- Last Judgment, folio
- Monilium, Bullarum, Inauriumque Artificiosissimae Icones, 10 prints, 1581
- The Dead Christ in his Mother's Lap
- Marcus Curtius
- Moses Striking the Rock, and The Resurrection of Lazarus, after Lambert Lombard
- The Fathers of the Desert
- Biblia Sacra and the History of the Church, after Rubens.
