= Philip Galle =

Dutch engraver and publisher (1537–1612)

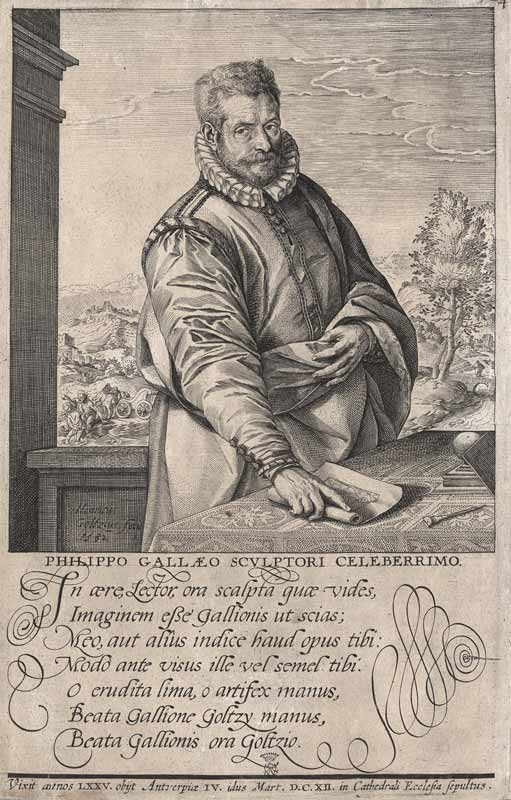
Portrait by his pupil Hendrick Goltzius, 1577

Philip (or Philips) Galle (1537 – March 1612) was a Dutch publisher, best known for publishing old master prints, which he also produced as designer and engraver. He is especially known for his reproductive engravings of paintings.

== Life ==
Galle was born in Haarlem in the Spanish Netherlands. He was a pupil of the humanist and engraver Dirck Volkertsz. Coornhert. He married Catharina van Rollant on 9 June 1569. They had three sons who later became artists: Theodoor, Cornelis, Philips II and two daughters who married engravers: Justa married the engraver Adriaen Collaert and Catharina married the engraver Karel de Mallery.

In Haarlem he engraved several works of the Haarlem painter Maarten van Heemskerck. While working for the Antwerp publisher Hieronymus Cock from 1557, he established himself at the same time as an independent printer in Haarlem in 1563, where he made prints after designs by the Flemish artists Johannes Stradanus and Maerten de Vos. In 1569 he published in Haarlem a series of engravings representing the Counts of Holland and Zeeland with Willem Thibaut. He moved to Antwerp somewhere near the end of 1569 or the start of 1570, probably to escape the Siege of Haarlem.

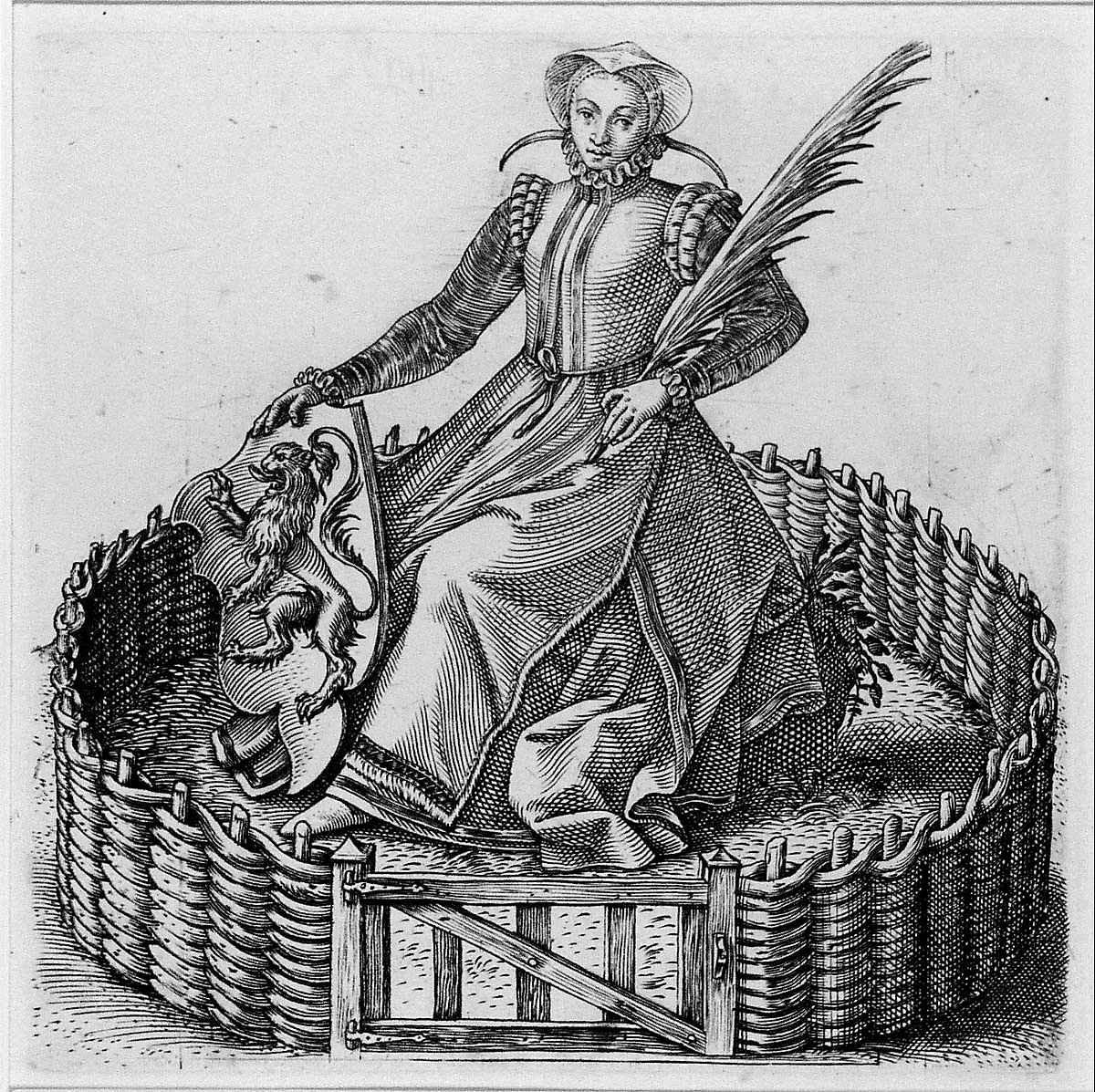
Garden of Holland, allegorical engraving by Galle of a woman dressed in the manner of Kenau Simonsdochter Hasselaer

His first house in Antwerp was most probably a house called Het Gulden Hert (The Golden Deer), opposite the house of the mapmaker Ortels (also known as Ortelius). He managed Cock's press and succeeded Cock in 1570 and was received as a citizen of Antwerp the following year. The work contains an approbatio, or permission from the ecclesiastical (Roman Catholic) authorities to publish. Galle had a difficult relationship with religion and political power during his entire life. He was a friend of the Antwerp printer Christopher Plantin and perhaps part of the secretive humanist circle of the Familia Caritatis (Family of Love), which makes it difficult to place him as Catholic or Protestant during the Dutch Revolt.

Some of his numerous prints made in Antwerp were after Anthonie van Blocklandt, Hans Bol, Marcus Gheeraerts, Gerard Groening, and Hans Vredeman de Vries.

Philip Galle's press and publishing house was a success. His pupils included his children, Hendrick Goltzius, Jan Baptist Barbé, the sons of his colleague Hans Collaert Adriaen and Jan, and Karel van Mallery. Henrick van Dort was his pupil from 1573. A likely apprentice was Pieter Nagel, an engraver who worked in Antwerp in the years 1569 to 1584. The map engraver Cornelis de Hooghe (or Hogius) received his education when Galle still lived in Haarlem. De Hooghe already worked for himself at the time Galle moved to Antwerp. De Hooghe later died a gruesome death in the Hague by beheading and quartering after a conviction for alleged conspiracy against the state.

== Writings ==
As a resident of Antwerp, Galle witnessed numerous events of the Eighty Years War, notably the siege and looting of the town in 1576 by the Spaniards, called "The Spanish Fury". Galle wrote a Cort Verhael, a short chronicle of these events, which was published around the end of 1578. This booklet, which included several maps, was dedicated to archduke Matthias of Austria, a relative of the legal king Philip II of Spain, but not recognised by him as a landvoogd or supervisor of the country. A later print was dedicated to Jean de Bourgogne, lord of Froidmont or Fromont. This rather personal book, which was translated in several languages soon after its first publication, shows Galle as a peace-loving person who intended to stay far away from the political and military turmoil of his era.

== Death ==
He died in Antwerp in March 1612. His sons and sons-in-law carried on the business in Antwerp through the seventeenth century. Galle's son Cornelis' early engravings show a striking similarity to the work of his father.

== Gallery ==
Pictures from the Theatri Orbis Terrarum Enchiridion 1585

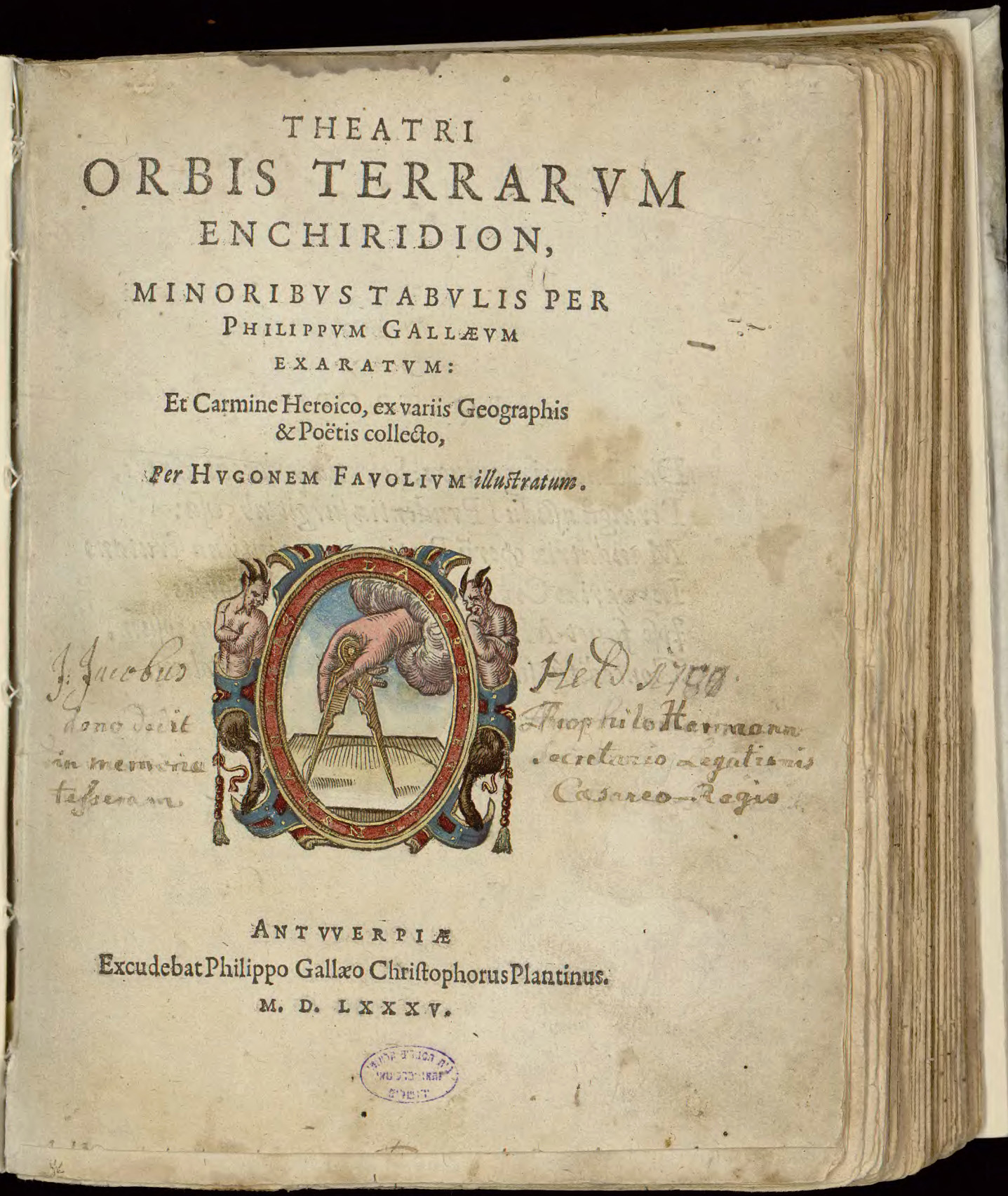
Titlepage

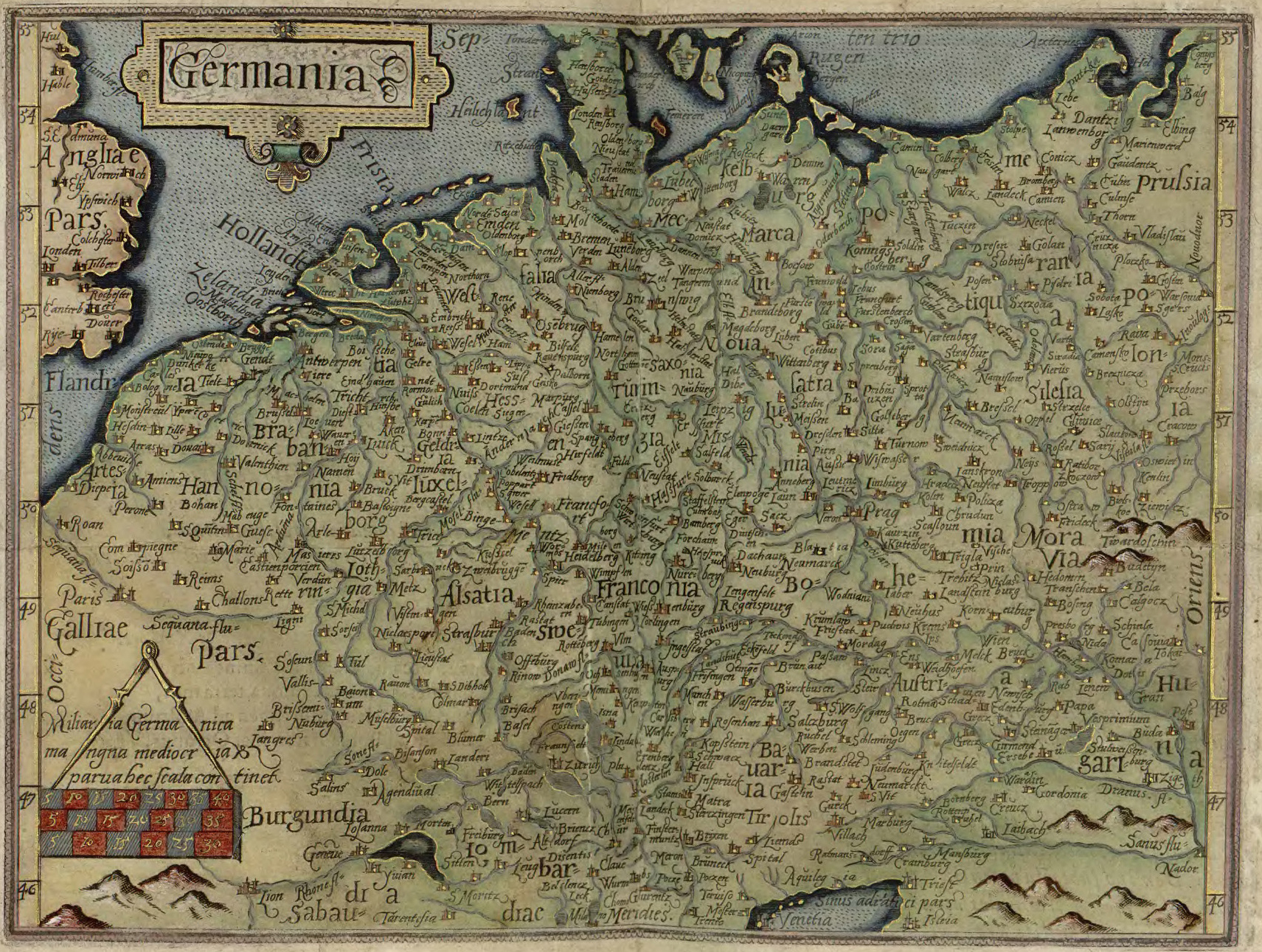
Germania

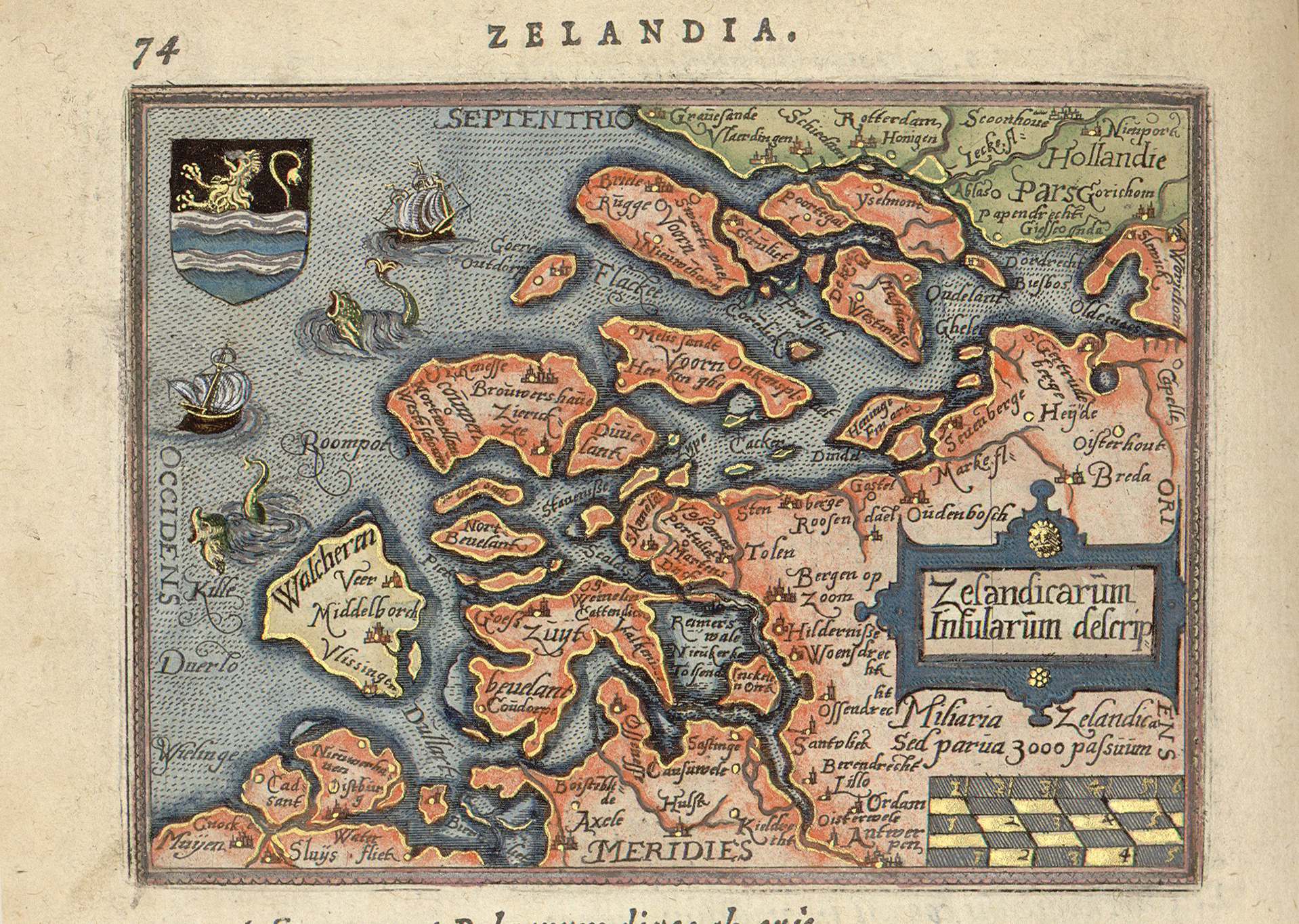
Zelandicarum

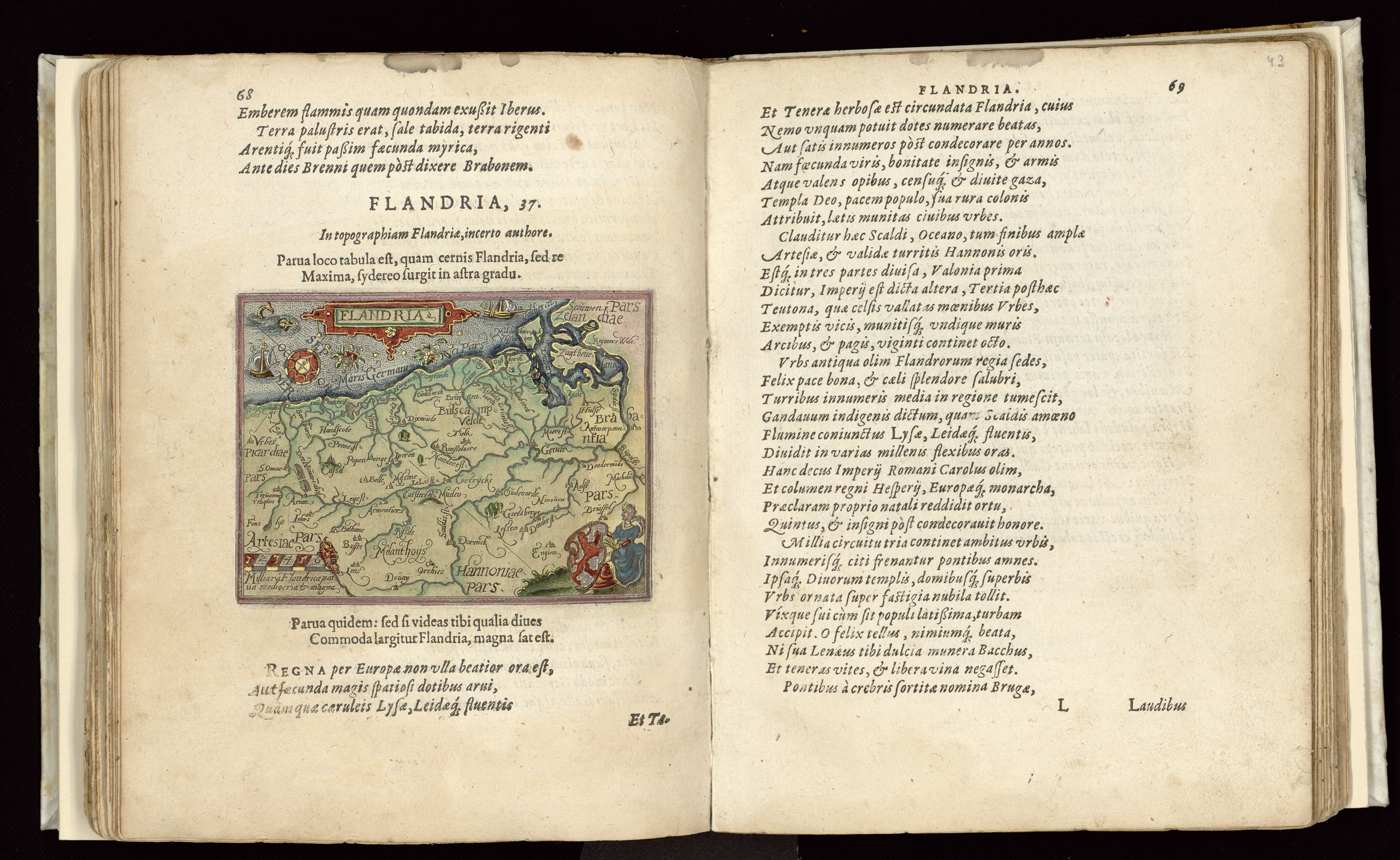
Flandria + text

Engravings attributed to Galle

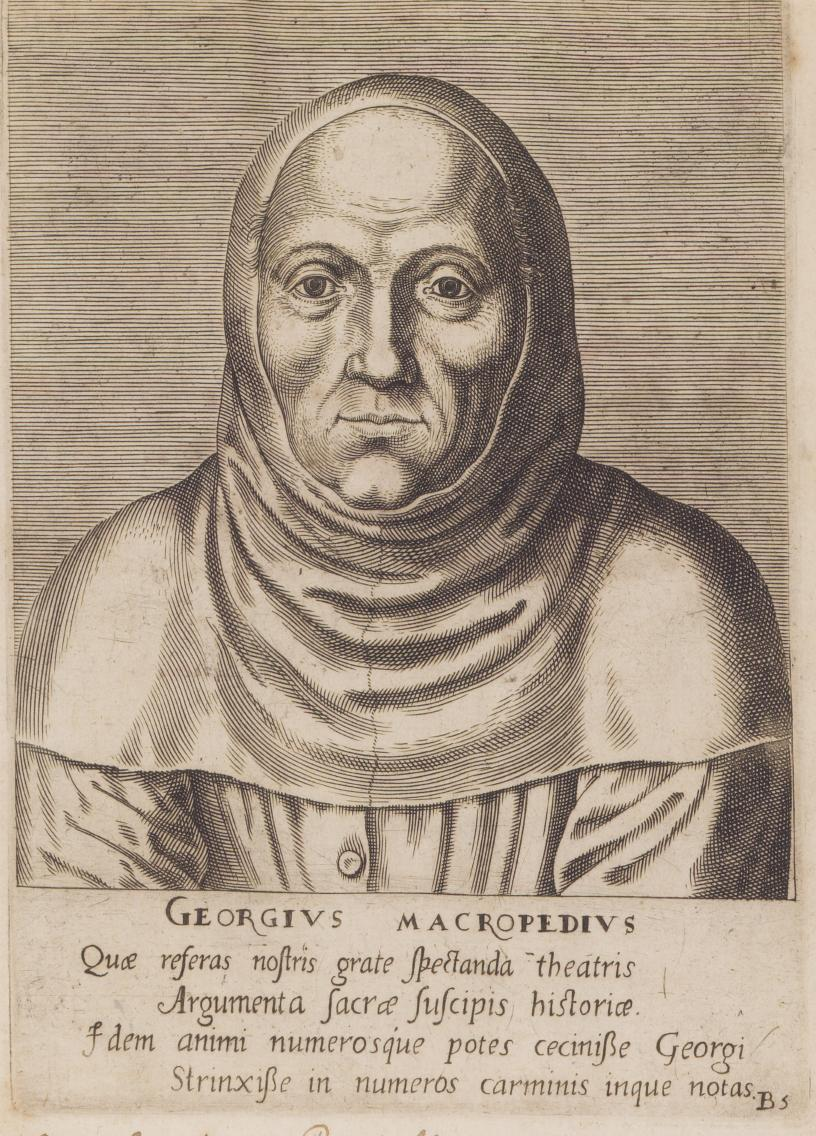
Macropedius

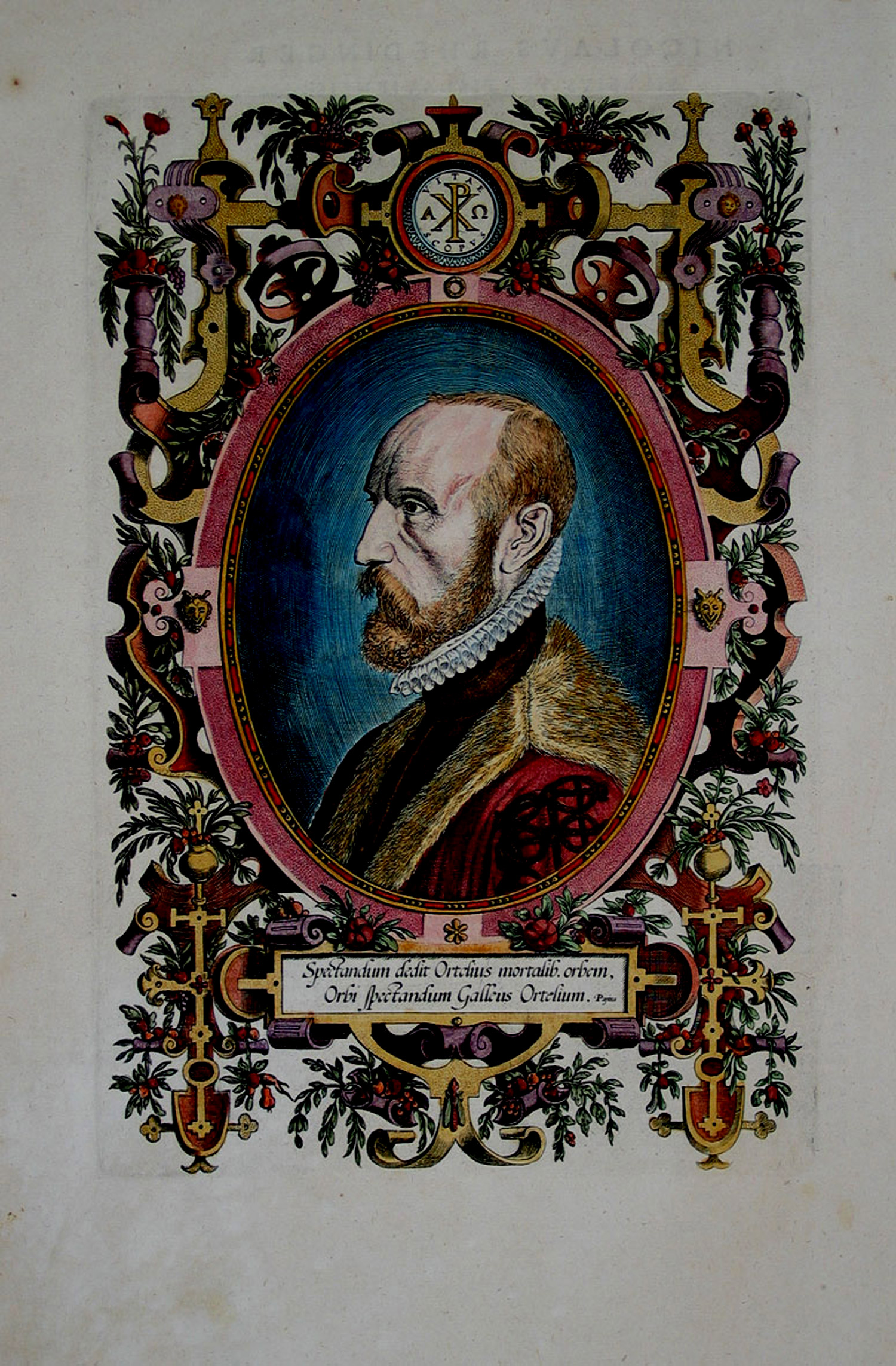
Ortelius

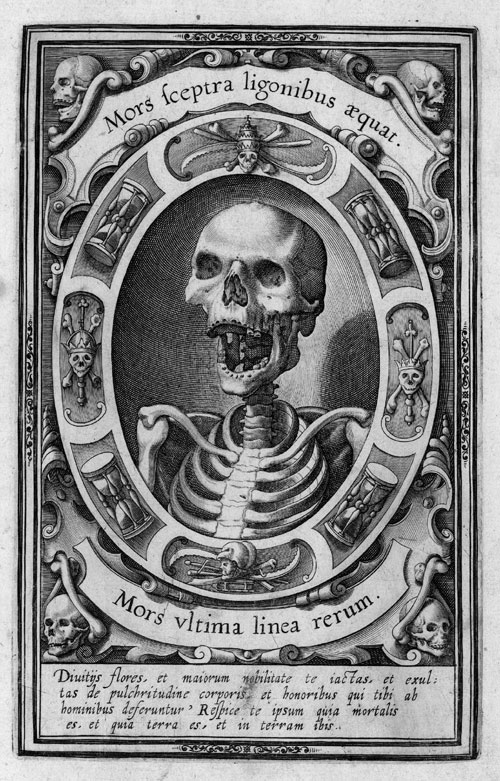
Death is the ultimate limit

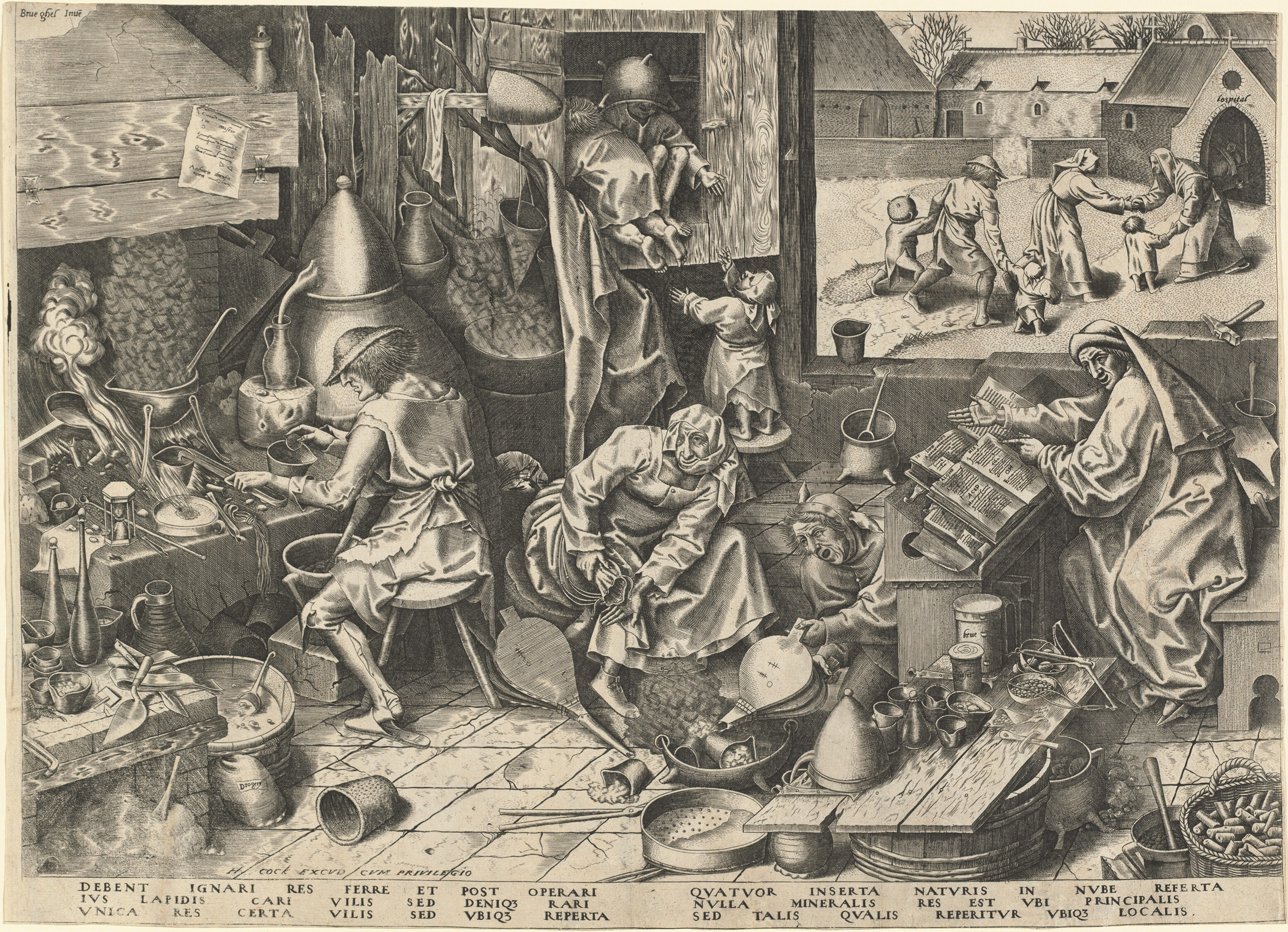
The Alchemist; after Breugel

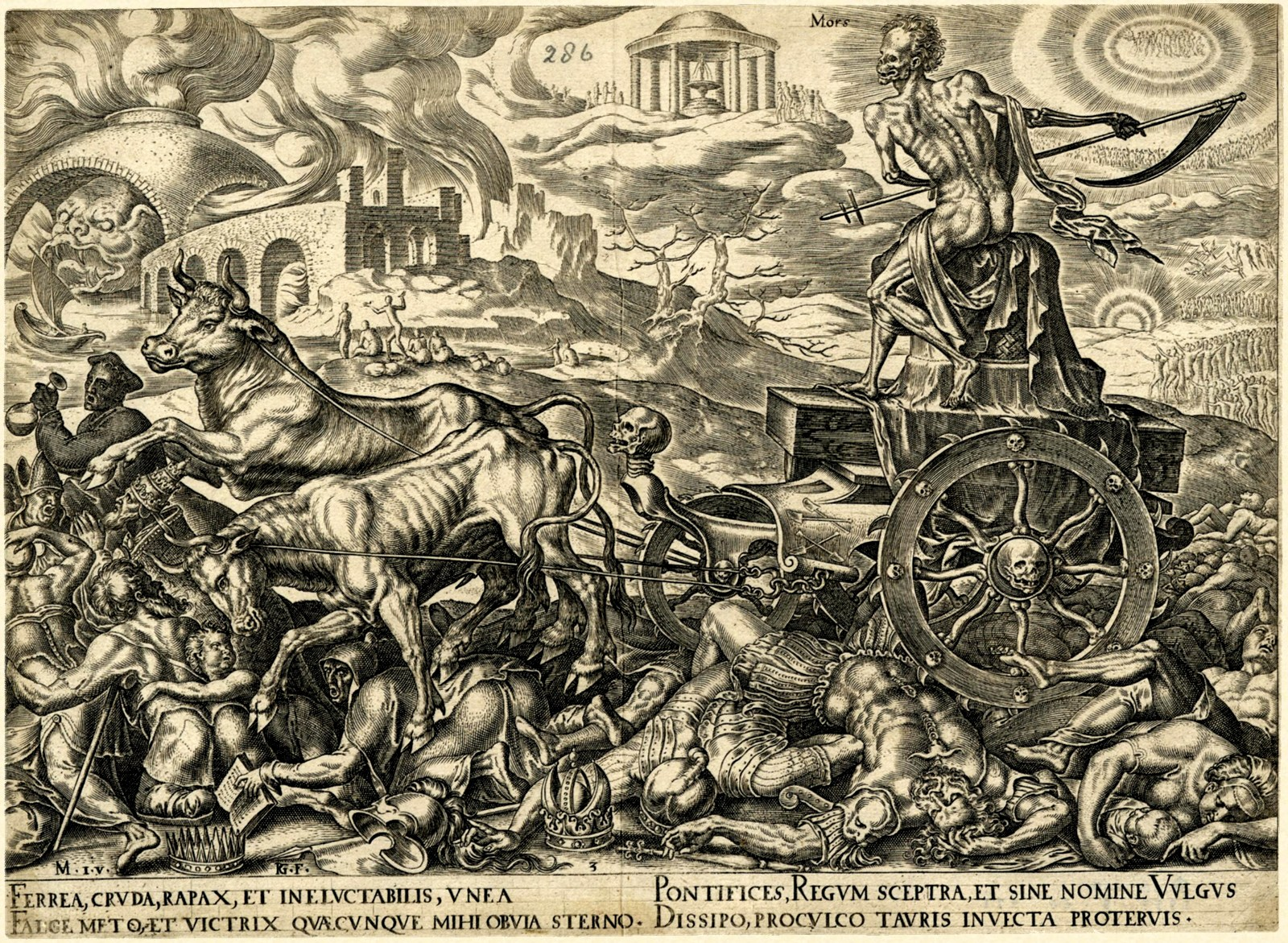
Triumph of Death

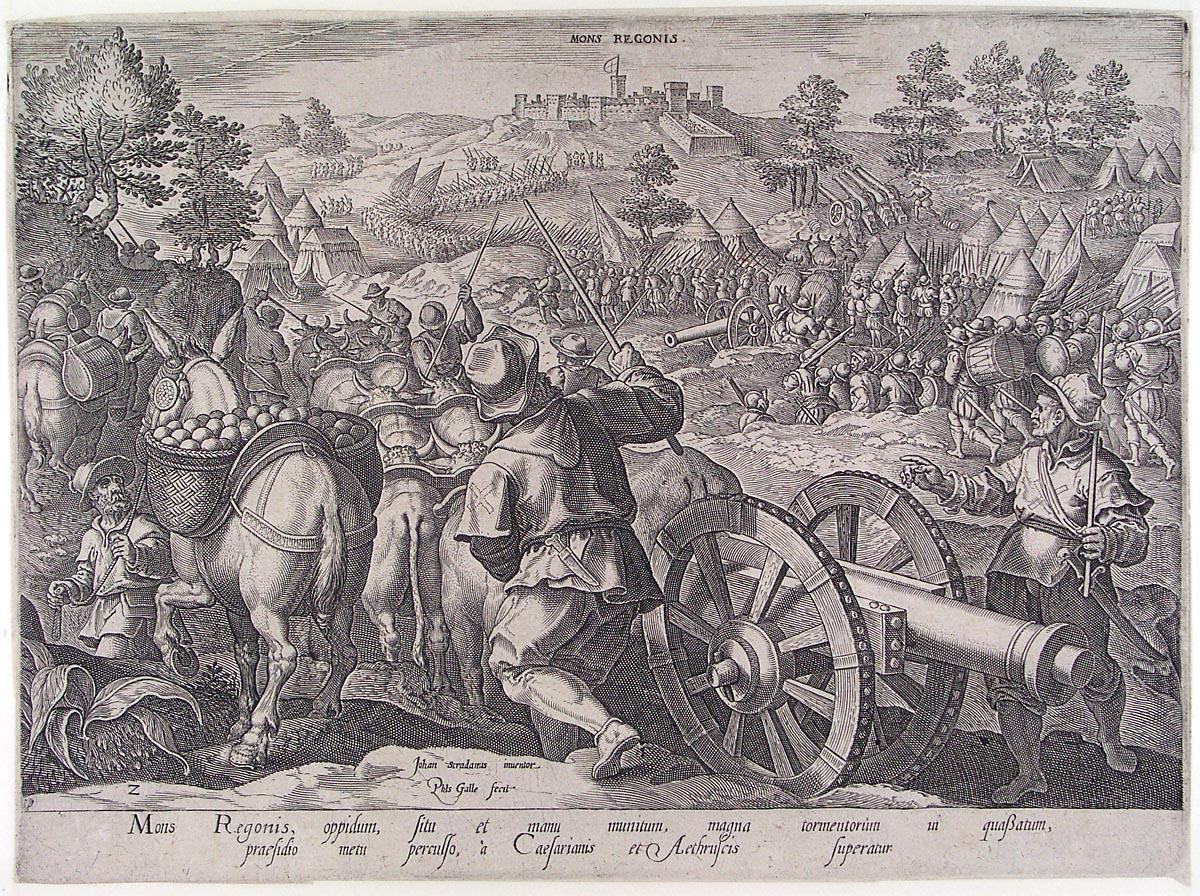
Battle at Mons Regonis

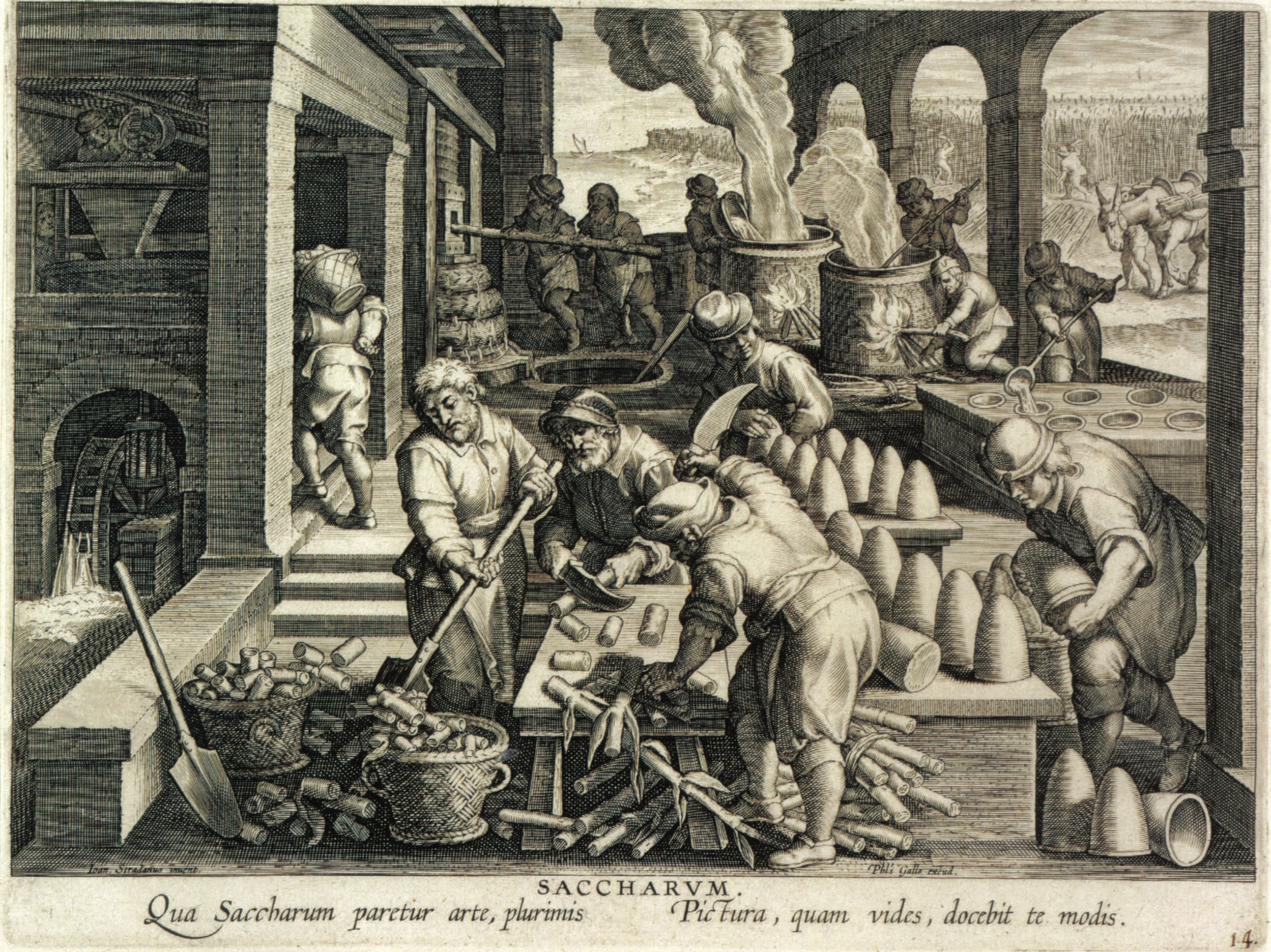
Sugarmill

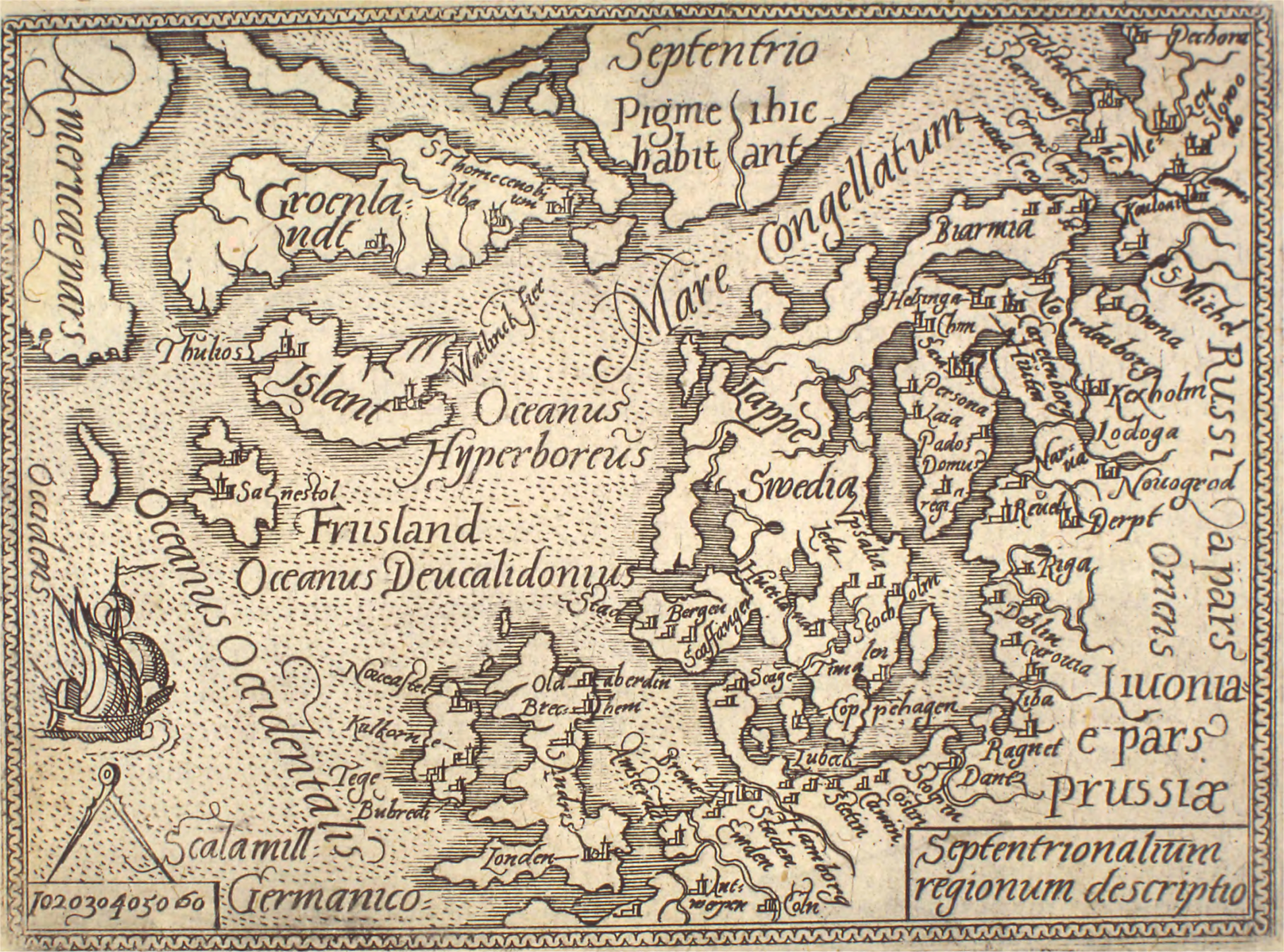
Northern Europe 1577

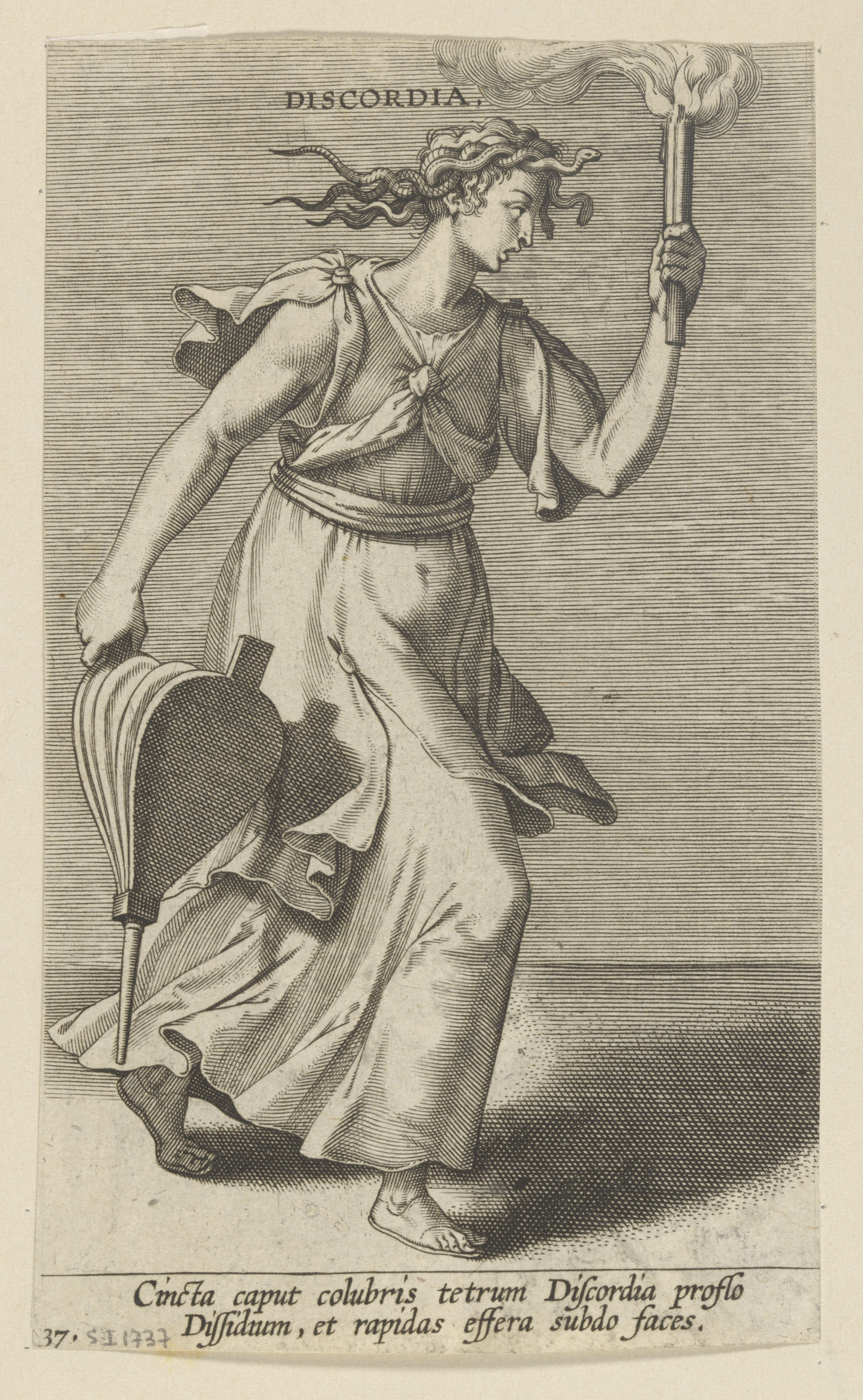
Discordia.

The Seven Sacraments (1576) with Hans Bol

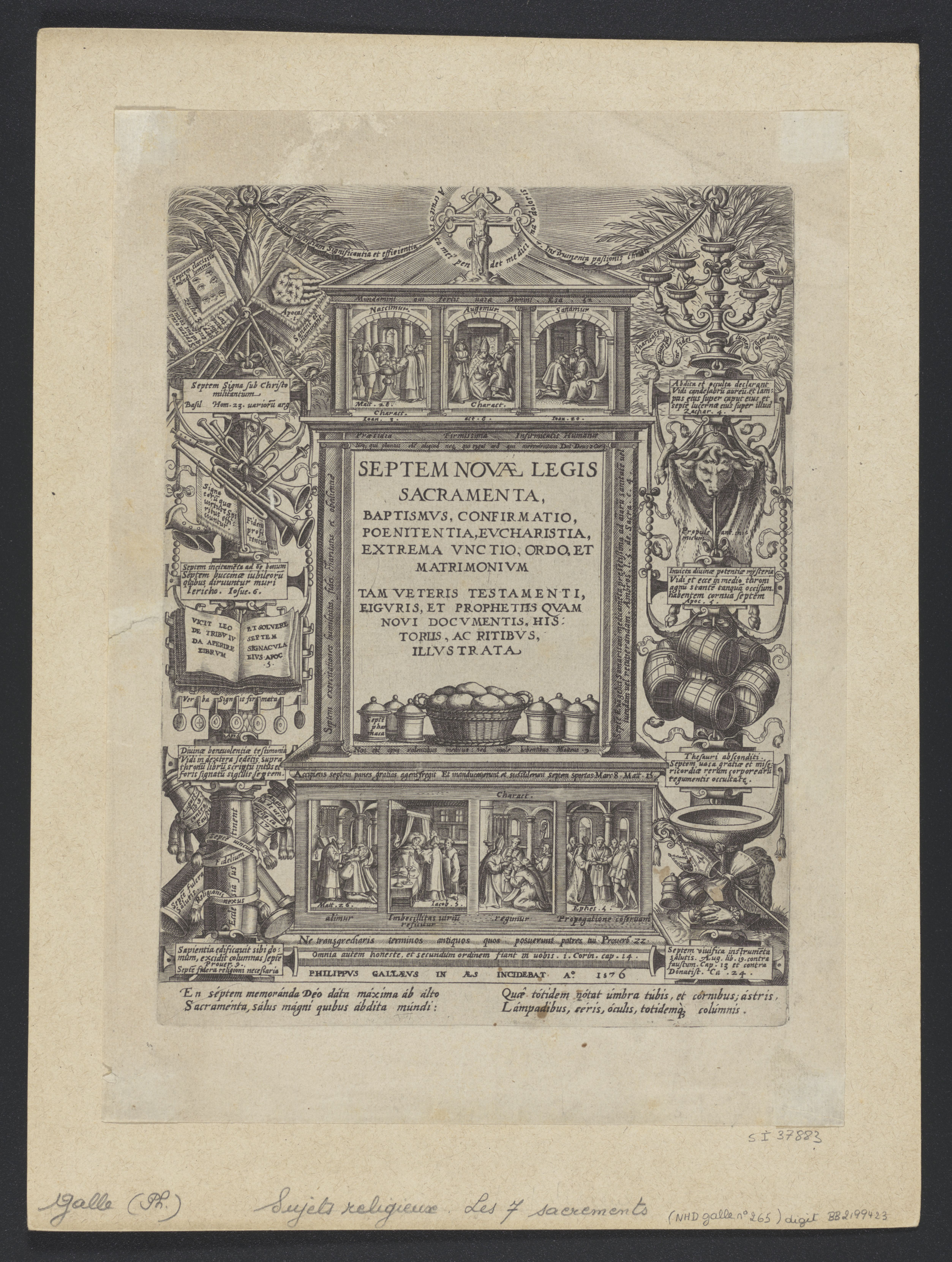
Titlepage

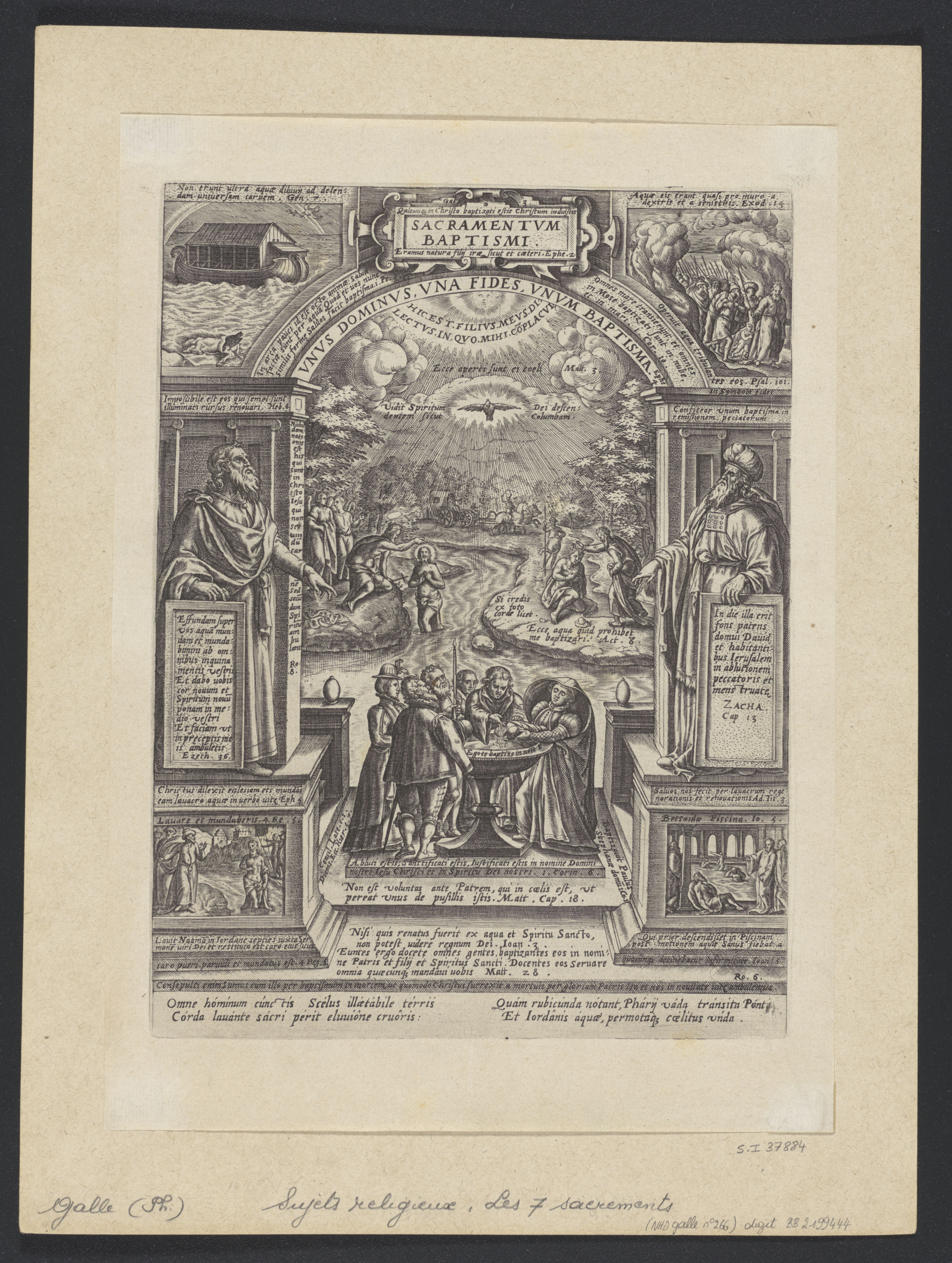
Baptism

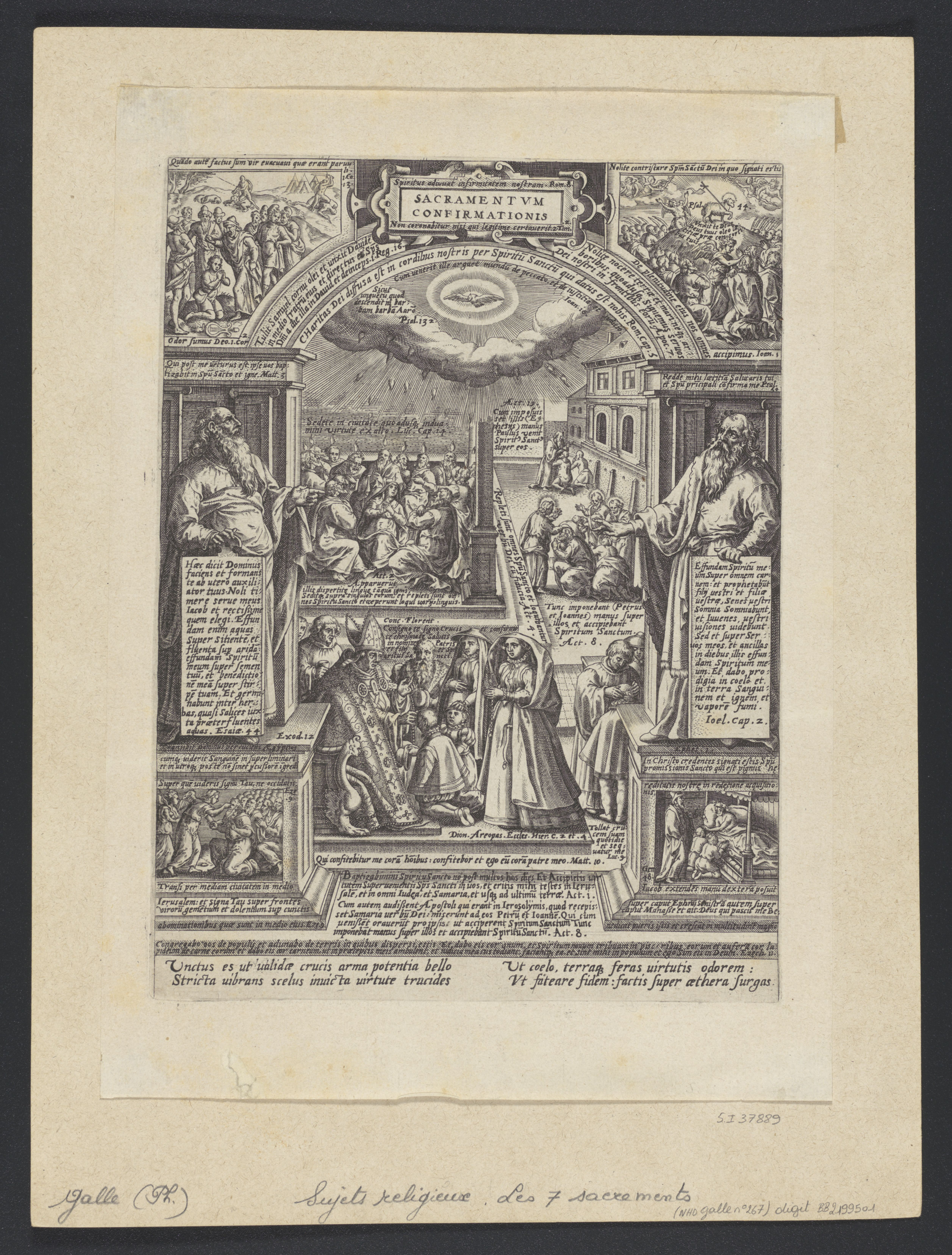
Confirmation

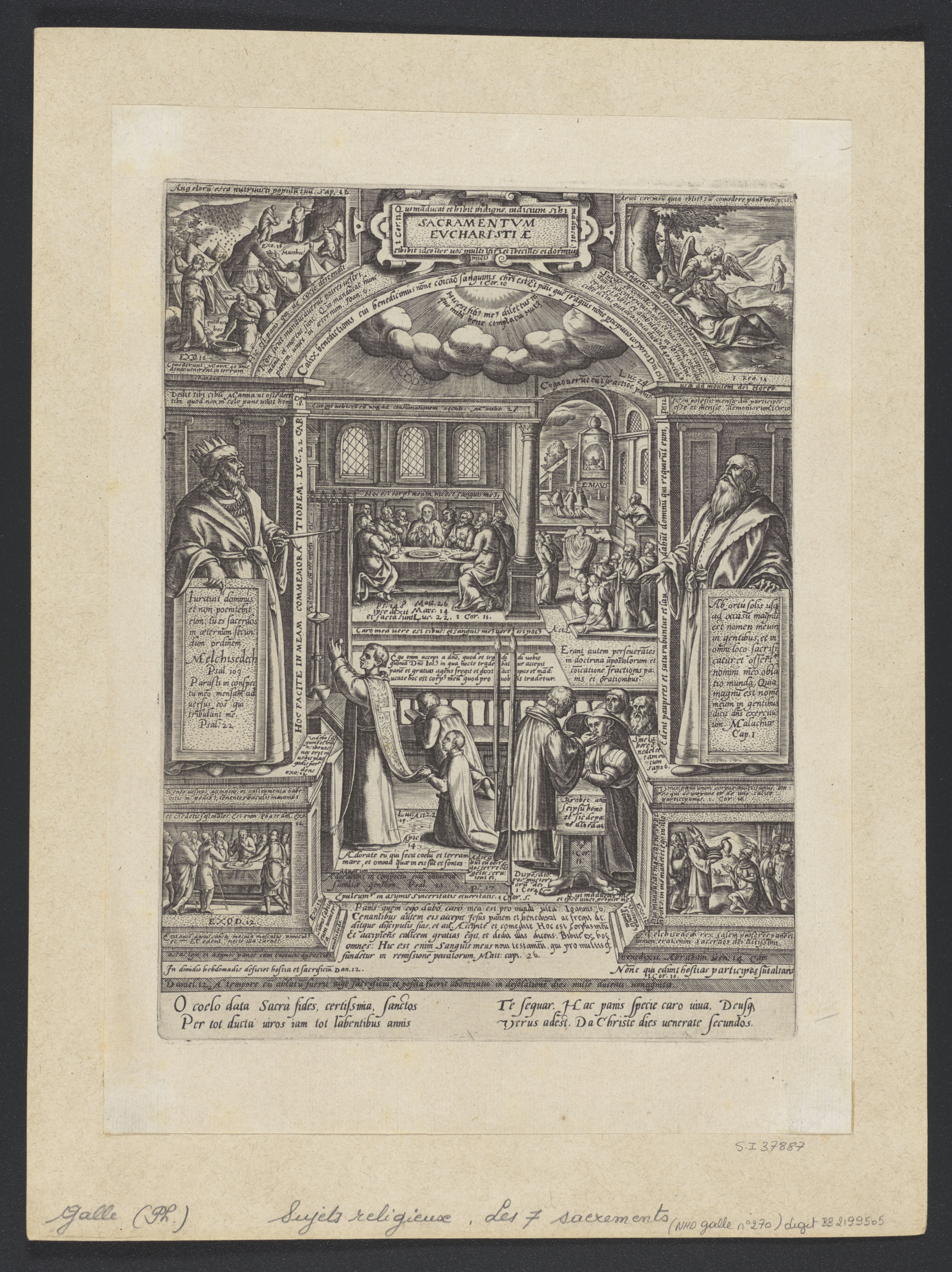
Eucharist

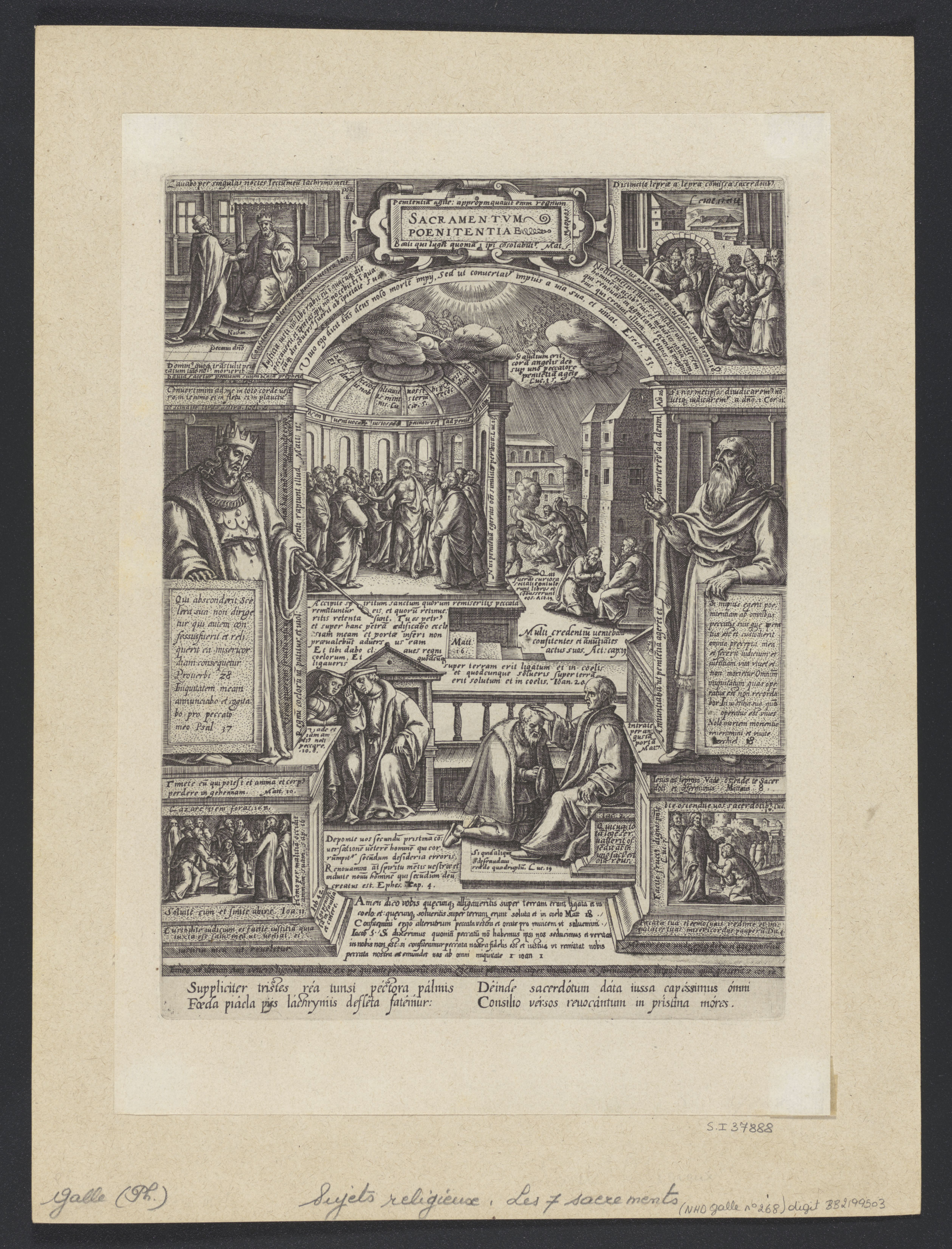
Penance

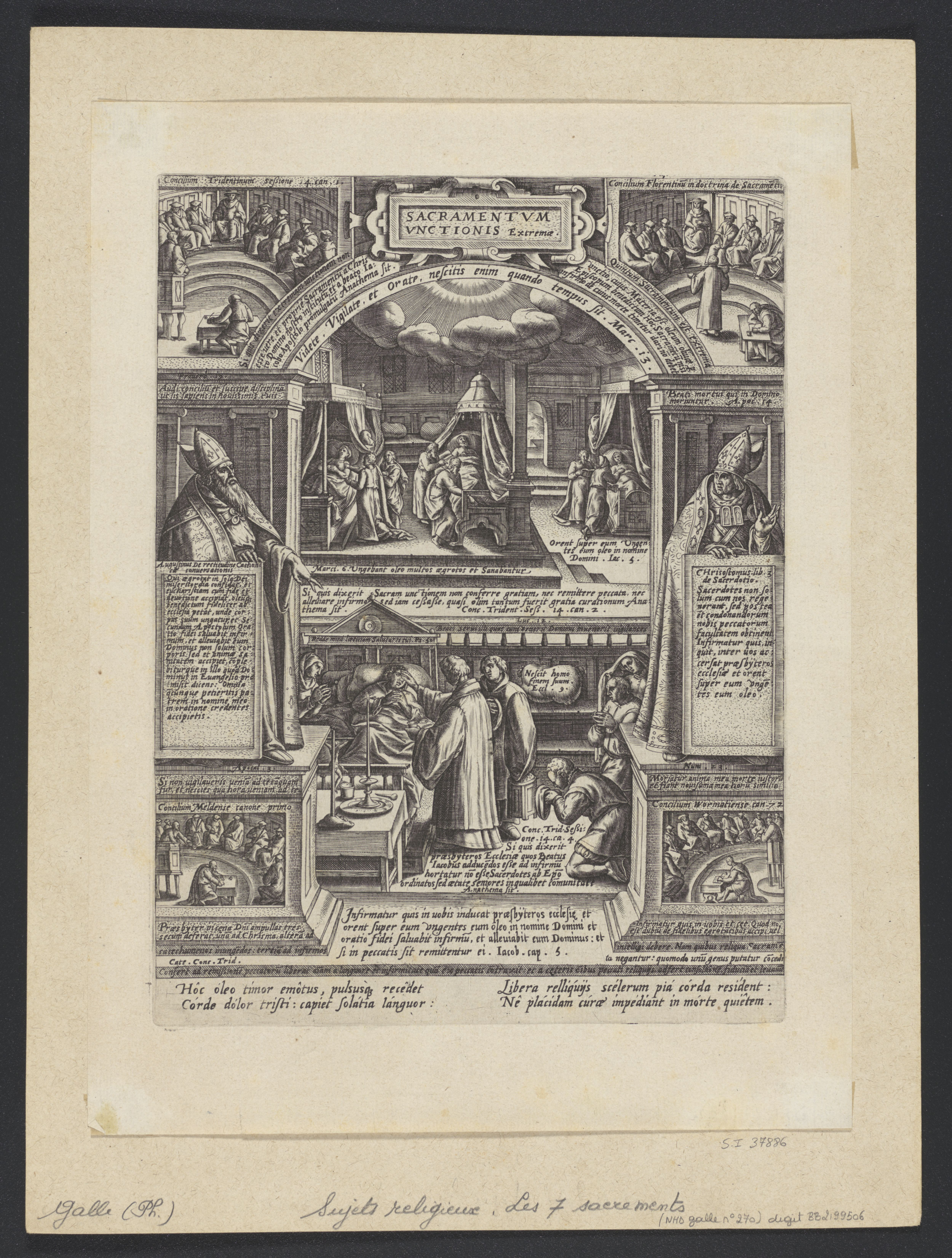
Anointing of the Sick

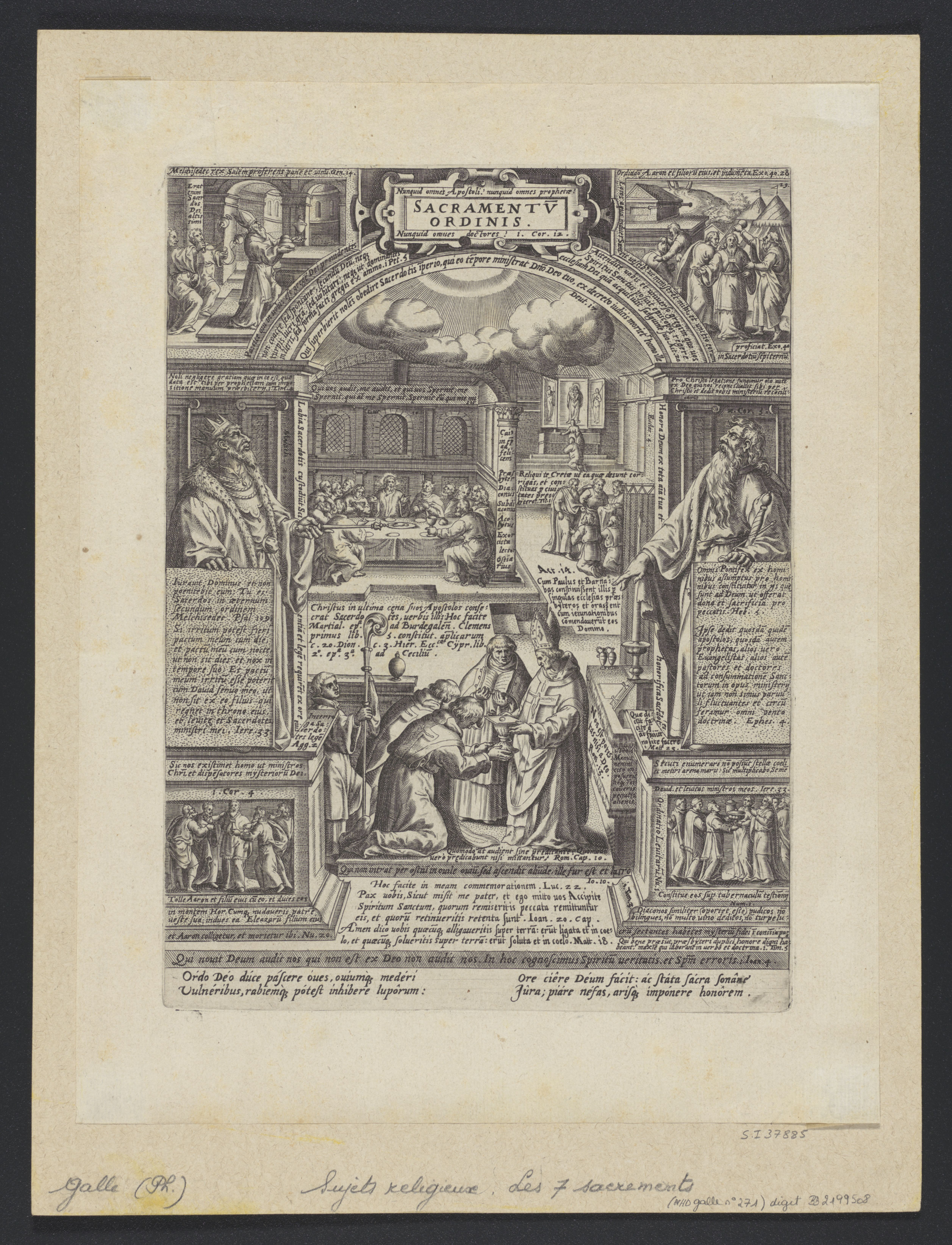
Holy Orders

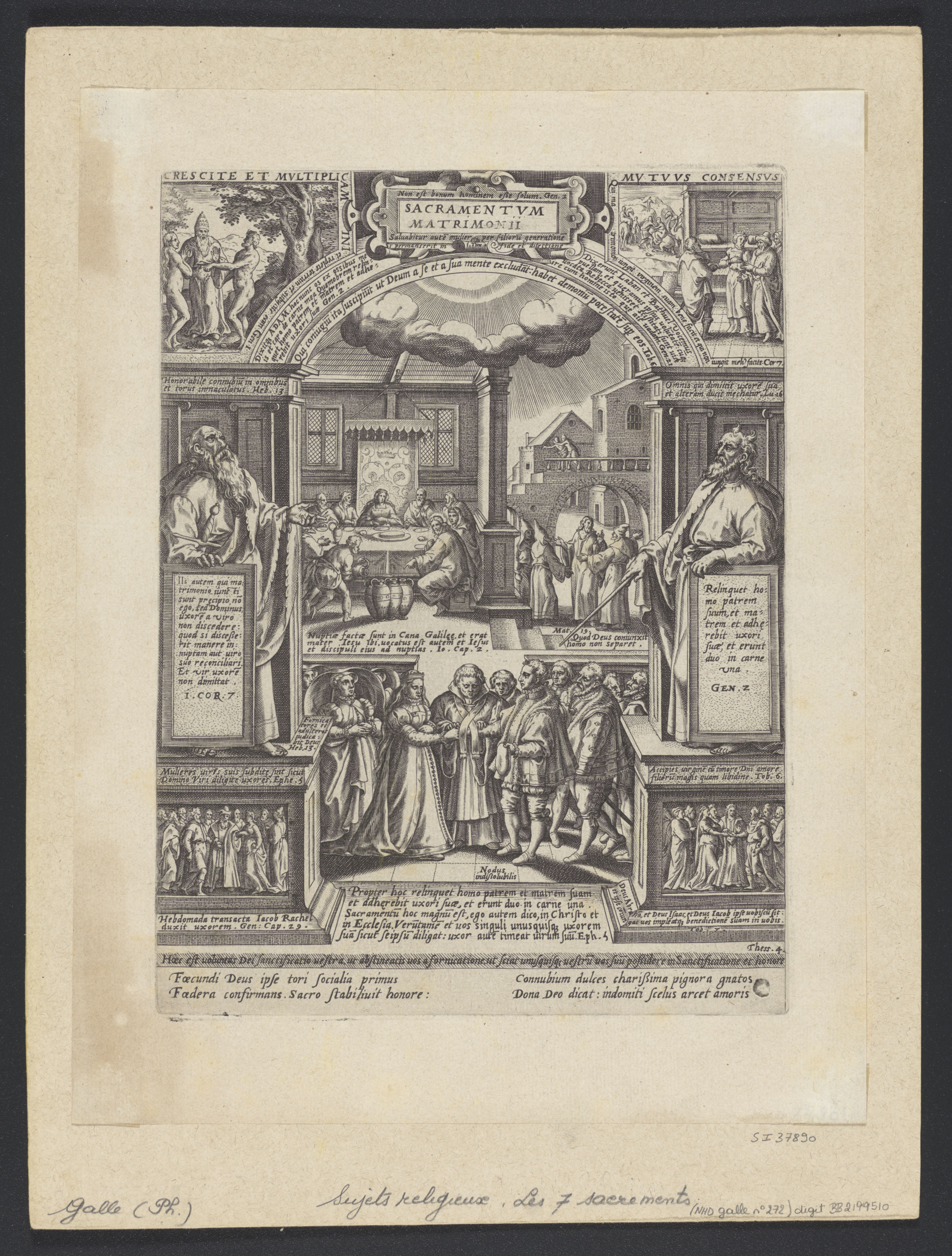
Matrimony
