= Jacques Colaert =

Flemish privateer

- Died: 1600; Flushing
- Piratical career
- Type: Dunkirker (privateer)
- Allegiance: Habsburg
- Base of operations: Dunkirk
- Commands: six-gun vessel Crabbelcat
- Battles: Eighty Years' War

Jacques Colaert or Jacob Collaart (died September 1600) was a Flemish privateer who during the Dutch Revolt sailed in royal service as one of the Dunkirkers.

A privateer based in Dunkirk, Colaert in August 1600 sailed with a fleet under command of Vice Admiral Anton of Burgundy, Lord of Wacken. The fleet consisted of six Spanish royal ships and six independent privateers; Colaert commanded the six-gun vessel Crabbelcat with a crew of 43 sailors.

Leaving Dunkirk on the night of 9 or 10 August, the privateering expedition faced problems early on when two Flemish privateers, Sibrant Pietersen and Rippert Rippertsen, failed to rendezvous with the fleet on 11 August. Three days later, a fishing fleet under the protection of six warships was sighted off the coast of Scotland. Ordered to attack, the warships eventually fled after a cannonball hit the gunpowder room of the warship Den Dolphijn, the resulting explosion killing its crew and commander Captain Willem Dirkszoon Cloyer. After the death of Captain Mathieu Jacobsen of the warship Parel, the fishing fleet was defenceless against the privateers.

The fishermen, many of them Mennonites, were reportedly treated harshly in retribution for similar treatment of captured Dunkirkers (as described in 1661 by Van Meteren's Historiën).

Over the next several days, other fishing fleets were targeted by the privateers including a fleet of thirteen vessels escorted by the Dutch warship De Victorie from Maassluis. During the attack, the warship was destroyed by a cannonball hitting the gunpowder room; two fishing boats were later sunk. The captured sailors were treated less severely, as privateers rescued six surviving crew members of the sunken De Victorie as well as allowing the fishermen to leave their boats as the privateers looted the remaining ships (although the first mates were held captive and later ransomed). During this time, several privateers left the expedition including Captain Willem Jansen who headed for Spain.

Several other fishing fleets were attacked and, on 19 August, the privateers captured one fishing vessel which had attempted to resist and sank it while the crew was still aboard. While three other vessels were sunk in the attack, their crews were saved.

Changing course the following day, the expedition sailed east in the hope of targeting merchants traveling on the trading routes of Eastern Europe. Only a day into their journey, the privateers soon captured nine Dutch merchants en route to Danzig with a cargo of salt. During the next several days, the privateers experienced stormy weather and, prevented from attacking a merchant fleet of thirty merchant ships on 22 August, Captains Michel Jacobsen and Frans Pleite became separated from the fleet.

Anthonie Sailly, an agent of the States-General of the Netherlands at Calais, informed the Dutch government regarding the attacks by the privateering expedition and, by 16 August, two fleets began to be organized to locate and take action against the privateers while all available vessels in Rotterdam were sent out in search of them.

The seven remaining privateers eventually encountered one of these Dutch fleets sent out against them, near the island of Vlieland, commanded by Captain Arie Corneliszoon Cruyck. The privateers fled from Cruyck's force reportedly dumping as much cargo overboard as possible in an attempt to outrun the Dutch naval fleet. Although chased all through the North Sea beyond their base Dunkirk, some of the privateers were able to escape to Dieppe or Spain.

Among those captured however, Colaert and his crew were forced to surrender after the Crabbelcat's masts were destroyed in an action off Dunkirk. Taken to the city of Flushing in Zeeland, he and thirty-seven of his crew (with the exception of six boys) were publicly hanged in September 1600.
