= Jan Collaert II =

Flemish engraver and printmaker (c. 1561–c. 1620)

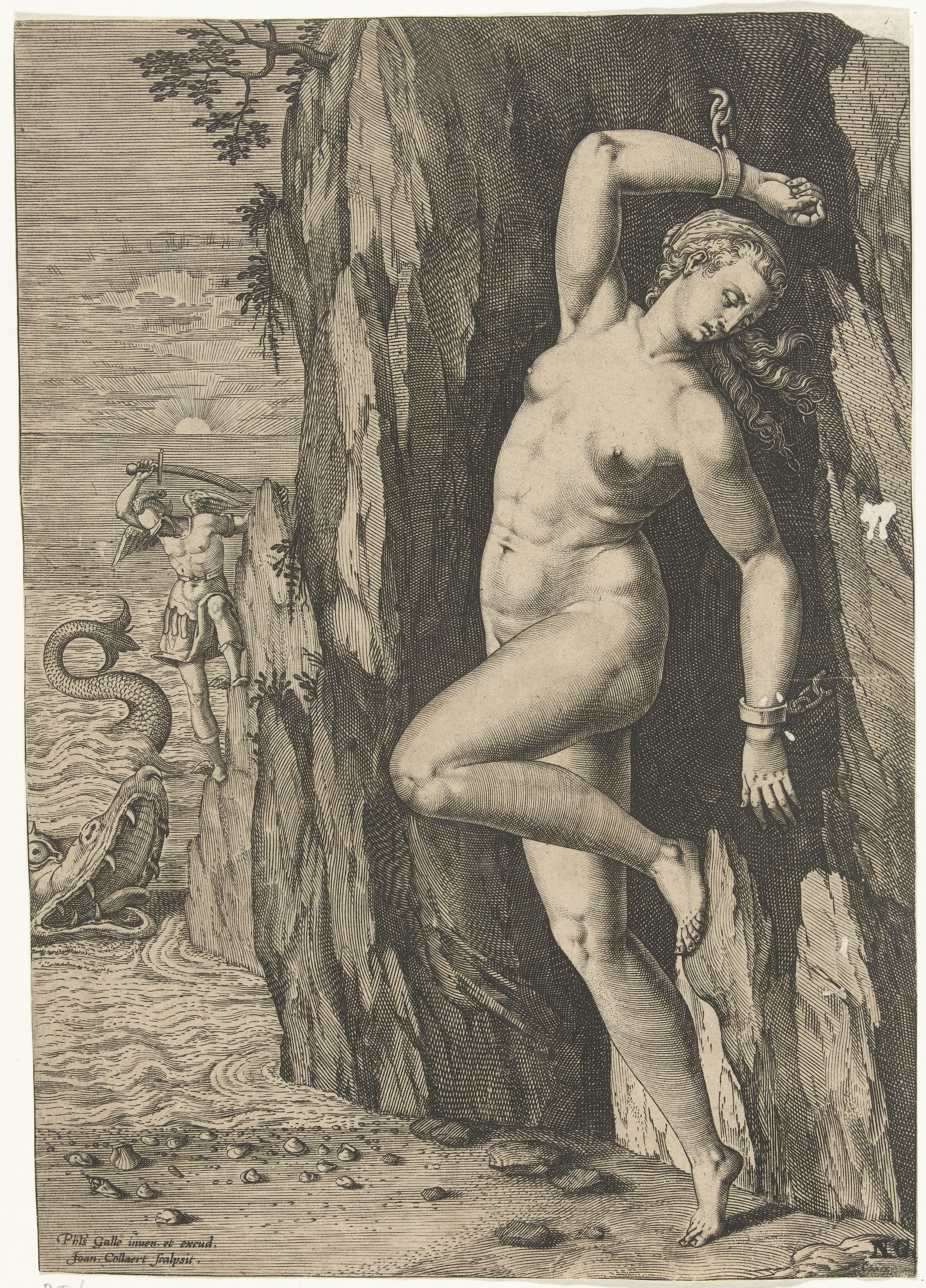
Perseus and Andromeda

Jan Collaert II or Hans Collaert II (c. 1561 in Antwerp – in or after 1620 in Antwerp) was a Flemish engraver and printmaker working in Antwerp around the turn of the 17th century. Collaert also published under the name Jan Baptist Collaert.

== Life ==
Jan Collaert was the son of Anna van der Heijde and Jan Collart I and the brother of Adriaen Collaert. He trained under his brother Adriaen as well as with leading Antwerp engravers Philip Galle and Gerard de Jode. He became member of the Antwerp Guild of Saint Luke in 1585 and was the Guild's dean in 1612.

From 1580 through his death c. 1620, Collaert and his brother were both employed by Philip Galle, one of the most prolific print publishers in Europe during the late sixteenth century. The brothers both married a daughter of Galle. Jan married in the late 1590s with Elisabeth Galle, after he became a widower of Elisabeth Firens, whom he had married in 1595. The last entry on Jan Collaert II in the Guild's records dates from the yearbook 1620/21.

His pupils included Barbara van den Broeck and Antony van der Does.

== Work ==
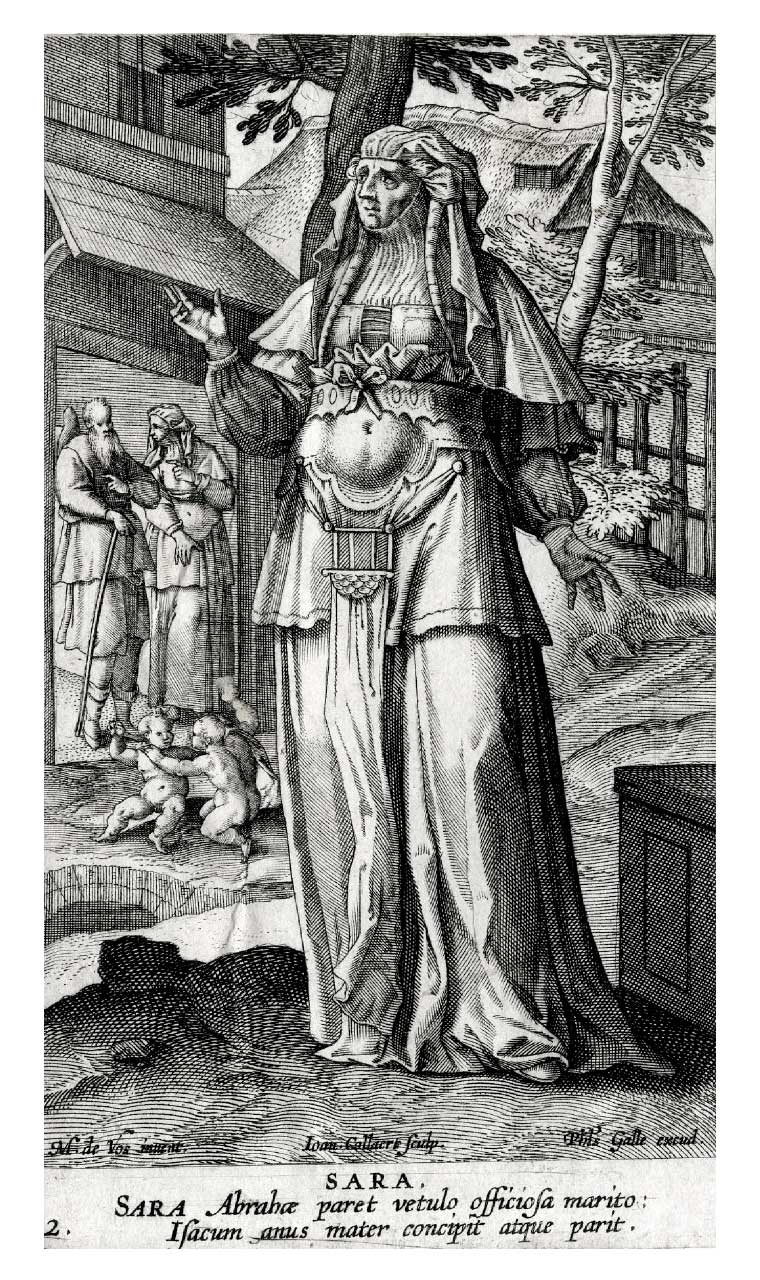
"Sara" engraving by Jan Collaert II, from Icones Illustrium Feminarum Veteris Testamenti, book published in 1591 in Antwerp

Engravers of the period often worked from drawings done by a different artist and many of both the

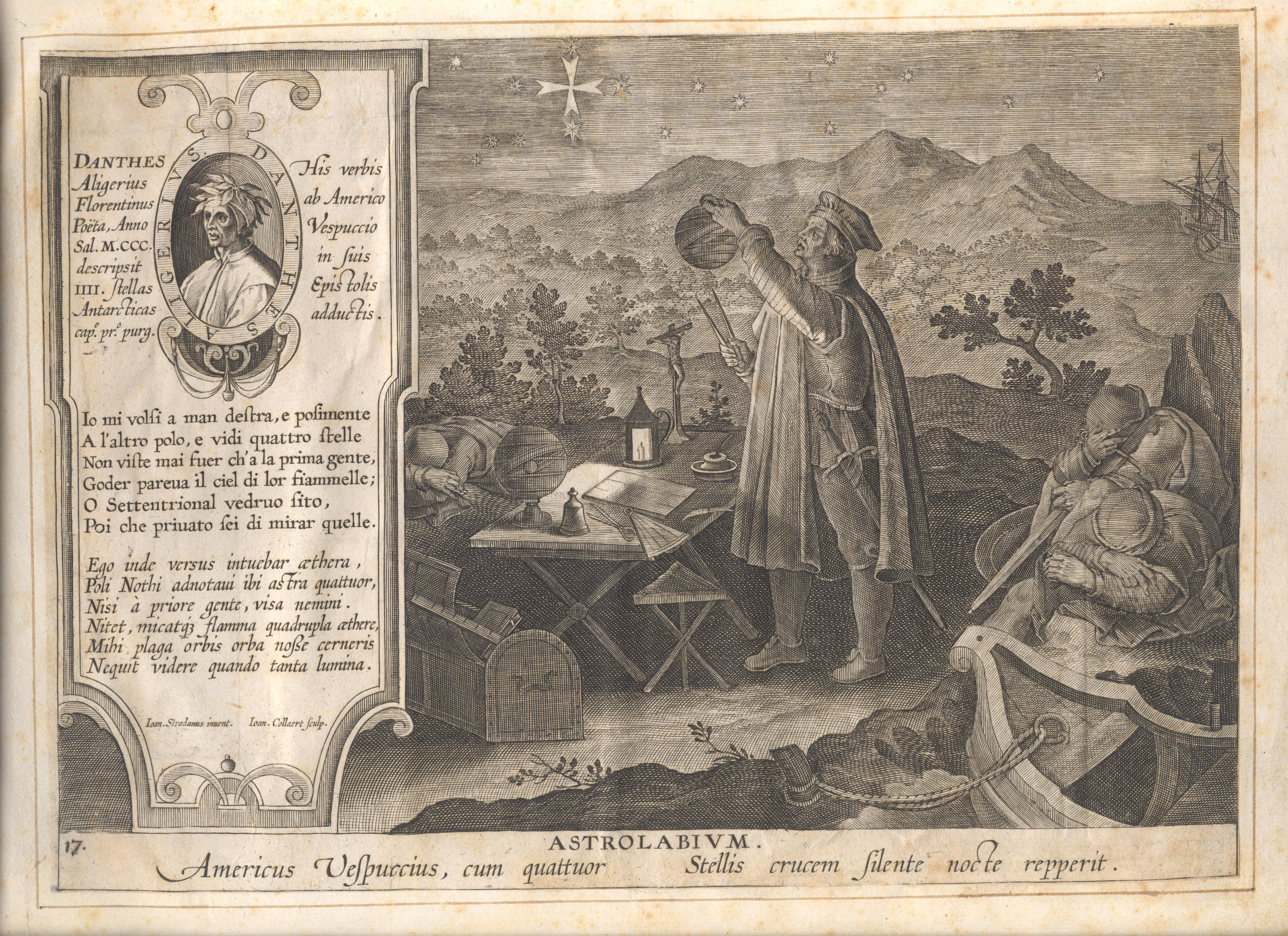
Het gebruik van het astrolabium door Amerigo Vespucci, Jan Collaert II, Plantin-Moretus Museum

Collaert brothers' etchings are recorded as being "after Phillip Gale". Another contemporary draughtsman who provided source material was Maerten de Vos, a Flemish painter in the Mannerist tradition. De Vos was the author of approximately 1600 drawings that later were made into prints. Collaert also made a series of prints after de Vos' drawings.

The series of twenty illustrations- plus a title page- depicting Biblical characters engaged in heroic acts were completed between 1590 and 1595 in association with Cornelis van Kiel, a Dutch lexicographer and writer, for his Latin text Icones Illustrium Feminarum Veteris Testamenti (The Celebrated Women of the Old Testament). The engravings, "clearly Mannerist in inspiration" are reminiscent of Sandro Botticelli's work, detailed portrayals of Rubenesque figures with tiny heads and expressive hands.

He also produced book illustrations for Antwerp publishing house Plantin Moretus.

== Bibliography ==
- Hollstein, F W H (Amsterdam, 1993). "The New Hollstein: Dutch and Flemish etchings, engravings and woodcuts 1450-1700",

== Further reading on the Collaert dynasty ==
- Diels, et al. "Wat d'yser can bemaelen : les estampes des graveurs anversois Collaert(1550-1630)".
- Diels, et al.(2010). "De familie Collaert (ca. 1555-1630) en de prentkunst in Antwerpen" ("The family Collaert (ca. 1555-1630) and printmaking in Antwerp").
- Sellink, M. (Amsterdam, 1997). "Philips Galle (1537-1612) Engraver and print publisher in Haarlem and Antwerp".
- Spaightwood Galleries , "Images of Women in Renaissance Prints and Drawings: Maarten de Vos: Women of the Old Testament", 2009
