= Adriaen Collaert =

Flemish engraver (c. 1560 – 1618)

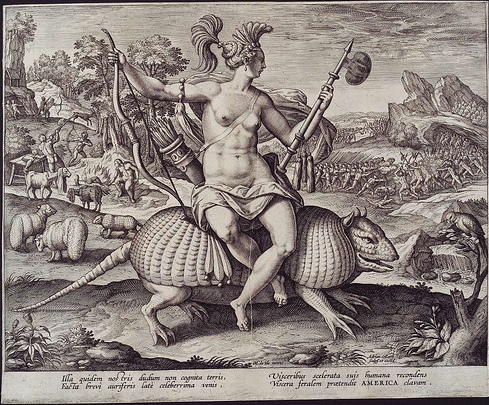
America, from a series on the Four continents, after Maerten de Vos.

Adriaen Collaert (c. 1560 – 29 June 1618) was a Flemish designer and engraver.

== Biography ==
He was born in Antwerp between 1555 and 1565. According to the Netherlands Institute for Art History, in 1580 he became wijnmeester of the Guild of St. Luke. The title wijnmeester was reserved for sons of members, and he was the son of Jan Collaert I and Anna van der Heijden. He married Justa Galle, the daughter of the man he worked for, Philip Galle. He also worked for Gerard de Jode (where he made prints after Maerten de Vos), Eduard Hoeswinckel and Hans van Luyck. After having learnt the principles of the art in his own country, he visited Italy for improvement, where he passed some years. On his return to Flanders, he engraved a great number of plates, executed in a neatly finished style, but with a certain degree of dryness. He died in Antwerp in 1618. His drawing is correct, and his heads expressive. He sometimes marked his plates with a cipher.

From 1593 to 1594 he took on pupils and from 1589 he worked for Plantijn Moretus. His pupils were Jan Boel, Quirin Boel (I), Adriaan Boon, Jan Collaert (II), and Abraham van Merlen. He was also an independent print publisher.

Adriaen Collaert was the brother of Jan Collaert II, and he had a son, Jan Baptist Collaert II or Jan Collaert III (1591 - 1627/8), and a grandson who followed in his footsteps as print makers and publishers.

The following are his principal productions:

== Subjects from his own designs ==
- A Man and his Wife, conducted by Death. 1562.
- A Man in Armour, to whom a Woman brings a Child, a Dog, and a Cock.
- The Life of Jesus Christ; in thirty-six plates.
- Thirty plates of Birds.
- One hundred and twenty-five plates of Fishes.
- Twenty-four plates; entitled Florilegium ab Hadriano Collaert caelatum, &c.
- The Temptation of St. Anthony.
- St. Apollonia.

== Subjects after various masters ==
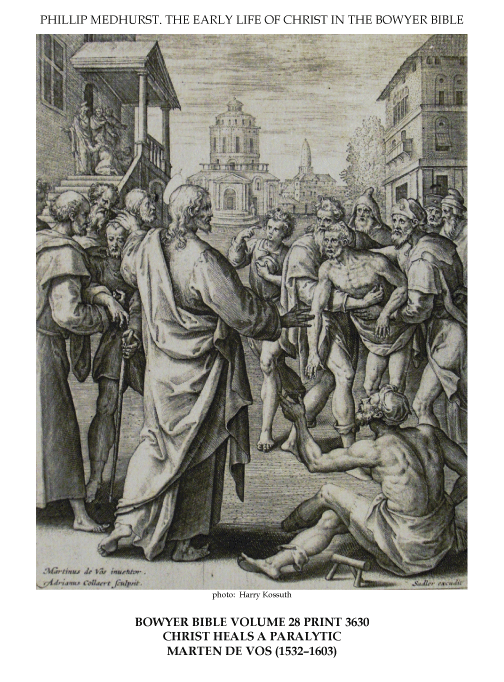
The healing of a paralytic by Jesus, after Marten de Vos, ca. 1585, from the Bowyer Bible.

- The Twelve Months of the Year; after Josse De Momper; the same that Callot has engraved
- The Seven Planets 1581; after Maerten de Vos
- Four Continents 1588–89; after the same
- The Four Elements; in four plates, after the same
- The Last Judgment; after J. Stradan
- St. Hubert; after the same
- Twelve plates of Horses; after the same
- A Hunting and Fishing Party; after the same
- The Israelitish Women singing the Song of Praise for the Destruction of the Egyptian Host in the Red Sea; after the same
- A Woman saving her Child from a Lion; after the same
- Twelve Landscapes; after Hendrick van Cleve III
- A set of Hermitesses; after M. de Vos; engraved conjointly with his son Hans Collaert
- The Calling of St. Andrew to the Apostleship; after Barocci
- The Repose in Egypt 1585; after H. Goltzius
- A set of six plates, called the Annunciations; considered among the best of his works
