= Florini =

Florini may refer to:

- Florina, a town in Greece

== People with the name ==
- Francis C. Florini, an American politician
- Ann Florini, an American clinical professor
- Giovanni Florimi, an Italian engraver
