= New World Scene =

Woodprint of Native Americans

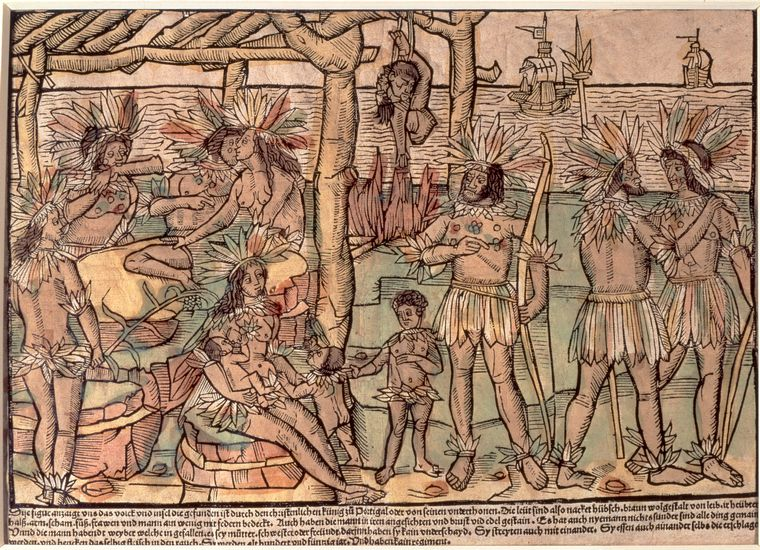
- New World Scene produced by Johann Froschauer circa 1505 CE, hand painted woodprint
- Artist: Johann Froschauer
- Year: 1505
- Medium: Woodcut
- Dimensions: 22 cm × 33.3 cm (8.7 in × 13.1 in)

New World Scene is a woodcut thought to have been made in 1505 by Johann Froschauer, a German artist based in Augsburg, Germany. The woodcut measures 22 cm by 33.3 cm and a hand-colored copy is in the New York Public Library.

It is a key early example of European depictions of the New World, "considered the earliest depiction of American Indians to be at least somewhat ethnographically accurate". It was probably inspired by the descriptions of Amerigo Vespucci in his book Mundus Novum, which detailed his experiences during his time in the "New World", or what is now known as the Americas.

== Description ==
In this scene a group of Native American people gather on the ocean shore. All the figures, except for the young children, wear colored headdresses of blue, red, and white feathers with matching skirts of the same material. In the foreground, a mother breast feeds a baby while two other children seek her attention. To the right of her are three men who appear to be conversing. Two of them hold large wooden bows while the third holds a spear topped by an arrowhead and feathers. On the left side of the foreground, a figure stands with a long plant in hand, watching a group gathered under a bare wooden structure. One of them holds a severed human arm up to their mouth in the act of taking a bite of flesh. Opposite this figure is another, who holds on to a different severed limb. A third person is seen looking towards the center of the image at a dismembered hanging body. The body, cut at the torso and hanging from the rafters of the wooden structure, cooks above a blazing fire. None of the figures in the picture are wearing shoes, though most of them have their arms and chests adorned with bands of feathers that match the rest of their attire. In the background are two large ships, complete with masts and sails that sport an emblem. Though none of the Native Americans seem to have noticed these ships, it appears as though they are heading toward them.

In the New York copy, the coloring of the picture bleeds outside the printed lines. The colors are also inconsistent and show variation, being lighter in some areas rather than others. Though distinct, they are not vibrant. This suggests that the coloring may have been done using watercolor.

== Artist ==
There is little information that details the life and activities of Johann Froschauer. He was born sometime in the early 15th century (the exact date is not known) and died in the year 1523. Froschauer mainly operated in Augsburg Germany as a printmaker and was later considered the most important printer during his time, helping to advance the print trade as well as train others in the art of printmaking.

== Background and context ==
New World Scene was made by the German artist Johann Froschauer as a reaction to the descriptions of Native Americans made by Amerigo Vespucci in his book Mundus Novum. Vespucci was an explorer and navigator who made multiple trips to the Americas in the early 16th century, detailing his findings and interactions with the Native people he met. It was the journal he made on his second trip to the Americas where he visited the region now known as Brazil in which he turned his documentation into the book Mundus Novum. In particular, Vespucci took great care to detail his interactions with the Brazilian Tupinamba tribe he met during his time there, describing their attire, customs, and interactions that were prominent in their culture. Though historians are unsure of the accuracy of the descriptions found in his book, Mundus Novum described the Native American groups that Vespucci interacted with as "lawless, lustful, and cannibalistic", which greatly influenced the art based on his words.

Upon arriving back in Europe, his words inspired artists like Froschauer to create depictions of Indigenous people based on what Vespucci had described in his writings. Eventually, many of these pieces of art were commissioned to be included in Mundus Novum. In the case of New World Scene, Froschauer created this piece specifically to be included in Vespucci's book and is considered to be the first depiction to show Native American tribes as being cannibalistic, though not all elements in the image represent the Tupinamba Native Americans in actuality.

== Text ==
The text found at the bottom of the picture, originally written in German, reads: "This figure represents to us the people and island, which have been discovered by the Christian King of Portugal or by his subjects. The people are thus naked, handsome, brown, well shaped in body, their heads, necks, arms, private parts, feet of men and women are a little covered with feathers. The men also have many precious stones in their faces and breasts. No one also has anything, but all things are in common. And the men have as wives those who please them, be they mothers, sisters, or friends, therein make they no distinction. They also fight with each other. They also eat each other even those who are slain, and hang the flesh of them in the smoke. They become a hundred and fifty years old. And have no government," The text describes the thoughts of the artist on the Native American tribes described in the Americas in narrative form.

== Interpretation ==
After its publication, Mundus Novum became widely distributed throughout Europe and began to shape the European view of the Americas and the native populations that resided there. While some elements of this book were accurate, such as specific descriptions of their attire and the tradition of cannibalism, it gave the Native American population a negative connotation among European readers and missionaries. By describing them as "savages", Vespucci's work, alongside others who described Native American people in this way, became the foundation for colonists, explorers, and missionaries alike to travel to what we know today as North and South America to try and convert them to a more European way of life via Christianity.

One of the main reasons behind the European quest to convert Native American populations to Christianity was the tradition of cannibalism found that was prevalent in the culture of some tribes. While the Tupinamba tribe did practice a form of cannibalism, this practice cannot be made of every Native tribe in America at that time. Even amongst tribes that did participate in cannibalistic tendencies, this tradition was not as lawless and common as Vespucci's work made it out to be. Tribal wars were very common amongst different tribes of Native Americans. If the Tupinamba tribe captured a warrior of an opposing clan, they would set a date for when the tribe would kill them and prepare a feast in their honor. During their captivity, the tribe would take great care in treating their prisoner with respect, even sometimes gifting them a wife until they were due to be killed

Another reason behind the European movement to Christianize the native peoples of the Americas was due to their differing lifestyles, such as their attire and primitive way of life. Though New World Scene shows the Tupinamba people dressed in what many Europeans thought was traditional Native American attire, many features of their clothing, interactions, and practices were proven not to be factual by historians. The feather headpieces worn in the print were relatively accurate, and some indigenous tribes wore bracelets and "crowns" made of feathers; however the feather skirts worn by the figures were not accurate. More commonly, the Tupinamba tribe wore close to nothing with no shoes or bottoms. The purpose of this change in depiction is thought to be because of an attempt to make them seem more relatable, or recognizable, to a Western European audience. By giving them characteristics and clothing materials that viewers recognized, they would be able to connect with these new people. The Tupinamba people also commonly used a 'hunting and gathering' type of social structure in order to provide food for their tribe. They slept in hammocks, lived in long thatch huts, and promoted those who lived in these huts to become the tribal council. This was how many Native American tribes lived; it was simply their way of life. To many Europeans, though, this way of life seemed underdeveloped and in need of assistance. This soon became another reason for why missionaries and colonizers felt as though they needed to spread a more European way of life to native populations by traveling to America.
