= Stradanus =

Flemish artist (1523–1605)

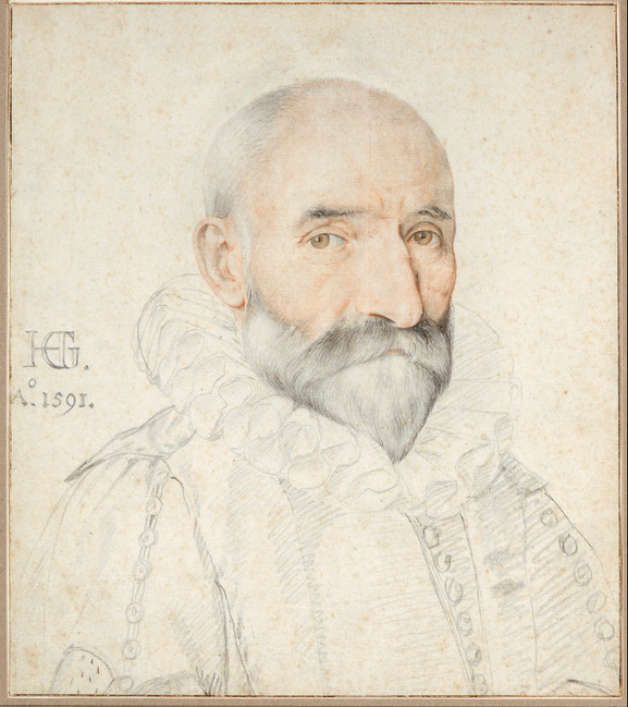
Portrait of Stradanus by Hendrick Goltzius, 1591

Johannes Stradanus (Dutch Jan van der Straet or Italian Giovanni Stradano; 1523 – 2 November 1605) was a Flemish artist active mainly in 16th-century Florence, Italy. He was a wide-ranging talent who worked as an easel and fresco painter, designer of tapestries, draughtsman, designer of prints and pottery decorator. His subject range was varied and included history subjects, mythological scenes, allegories, landscapes, genre scenes, portraits, architectural scenes and animals. After training in his native Flanders, he left his home country and ultimately settled down in Florence, Italy. He became a prominent court artist to the Medici during the second half of the 16th century and worked on the many decorative projects of the court. Stradanus also produced large altarpieces for the most important churches in Florence.

He was a prolific designer of prints which were circulated widely throughout Europe for many centuries. Through his knowledge of Florentine and Italian art and his international contacts with engravers and editors in Antwerp, Stradanus contributed to the development of printmaking. He was one of the earliest members of the prominent Accademia e Compagnia delle Arti del Disegno established in Florence in 1563. Stradanus also worked on various commissions in Rome, and resided in Naples from 1576 until about 1580. Thereafter he returned to Florence, dying there in 1605.

== Life ==
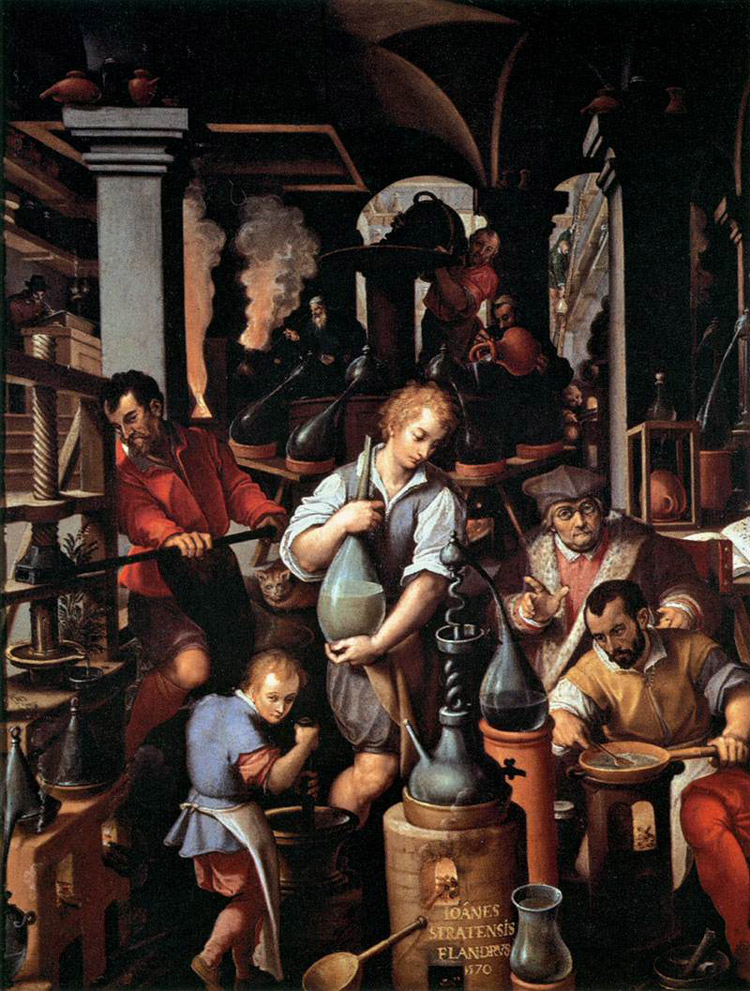
The Alchemist's Studio, 1571

Born in Bruges, he began his training in the shop of his father. He subsequently continued his training in the workshop of the otherwise unknown Bruges master Maximiliaen Francken (from 1535 to 1537). He later moved to Antwerp, where he studied from 1537 to 1540 in the workshop of Pieter Aertsen, a Dutch genre painter active in that city. There he mastered the visual language of the Renaissance and the ability to depict complex compositions. In 1545 he was registered under the name Hans vander Straten as a master painter in the Antwerp guild of Saint Luke. In Antwerp he moved in the circle of the Romanists, i.e. Northern artists who had traveled to Italy and upon their return to their home country created a Renaissance style, which assimilated Italian formal language.

As was common at the time, Stradanus left his home country to complete his studies in Italy. He traveled first to Lyon where he may have worked with the Dutch painter Corneille de la Haye. He then moved on to Venice where he spent a few months. In Venice he met the Flemish carpet weaver Jan Rost who headed up the newly established Arazzeria Medicea, the personal weaving workshop in Florence of the Grand Duke of Tuscany Cosimo I de' Medici. Rost encouraged Stradanus to travel to Florence for work. He followed the advice and reached Florence in 1550, where he entered in the service of the Medici Grand Dukes. He became one of the principal assistants of Giorgio Vasari, a painter, architect and the principal advisor of the Medici on art issues. Stradanus carried out his first commissions as a designer of tapestries in the Arazzeria Medicea. He designed a number of scenes for tapestries and frescoes to decorate the Palazzo Vecchio in Florence and the Medici Villa at Poggio a Caiano, projects that were under the general direction of Vasari and executed by the about 20 assistants in Vasari's workshop.

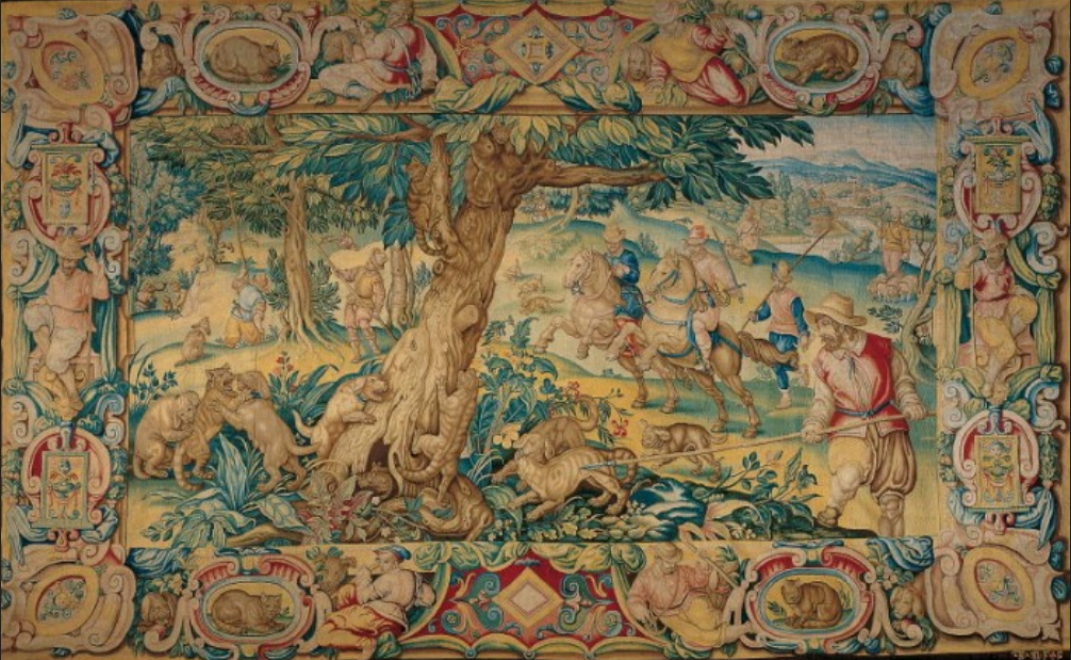
Wildcat Hunt, tapestry

During the period from 1550 to 1553, he spent time in Rome to work on commissions. Here he assisted Francesco Salviati and also worked with Daniele da Volterra on the decoration of the Vatican Belvedere. Some time between 1550 and 1555 Stradanus married Lucrezia di Lorenzo Guardieri. Two children from this marriage were Lucrezia (before 1556) and Scipione (1556–1612). Scipione became an artist and collaborated with his father on some projects. Stradanus became financially successful and he was able to acquire a house and other possessions as well as donate substantial sums to religious institutions. One of these was the Sant'Agata Monastery, where his daughter Lucrezia became a nun in 1569.

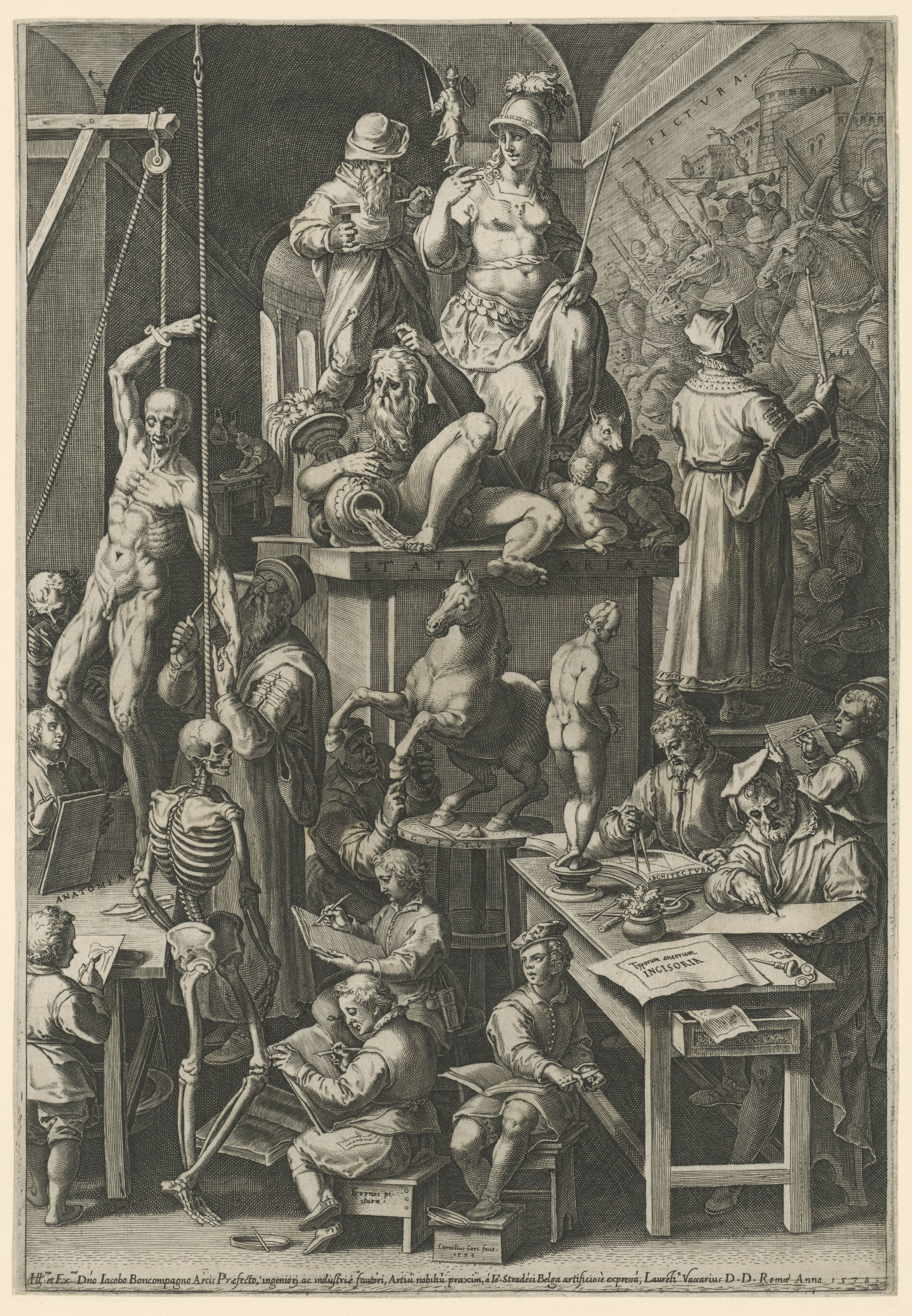
Allegory of the arts, engraved by Cornelis Cort after Stradanus

Stradanus worked in Florence in a milieu that included Vasari, Bronzino, Allori and Salviati. Stradanus was one of the earliest members together with the aforementioned artists of the Accademia e Compagnia delle Arti del Disegno, after its establishment was approved by the Medici court on 13 January 1563 at the request of Vasari. The Accademia e Compagnia delle Arti del Disegno acted both as a guild for all working artists in Florence and an institution for education in the arts. Stradanus later became a consul of this institution. He also taught classes at the Accademia, and one of his pupils was Antonio Tempesta. He played a key role in the design of the tomb of Michelangelo who died in 1564. Stradanus also worked on various ephemeral works created for important public events in Florence. In 1565, he was a member of the team of painters and sculptors who executed the large-scale decorations at the occasion of the entry into Florence of Joanna of Austria, Grand Duchess of Tuscany on the occasion of her wedding with Francesco I de' Medici, Grand Duke of Tuscany. The overall direction of the project was in the hands of Giorgio Vasari.

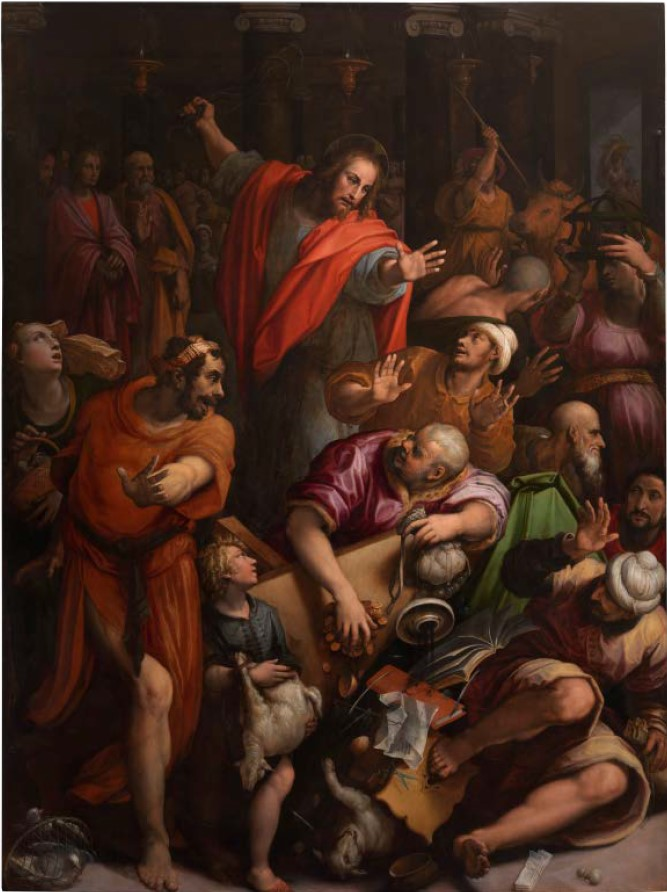
Cleansing of the Temple, 1572

Stradanus was one of the artists involved in the decoration of the Studiolo of Francesco I, the small, windowless barrel-vaulted room in the Palazzo Vecchio commissioned by Francesco I de' Medici and completed between 1570 and 1575 after designs by Vasari. The room was a Wunderkammer (Hall of Wonders), containing a vast collection of rare and precious items such as gems, medals, precious metals, carvings, pharmaceuticals and animal exhibits. Representations of the four elements (earth, air, fire and water) covered each wall. Stradanus contributed two paintings to the decoration of the Studiolo: The Alchemist's Studio and Circe transforms the companions of Ulysses.

In the early 1570s Stradanus seems to have become independent of the court and Vasari. By this time the relationship between Stradanus and Vasari had soured and Vasari even tried to prevent Stradanus from gaining certain commissions. During this period he created a number of easel paintings. He had started to gain on his own commissions for large altarpieces for the most important churches of Florence, starting with Santa Croce in 1569, which was followed by Santissima Annunziata, Santo Spirito, Santa Maria Novella and other churches. He was also gradually working more outside Florence in places such as Pisa, Prato, Arezzo and Forli. In 1576 he moved to Naples, where he was employed by the newly appointed vice`roy of Naples John of Austria. He visited around 1578 Antwerp possibly traveling from Naples in the company of John of Austria who had been appointed governor of the Spanish Netherlands. At that time Antwerp was the most important centre of printing and publishing in Europe. Following this visit, he began to design engravings for the Antwerp printers, eventually producing a large number of drawings destined to be translated into prints. Stradanus collaborated with printmakers Hieronymus Cock and the Galle family in Antwerp to produce hundreds of prints on a variety of subjects, most of which were repeatedly reproduced and often bound into volumes.

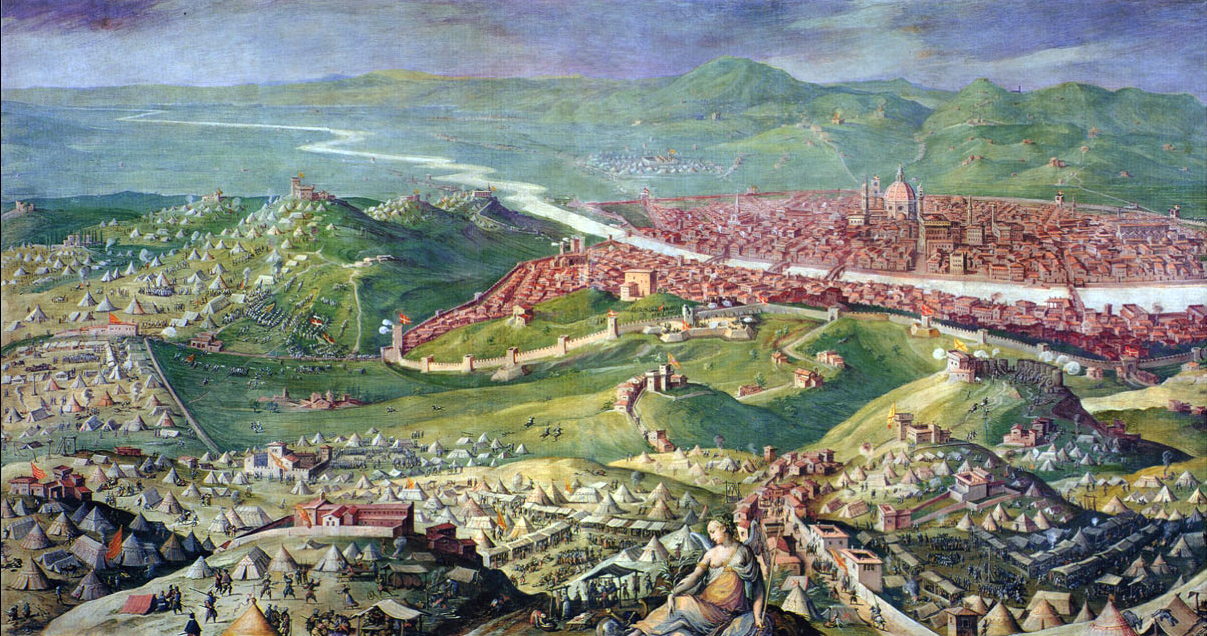
1530 Siege of Florence. Palazzo Vecchio, Sala di Clemente VII.

By 1583 Stradanus had returned to Florence. He worked that year for the Pazzi family for whom he painted an extensive series of frescoes for the chapel in Villa Pazzi al Parugiano in Montemurlo near Florence. He worked between 1585 and 1587 on a commission by Alessandro Ottaviano de' Medici (later Pope Leo XI) on frescoes for the chapel of the Palazzo Della Gherardesca in Florence.

He died in Florence on 2 November 1605. He was buried in the Cappella della Compagnia di Santa Barbara of de Santissima Annunziata in Florence. To this day, his tomb is decorated with a bust of the artist, made after a portrait by his son Scipio, together with an inscription referring to his Flemish roots.

== Work ==
=== General ===
Stradanus was a versatile artist who worked as an easel and fresco painter, designer of tapestries, draughtsman, designer of prints and pottery decorator. His subject range was varied and included history subjects, mythological and religious scenes, allegories, landscapes, genre scenes, portraits, battle pieces, architectural scenes and animals. He was a prolific designer of prints which were circulated widely throughout Europe for many centuries. It is Stradanus' versality and relentless zest for work that ensured him such an important role in the workshop of Vasari and in the Florentine art world which he was able to maintain for almost 60 years. Around 1580 he commissioned a printed self-portrait (engraved by Johannes Wierix) accompanied by the following motto: ASSIDUITATE NIHIL NON ADSEQUITUR (There is nothing that cannot be achieved through perseverance).

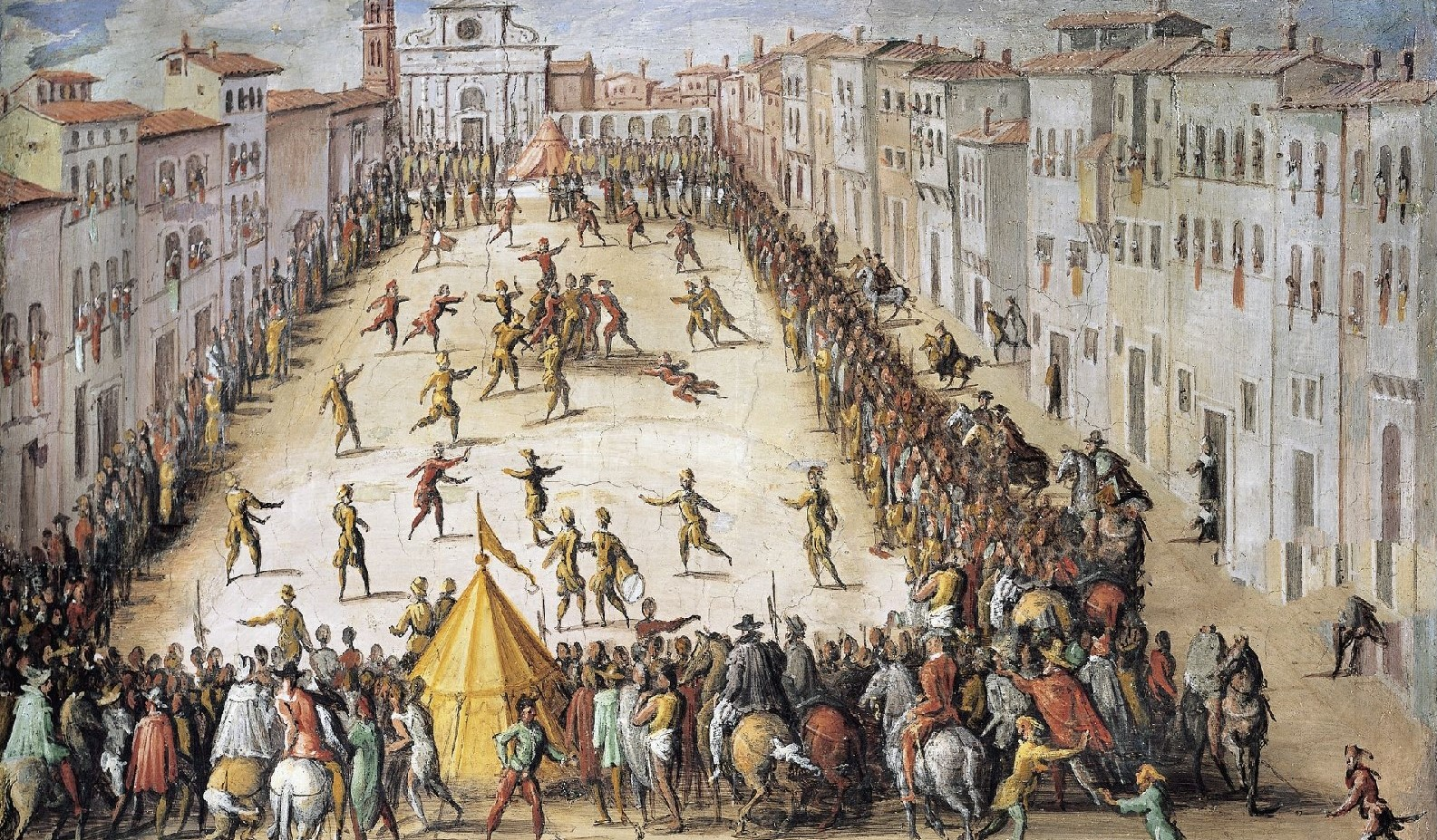
Ball game on the Piazza Santa Maria Novella in Florence

He played an important role in the design and execution of the large commissions for the Medici court the overall direction of which was in the hands of Vasari. His key task was to translate the sketches by Vasari into finished designs, which in turn were used to produce the cartoons for the final painted work. It is clear from the preserved drawings of Stradanus that he regularly participated in the initial development of the compositions. Sixteen finished studies for compositions by Stradanus have been discovered. These designs are executed in pen and ink, embellished by abundant wash. In his use of wash to outline the figures Stradanus distinguished himself from his Flemish masters who preferred the use of a pen for such work. In his style and technique Stradanus combined his Flemish training with Italian techniques. He emphasized the pictorial qualities in his drawings.

=== Paintings ===
Stradanus produced large altarpieces for the most important Florentine churches. His monumental religious panels still hang in the Santa Croce, Santissima Annunziata, Santa Maria Novelia and Santo Spirito. Stradanus' talent as a fresco painter is visible in the murals he created in the Palazzo Vecchio. This ducal palace, which was designed under the direction of Giorgio Vasari, was given a complete decoration with frescoes according to an extensive and complex iconographic program developed by Vasari. Stradanus made a fundamental contribution to the detailed designs of the fresco's, which were then executed by him and workshop assistants. In recognition of his important contribution his portrait was placed alongside that of Vasari on the ceiling of the Salone dei Cinquecento, the majestic reception room of the Palazzo.

In style, composition and technique, the work of Stradanus is entirely in line with that of Vasari and his workshop. He used the elaborate and complex compositions with an overly emphatic display of virtuosity in the postures and twists of the human body. His use of color was also in line with the development of what is later known as Florentine Mannerism: brighter and with greater emphasis on light-dark effects than the previous generations. There is little evidence of any influence of the Flemish painting traditions during this period, probably also because Giorgio Vasari had a firm grip on the program of the palace's decorations. His work is characterised by its high technical quality and the accuracy of his painting.

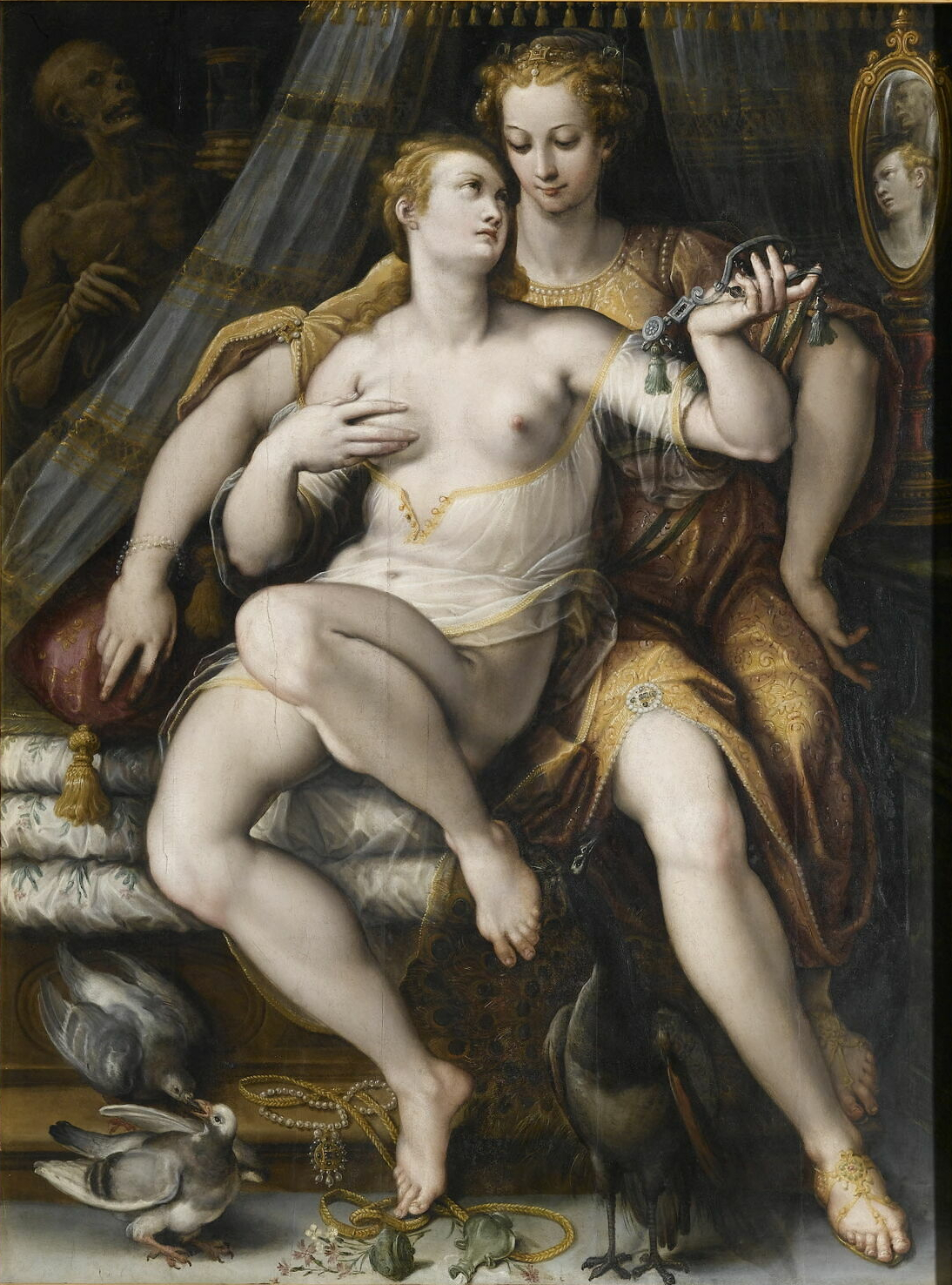
Moderation disarming Vanity

=== Tapestries ===
While it is believed that Stradanus was active as designer of tapestries in Italy upon his arrival in the early 1550s, his first recorded designs were carried out for the Arazzeria Medicea, the personal weaving workshop of the Grand Duke Cosimo I de' Medici. He was paid in 1559 for the cartoons for a series of three tapestries on the Story of Saturn, the original designs of which were made by Vasari. These tapestries were intended for the Terrazo di Saturno in the Palazzo Vecchio. Stradanus changed the original designs of Vasari for the series.

In 1559 Stradanus designed the cartoons on the theme of the Life of Man for the Quartiere di Leonora in the Palazzo Vecchio. The series was completed in 1565 and only four tapestries survive. Stradanus further designed cartoons for a six-piece series of Roman women (realised in 1562–1564), a series of four on the Story of Esther and Ahasuerus (realised in 1562–1564) and a six piece series of the Story of Ulysses (realised in 1563–1565) for the Sala di Penelope. Stradanus designed cartoons for a series of four on the Story of David for the Quartiere di Cosimo (realised in 1561–1562), a four piece series of the Story of Solomon (realised in 1564–1565), two sets of the Story of Cyrus comprising 13 tapestries (realised in 1565–1567) and two more series of the Story of David. He further provided designs for cartoons for a series of tapestries on the History of the Medici for the Quartiere di Leone X (realised in 1569–1574).

Cosimo wanted to decorate his outdoor villa in Poggio a Caiano with tapestries. Stradanus developed a decorative project with hunting scenes divided in three categories: hunts for four-legged animals, animals in the air and animals in the water. The designs were inspired by contemporary sources, the classical literature of Pliny, Homer and Herodotus, as well as the hunting practices at the Florentine court. The designs were received with great acclaim. Stradanus completed 28 cartoons for the series, which was woven between 1566 and 1577. The designs for these tapestries were later published as prints by printers in Antwerp such as Philip Galle and other international publishing houses.

=== Prints ===
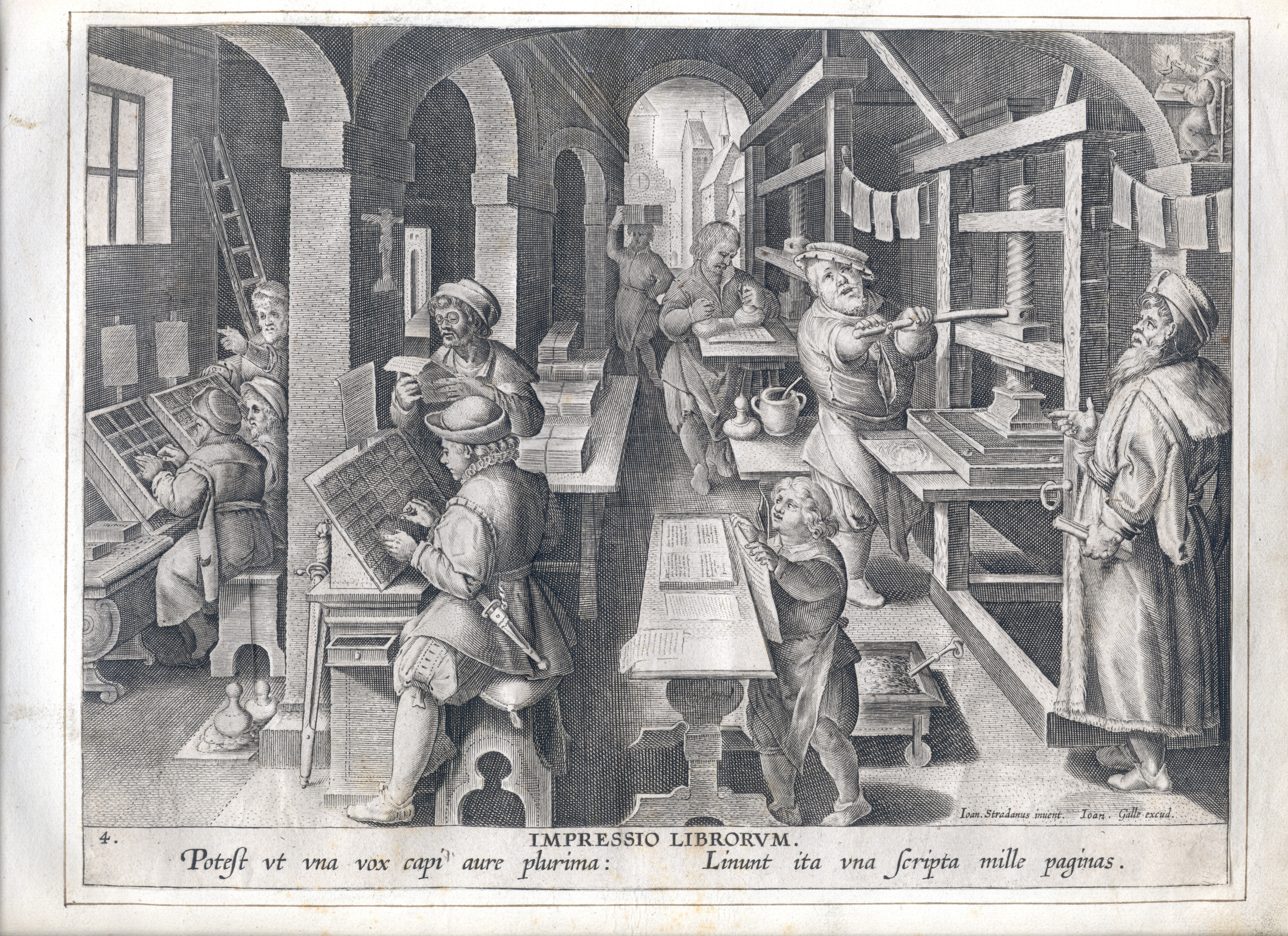
The invention of printing from the Nova reperta, c. 1590

Stradanus became interested in working for the printers in the 1570s in particular after his visit to Antwerp in 1578. Initially, he provided existing designs he had created for his paintings and tapestries to the publishers to be turned into prints. The Antwerp publisher Hieronymus Cock published in 1570 a series of prints after Stradanus' designs for the tapestries of hunting scenes he made for the Grand Duke of Tuscany Cosimo I de' Medici. From 1576 the design of prints became one of the principal activities of Stradanus. He later worked with Philip Galle as his main publisher, likely as a result of meeting with Galle in Antwerp during his visit in 1578. Stradanus' virtuoso drawings were engraved by some of the leading engravers of the second half of the sixteenth century, among them Hendrick Goltzius, Philip Galle and his sons Theodoor and Cornelis, Hans Collaert and his sons Adriaen and Jan, and members of the Sadeler family and the Wierix brothers.

The subjects of the prints were wide-ranging and were in the first place geared towards the demand on the international market for prints that was supplied by the Antwerp printers. After the take-over by Antwerp by the Catholics, the preference was for Counter-Reformation themes such as the two Passion cycles, series on the life of the Virgin and the life of St. John the Baptist, the Acts of the Apostles, two series of the Resurrection of Christ and countless loose devotional prints that Stradanus designed.

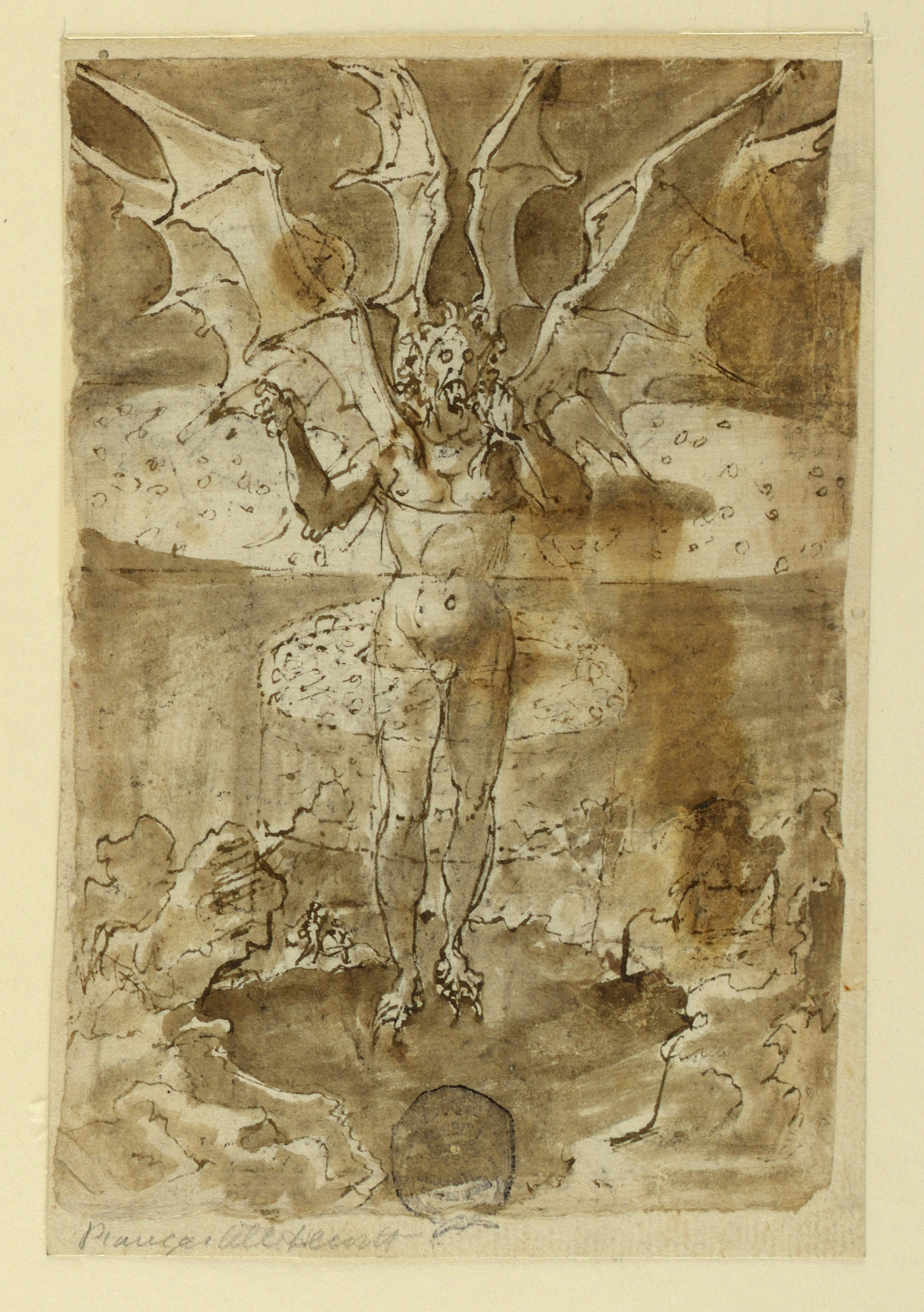
Lucifer Appearing to Dante and Virgil

In addition, Stradanus drew inspiration for subjects from the Florentine intellectual and literary climate in which he lived. Important were his contacts with the exiled Florentine writer and scholar Luigi Alamanni and other members of the Alamanni family who are mentioned in various commissions and dedications to prints. Luigi Alamanni likely inspired Stradanus to illustrate the entire Divina Commedia. Stradanus made a number of drawings for this project which was never completed. Only one of these drawings, depicting Canto 34 of Hell, where Dante and Vergilius look at Lucifer in the center of the Earth, was engraved by Philip Galle. Other themes that tie in with similar intellectual interest are the Nova reperta, depicting inventions of the modern era ending with a print showing an active printshop and the Americae retectio, a so-called 'picture atlas', issued in leaflet form to commemorate the first centenary of the discovery of the New World. It has been argued that the two prints in the Nova reperta series on America of which one shows Amerigo Vespucci's first encounter with the New World and the four symbolic prints making up the Americae retectio series were aimed at showing the presumed important role played by Florence in the discovery of America as Vespucci was a Florentine. The prints and their allegorical symbols were disseminated widely through the next century and informed the contemporary perception of America. He also designed a series depicting the Horses of the Stable of John of Austria and the Illustrious acts of Roman women.

In yet another genre of print designs, aimed at a wider audience, Stradanus referred back to the subjects which he had elaborated as a court artist to the Medici court in his designs of tapestries and frescoes in the Palazzo Vecchio: a series that recounts the history and production of silk, an extensive series on the military triumphs of the Medici and a series depicting hunts of various animals published under the title Venationes Ferarum, Avium, Piscium. While some of the hunts in the last series are depicted in a relatively realistic manner, such as the dramatic rendering of horsemen with lances trying to kill a lion that fiercely resists, other hunts seem rather unrealistic such as the print showing leopards being caught with the help of mirrors. One of his most famous loose prints was the Allegory of the arts engraved by Cornelis Cort in 1578.
