= Cornelis Galle the Elder =

Belgian printmaker

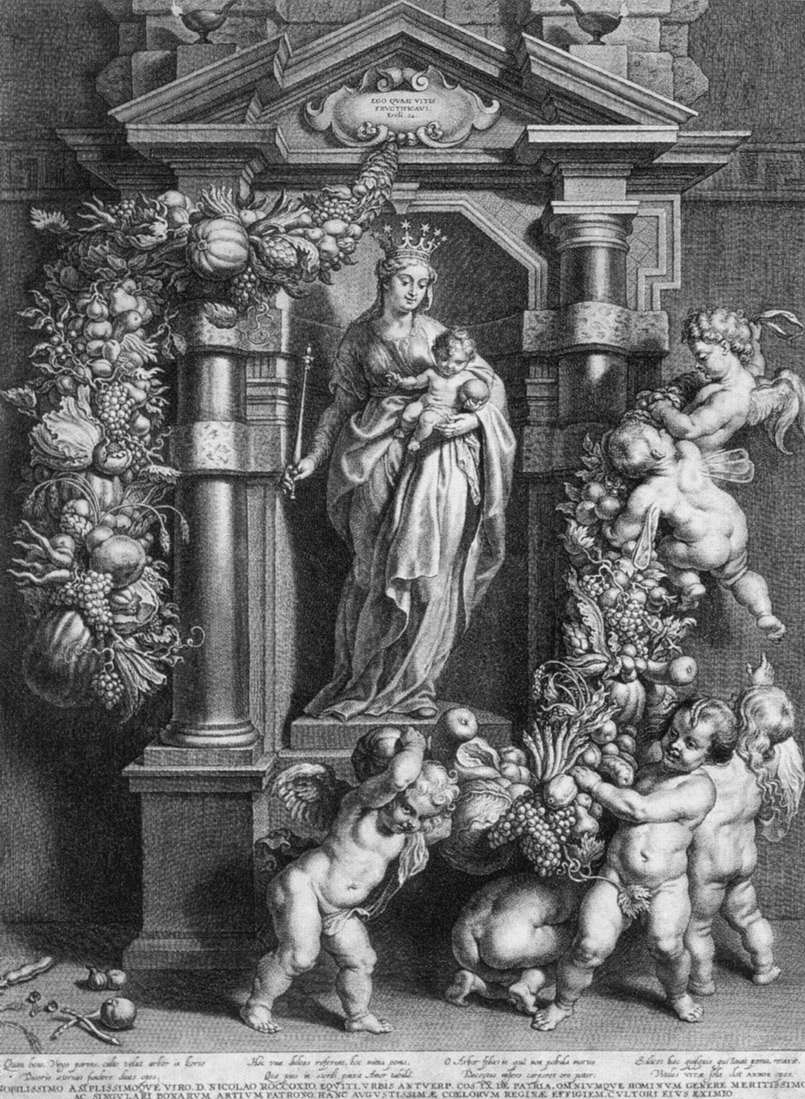
Mary Queen of Heaven

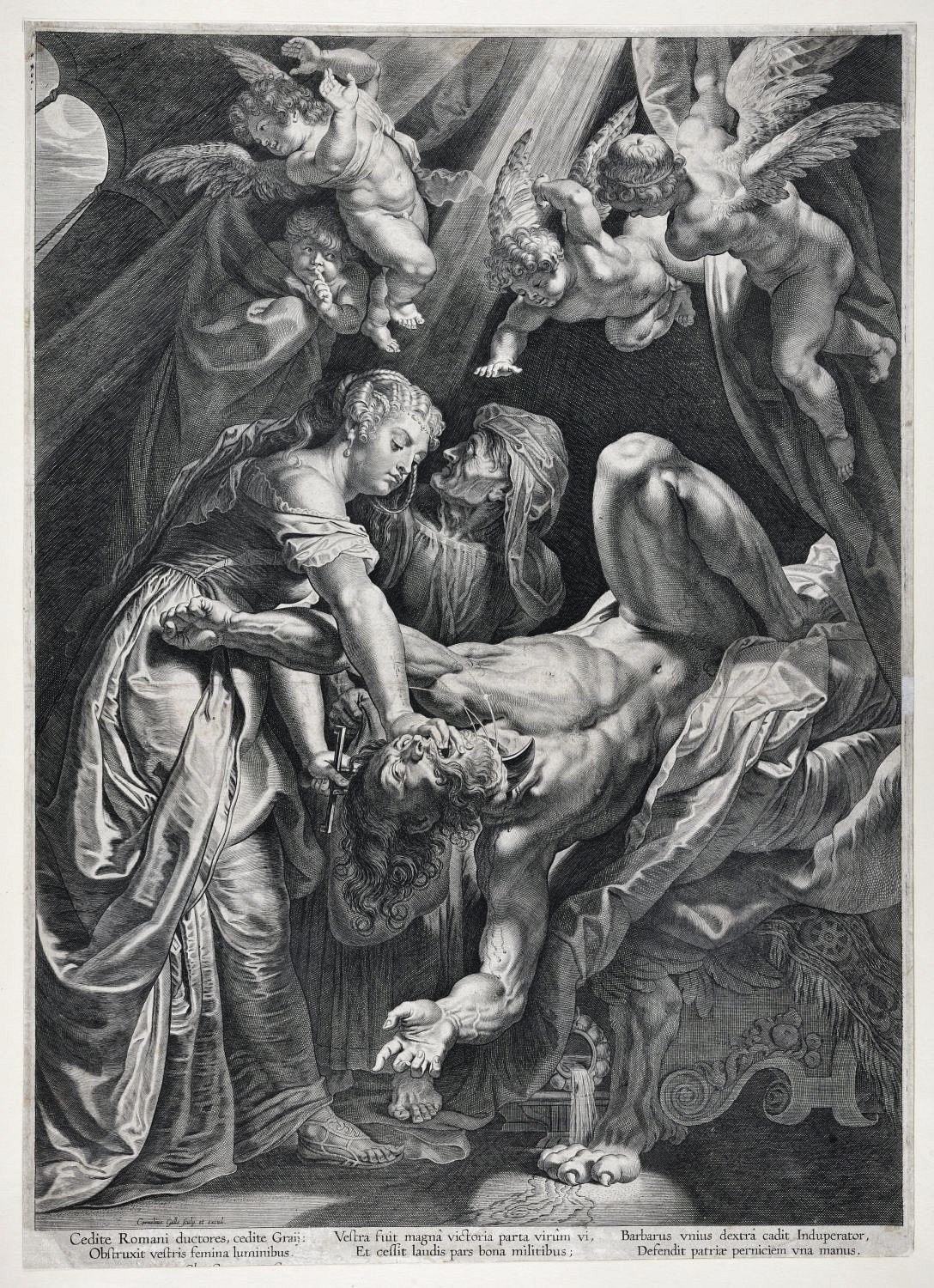
Judith beheading Holofernes (ca. 1610), by Cornelis Galle the Elder after Peter Paul Rubens - Warsaw University Library.

Cornelis Galle the Elder (1576 – 29 March 1650), a younger son of Philip Galle, was born at Antwerp in 1576, and was taught engraving by his father. He followed the example of his brother Theodoor in visiting Rome, where he resided for several years and acquired a correctness of design and a freedom of execution in which he greatly surpassed both his father and his brother. After engraving several plates at Rome, he returned to Antwerp, where he carried on the business of a printseller and engraved many plates after the works of his countrymen and his own designs. He became a master of the Antwerp Guild of St Luke in 1610. One of his pupils was Giovanni Florimi of Siena.

Prior to his visit to Italy, he engraved some plates in the dry, stiff style of his father, of which the best known are:

- A part of the plates of the Life of Christ; after Marten de Vos
- A set of plates of the Life of the Virgin Mary; after Stradan
- A set of plates of the Life of St. John the Baptist; after the same

The following are the most esteemed of his later prints:

== Portraits ==
- St. Charles Borromeo, Cardinal Archbishop of Milan
- Philip Rubens, the brother of Peter Paul Rubens
- Ferdinand III; after Van Dyck
- Jan van Havre; after Rubens
- Charles I, King of England; in an allegorical border; after Van der Horst
- Henrietta Maria, Queen of Charles I; with a border of flowers and figures; after the same
- Leopold William, Archduke of Austria; after W. van de Velde
- Artus Wolfart, painter; after Van Dyck
- Jan Wiggers; after H. De Smet.
- Isabella of Arenberg; after Ch. Wautier
- Johannes de Falckenberg; after Van der Horst
- Abraham Ortelius; after H. Goltzius

== Subjects after various masters ==
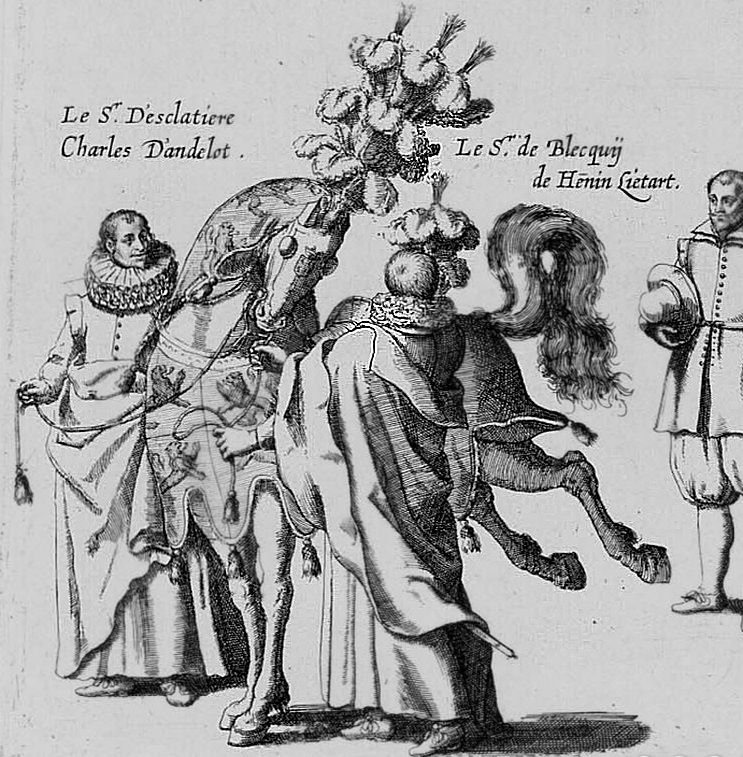
Pompa Funebris Albert VII

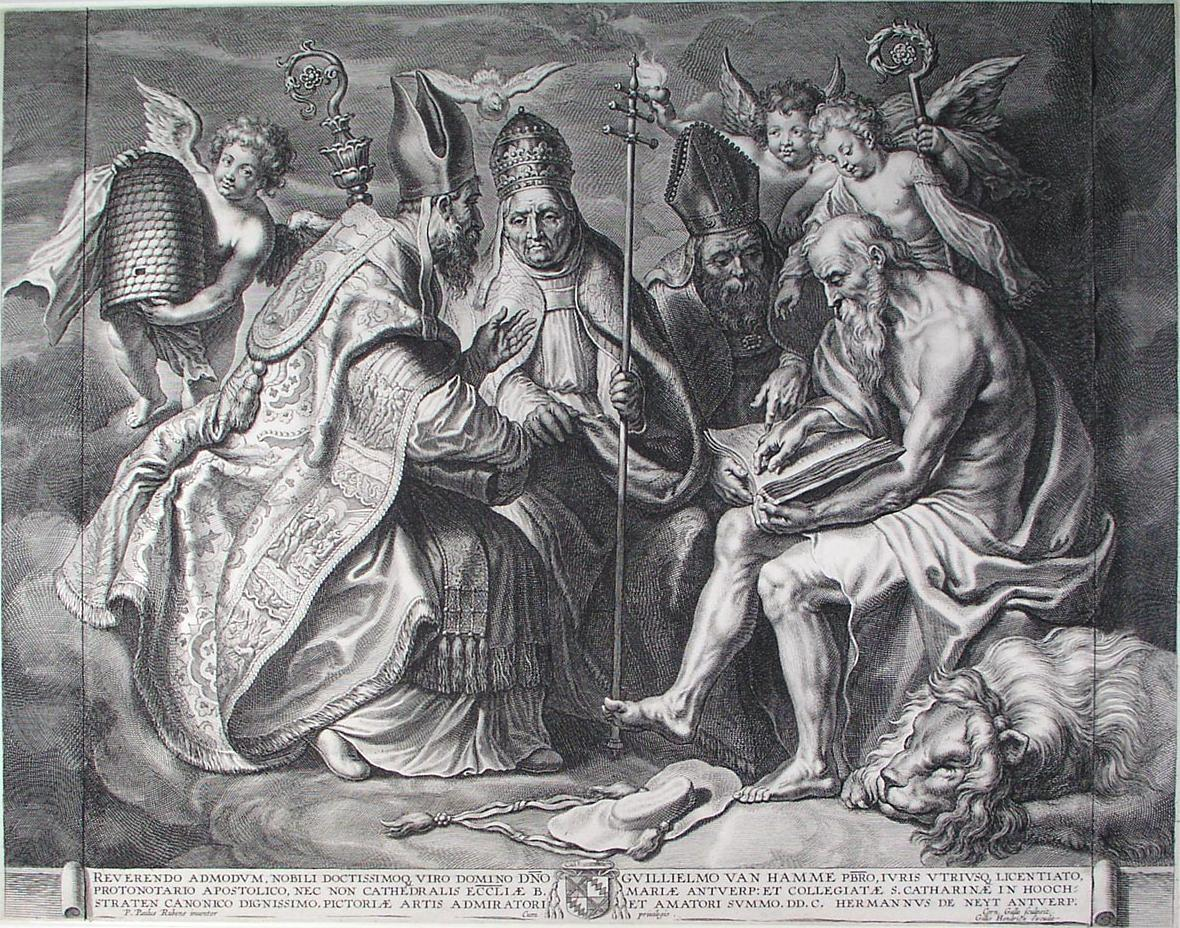
The Four Fathers of the Church, after Rubens

- Adam and Eve; after Giov. Batt. Paggi
- The Holy Family returning from Egypt, with a Choir of Angels; after the same
- Venus caressing Cupid; after the same
- St. Peter baptizing St. Priscia; after the same
- The Virgin and Infant, to whom St. Bernard is offering a Book; after Francesco Vanni
- The Crucifixion, with the Virgin, St. Francis, and St. Theresa; after the same
- Venus bound to a Tree, and Minerva chastising Cupid; after Agostino Carracci
- Procne showing the Head of her son Itys to her husband Tereus; after the same
- Seneca in the Bath; after the same
- The Virgin caressing the Infant Jesus; after Raphael
- The Entombment of Christ; after the same
- The Virgin Mary, under an arch, ornamented with flowers by Angels; after Rubens
- Judith cutting off the Head of Holofernes; after the same
- The Four Fathers of the Church; after the same
- A naked Woman grinding colours; after the same
- Autumn and Winter; two landscapes; after the same
- A Banquet, with Musicians; without the name of the painter
