= Amerigo Vespucci =

Italian explorer and navigator (1454–1512)

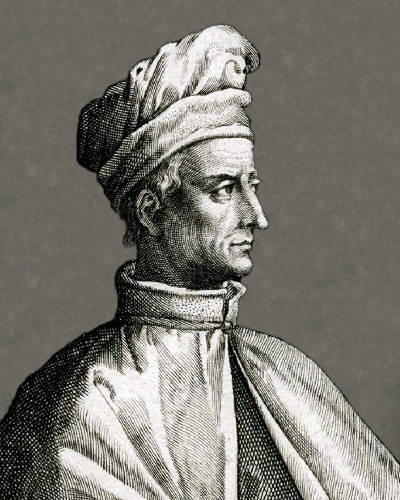
- Portrait attrib. Crispijn van de Passe the Elder, c. 1590–1637
- Born: 9 March 1454; Florence, Republic of Florence
- Died: 22 February 1512 (aged 57); Seville, Crown of Castile
- Other names: Américo Vespucio (Spanish); Americus Vespucius (Latin); Américo Vespúcio (Portuguese)
- Citizenship: Republic of Florence; Crown of Castile (since 1508)
- Occupations: Merchant; explorer; cartographer
- Known for: Demonstrating to Europeans that the New World was not Asia but a previously unknown fourth continent, (Note: Europeans had long conceptualized the Afro-Eurasian landmass as divided into the same three continents known today: Europe, Asia, and Africa. When cosmographers realized that the New World was not connected to the Old (but before it was fully mapped), they considered the Americas a single, fourth continent.) after whom the Americas are named.
- Relatives: Agostino Vespucci (cousin); Simonetta Vespucci (cousin-in-law); Catalina de Medrano (niece-in-law)

Amerigo Vespucci (Note: Pronounced /vɛˈspuːtʃi/ vesp-OO-chee, Italian: [ameˈriːɡo veˈsputtʃi]) (9 March 1454 – 22 February 1512) was an Italian (Note: Though the modern state of Italy had yet to be established, the Latin equivalent of the term Italian had been in use for natives of the region since antiquity) explorer and navigator from the Republic of Florence after whom the Americas are named.

Vespucci participated in at least two voyages of the Age of Discovery between 1497 and 1504, first on behalf of Spain (1499–1500) and then for Portugal (1501–1502). In 1503 and 1505, two booklets were published under his name containing colourful descriptions of these explorations and other voyages. Both publications were extremely popular and widely read throughout much of Europe. Historians still dispute the authorship and veracity of these accounts, but they were instrumental in raising awareness of the discoveries and enhancing the reputation of Vespucci as an explorer and navigator.

Vespucci claimed to have understood in 1501 that Brazil was part of a fourth continent unknown to Europeans, which he called the "New World" (Mundus Novus). The claim inspired cartographer Martin Waldseemüller to recognize Vespucci's accomplishments in 1507 by applying the Latinized form "America" to a map showing the New World. Other cartographers followed suit, securing the tradition of marking the name "America" on maps of the newly discovered continents. It is unknown whether Vespucci was ever aware of these honours.

In 1505, he was made a subject of Castile by royal decree, and he was appointed to the position of piloto mayor (master navigator) for Spain's Casa de Contratación (House of Trade) in Seville in 1508, a post which he held until his death in 1512.

== Early life and education ==
Vespucci was born on 9 March 1454 in Florence, a wealthy Italian city-state and a center of Renaissance art and learning.

Coats of arms of the House of Vespucci

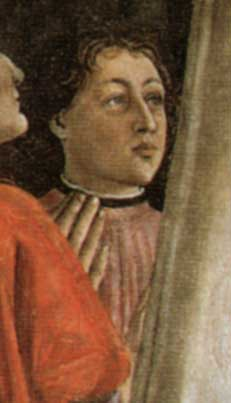
Portrait of a young member of the Vespucci family, identified as Amerigo by Giorgio Vasari

Amerigo Vespucci was the third son of Nastagio Vespucci, a Florentine notary for the Money-Changers Guild, and Lisa di Giovanni Mini. The family resided in the District of Santa Lucia d'Ognissanti along with other families of the Vespucci clan. Earlier generations of Vespucci had funded a family chapel in the Ognissanti church, and the nearby Hospital of San Giovanni di Dio was founded by Simone di Piero Vespucci in 1380. Vespucci's immediate family was not especially prosperous but they were politically well-connected. Amerigo's grandfather, also named Amerigo Vespucci, served a total of 36 years as the chancellor of the Florentine government, known as the Signoria; and Nastagio also served in the Signoria and in other guild offices. More importantly, the Vespuccis had good relations with Lorenzo de' Medici, the powerful de facto ruler of Florence.

Amerigo's two older brothers, Antonio and Girolamo, were sent to the University of Pisa for their education; Antonio followed his father to become a notary, while Girolamo entered the Church and joined the Knights Hospitaller in Rhodes. Amerigo's career path seemed less certain; instead of following his brothers to the university, he remained in Florence and was tutored by his uncle, Giorgio Antonio Vespucci, a Dominican friar in the monastery of San Marco. Fortunately for Amerigo, his uncle was one of the most celebrated humanist scholars in Florence at the time and provided him with a broad education in literature, philosophy, rhetoric, and Latin. He was also introduced to geography and astronomy, subjects that played an essential part in his career. Amerigo's later writings demonstrated a familiarity with the work of the classic Greek cosmographers, Ptolemy and Strabo, and the more recent work of Florentine astronomer Paolo dal Pozzo Toscanelli.

== Early career ==
In 1478, Guido Antonio Vespucci, Amerigo's other uncle, led a Florentine diplomatic mission to Paris and invited his younger cousin, Amerigo Vespucci, to join him. Amerigo's role is not clear, but it was likely as an attache or private secretary. Along the way they had business in Bologna, Milan, and Lyon. Their objective in Paris was to obtain French support for Florence's war with Naples. Louis XI was noncommittal and the diplomatic mission returned to Florence in 1481 with little to show for their efforts.

After his return from Paris, Amerigo worked for a time with his father and continued his studies in science. In 1482, when his father died, Amerigo went to work for Lorenzo di Pierfrancesco de' Medici, head of a junior branch of the Medici family. Although Amerigo was twelve years older, they had been schoolmates under the tutelage of Giorgio Antonio Vespucci. Amerigo served first as a household manager and then gradually took on increasing responsibilities, handling various business dealings for the family both at home and abroad. Meanwhile, he continued to show an interest in geography, at one point buying an expensive map made by the master cartographer Gabriel de Vallseca.

== Seville ==
In 1488, Lorenzo di Pierfrancesco became dissatisfied with his Seville business agent, Tomasso Capponi. He dispatched Vespucci to investigate the situation and provide an assessment of a suggested replacement, Florentine merchant Gianotto Berardi. Vespucci's findings have been lost but Capponi returned to Florence around this time and Berardi took over the Medici business in Seville. In addition to managing Medici's trade in Seville, Berardi had his own business in African slavery and ship chandlery.

By 1492, Vespucci had settled permanently in Seville. His motivations for leaving Florence are unclear; he continued to transact some business on behalf of his Medici patrons but more and more he became involved with Berardi's other activities, most notably his support of Christopher Columbus's voyages. Berardi invested half a million maravedis in Columbus's first voyage, and he won a potentially lucrative contract to provision Columbus's large second fleet. However, profits proved to be elusive. In 1495, Berardi signed a contract with the crown to send 12 resupply ships to Hispaniola but then died unexpectedly in December without completing the terms of the contract.

Vespucci was the executor of Berardi's will, collecting debts and paying outstanding obligations for the firm. Afterwards he was left owing 140,000 maravedis. He continued to provision ships bound for the West Indies, but his opportunities were diminishing; Columbus's expeditions were not providing the hoped-for profits, and his patron, Lorenzo di Pierfrancesco Medici, was using other Florentine agents for his business in Seville.

Sometime after he settled in Seville, Vespucci married a Spanish woman, María Cerezo. Very little is known about her; Vespucci's will refers to her as the daughter of celebrated military leader Gonzalo Fernández de Córdoba. Historian Fernández-Armesto speculates that she may have been Gonzalo's illegitimate offspring and a connection that would have been very useful to Vespucci. She was an active participant in his business and held power of attorney for Vespucci when he was away.

== Voyages and alleged voyages ==
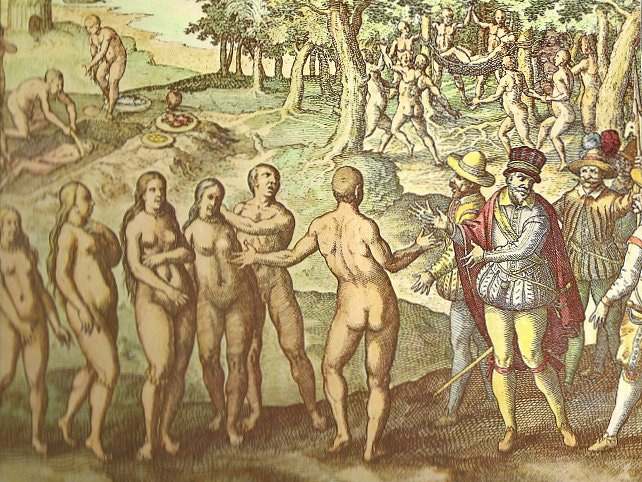
Depiction of Vespucci's first encounter with Native Americans, alleged to have occurred in 1497 (De Bry engraving, c. 1592)

The evidence for Vespucci's voyages of exploration consists almost entirely of a handful of letters written by him or attributed to him. Historians have differed sharply on the authorship, accuracy and veracity of these documents. Consequently, opinions also vary widely regarding the number of voyages undertaken, their routes, and Vespucci's roles and accomplishments. Starting in the late 1490s Vespucci participated in two voyages to the New World that are relatively well-documented in the historical record. Two others have been alleged but the evidence is more problematic. Traditionally, Vespucci's voyages are referred to as the "first" through "fourth", even by historians who dismiss one or more of the trips.

=== Alleged voyage of 1497–1498 ===
A letter, addressed to Florentine official Piero Soderini, dated 1504 and published the following year, purports to be an account by Vespucci of a voyage to the New World, departing from Spain on 10 May 1497, and returning on 15 October 1498. This is perhaps the most controversial of Vespucci's voyages, as this letter is the only known record of its occurrence, and many historians doubt that it took place as described. Some question the authorship and accuracy of the letter and consider it to be a forgery. Others point to the inconsistencies in the narrative of the voyage, particularly the alleged course, starting near Honduras and proceeding northwest for 870 leagues (about 5,130 km or 3,190 mi)—a course that would have taken them across Mexico to the Pacific Ocean.

Certain earlier historians, including contemporary Bartolomé de las Casas, suspected that Vespucci incorporated observations from a later voyage into a fictitious account of this supposed first one, so as to gain primacy over Columbus and position himself as the first European explorer to encounter the mainland. Others, including scholar Alberto Magnaghi, have suggested that the Soderini letter was not written by Vespucci at all, but rather by an unknown author who had access to the navigator's private letters to Lorenzo de' Medici about his 1499 and 1501 expeditions to the Americas, which make no mention of a 1497 voyage. The Soderini letter is one of two attributed to Vespucci that were edited and widely circulated during his lifetime.

=== Voyage of 1499–1500 ===
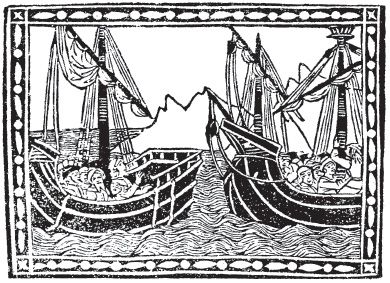
Vespucci's second voyage depicted in the first known edition of his letter to Piero Soderini, published by Pietro Pacini in Florence c. 1505

In 1499, Vespucci joined an expedition licensed by Spain and led by Alonso de Ojeda as fleet commander and Juan de la Cosa as chief navigator. Their intention was to explore the coast of a new landmass found by Columbus on his third voyage and in particular investigate a rich source of pearls that Columbus had reported. Vespucci and his backers financed two of the four ships in the small fleet. His role on the voyage is not clear. Writing later about his experience, Vespucci gave the impression that he had a leadership role, but that is unlikely, due to his inexperience. Instead, he may have served as a commercial representative on behalf of the fleet's investors. Years later, Ojeda recalled that "Morigo Vespuche" was one of his pilots on the expedition.

The vessels left Spain on 18 May 1499 and stopped first in the Canary Islands before reaching South America somewhere near present-day Suriname or French Guiana. From there the fleet split up: Ojeda proceeded northwest toward modern Venezuela with two ships, while the other pair headed south with Vespucci aboard. The only record of the southbound journey comes from Vespucci himself. He assumed they were on the coast of Asia and hoped by heading south they would, according to the Greek geographer Ptolemy, round the unidentified "Cape of Cattigara" and reach the Indian Ocean. They passed two huge rivers (the Amazon and the Para) which poured freshwater 25 miles (40 km) out to sea. They continued south for another 40 leagues (about 240 km or 150 mi) before encountering a very strong adverse current which they could not overcome. Forced to turn around, the ships headed north, retracing their course to the original landfall. From there Vespucci continued up the South American coast to the Gulf of Paria and along the shore of what is now Venezuela. At some point they may have rejoined Ojeda but the evidence is unclear. In the late summer, they decided to head north for the Spanish colony at Hispaniola in the West Indies to resupply and repair their ships before heading home. After Hispaniola they made a brief slave raid in the Bahamas, capturing 232 Lucayans, and then returned to Spain.

=== Voyage of 1501–1502 ===
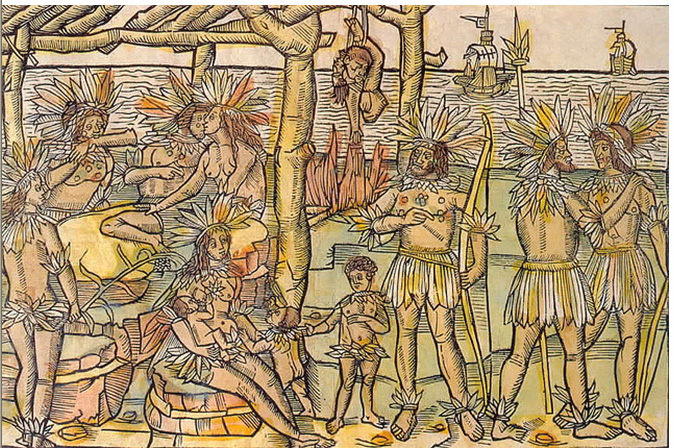
First known depiction of cannibalism in the New World. Engraving by Johann Froschauer for an edition of Vespucci's Mundus Novus published in Augsburg in 1505

In 1501, Manuel I of Portugal commissioned an expedition to investigate a landmass far to the west in the Atlantic Ocean encountered unexpectedly by a wayward Pedro Álvares Cabral on his voyage around Africa to India. That land would eventually become present-day Brazil. The king wanted to know the extent of this new discovery and determine where it lay in relation to the line established by the Treaty of Tordesillas. Any land that lay to the east of the line could be claimed by Portugal. Vespucci's reputation as an explorer and presumed navigator had already reached Portugal, and he was hired by the king to serve as pilot under the command of Gonçalo Coelho.

Coelho's fleet of three ships left Lisbon in May 1501. Before crossing the Atlantic they resupplied at Cape Verde, where they encountered Cabral on his way home from his voyage to India. This was the same expedition that had found Brazil on its outward-bound journey the previous year. Coelho left Cape Verde in June, and from this point Vespucci's account is the only surviving record of their explorations. On 17 August 1501 the expedition reached Brazil at a latitude of about 6° south. Upon landing it encountered a hostile band of natives who killed and ate one of its crewmen. Sailing south along the coast they found friendlier natives and were able to engage in some minor trading. At 23° S they found a bay which they named Rio de Janeiro because it was 1 January 1502. On 13 February 1502, they left the coast to return home. Vespucci estimated their latitude at 32° S but experts now estimate they were closer to 25° S. Their homeward journey is unclear since Vespucci left a confusing record of astronomical observations and distances travelled.

=== Alleged voyage of 1503–1504 ===
In 1503, Vespucci may have participated in a second expedition for the Portuguese crown, again exploring the east coast of Brazil. There is evidence that a voyage was led by Coelho at about this time but no independent confirmation that Vespucci took part. The only source for this last voyage is the Soderini letter; but several modern scholars dispute Vespucci's authorship of that letter and it is uncertain whether Vespucci undertook this trip. There are also difficulties with the reported dates and details in the account of this voyage.

== Return to Seville ==
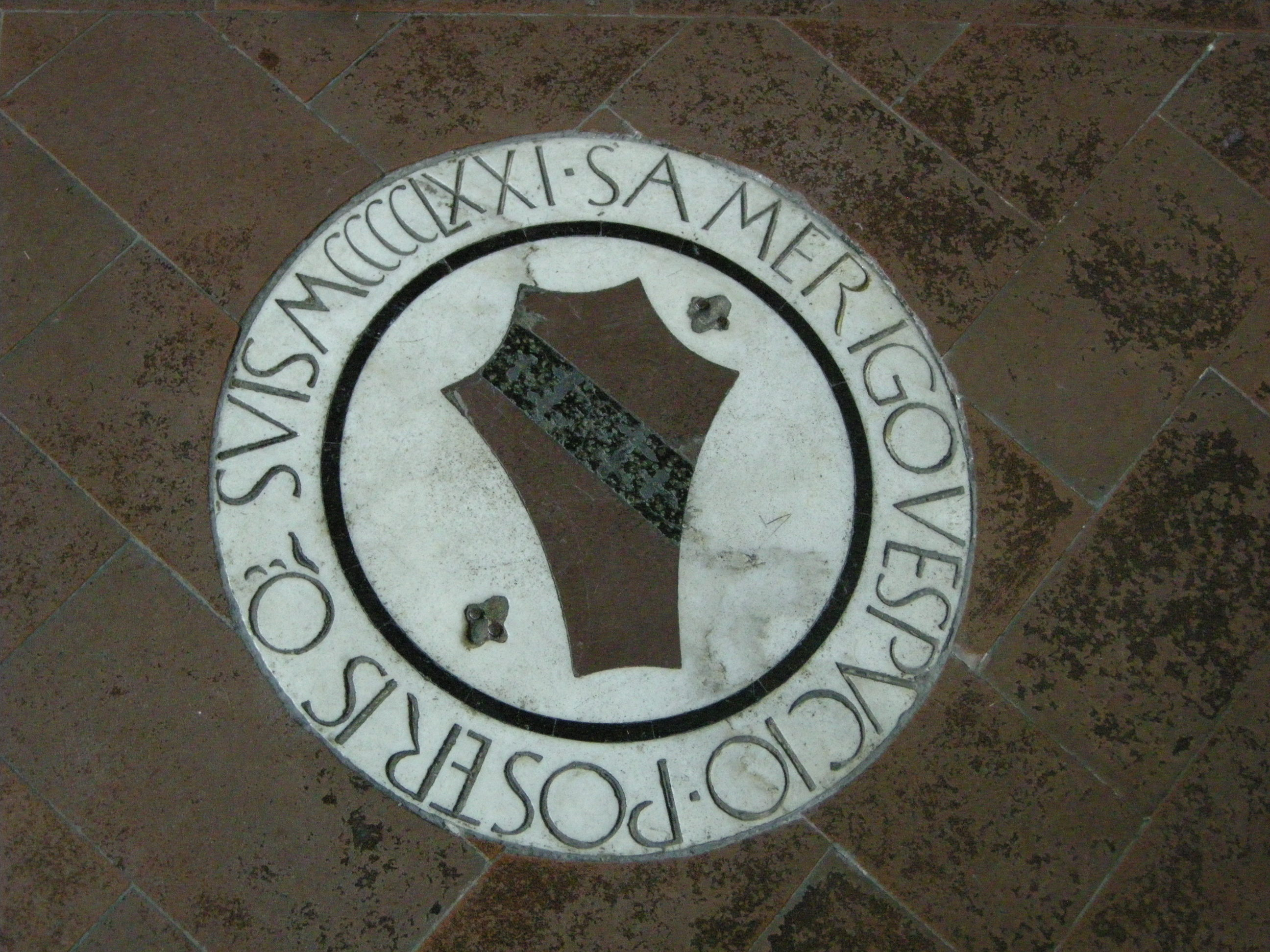
Tomb of the Vespucci family in Ognissanti, Florence

By early 1505, Vespucci was back in Seville. His reputation as an explorer and navigator continued to grow and his recent service in Portugal did not seem to damage his standing with King Ferdinand. On the contrary, the king was likely interested in learning about the possibility of a western passage to India. In February, he was summoned by the king to consult on matters of navigation. During the next few months he received payments from the crown for his services and in April he was declared by royal proclamation a citizen of Castile and León.

From 1505 until his death in 1512, Vespucci remained in service to the Spanish crown. He continued his work as a chandler, supplying ships bound for the Indies. He was also hired to captain a ship as part of a fleet bound for the "spice islands" but the planned voyage never took place. In March 1508, he was named chief pilot for the Casa de Contratación or House of Commerce which served as a central trading house for Spain's overseas possessions. He was paid an annual salary of 50,000 maravedis with an extra 25,000 for expenses. In his new role, Vespucci was responsible for ensuring that ships' pilots were adequately trained and licensed before sailing to the New World. He was also charged with compiling a "model map", the Padrón Real, based on input from pilots who were obligated to share what they learned after each voyage.

Vespucci wrote his will in April 1511. He left most of his modest estate, including five household slaves, to his wife. His clothes, books, and navigational equipment were left to his nephew Giovanni Vespucci. He requested to be buried in a Franciscan habit in his wife's family tomb. Vespucci died on 22 February 1512.

Upon his death, Vespucci's wife was awarded an annual pension of 10,000 maravedis to be deducted from the salary of the successor chief pilot. His nephew Giovanni was hired into the Casa de Contratación where he spent his subsequent years spying on behalf of the Florentine state.

== Naming of America ==
"On a former occasion I wrote to you at some length concerning my return from those new regions which we found and explored with the fleet, at the cost, and by the command of this Most Serene King of Portugal. And these we may rightly call a new world. Because our ancestors had no knowledge of them, and it will be a matter wholly new to all those who hear about them."

— Amerigo Vespucci, Mundus Novus, Letter to Lorenzo di Pierfrancesco de' Medici (1502/1503)

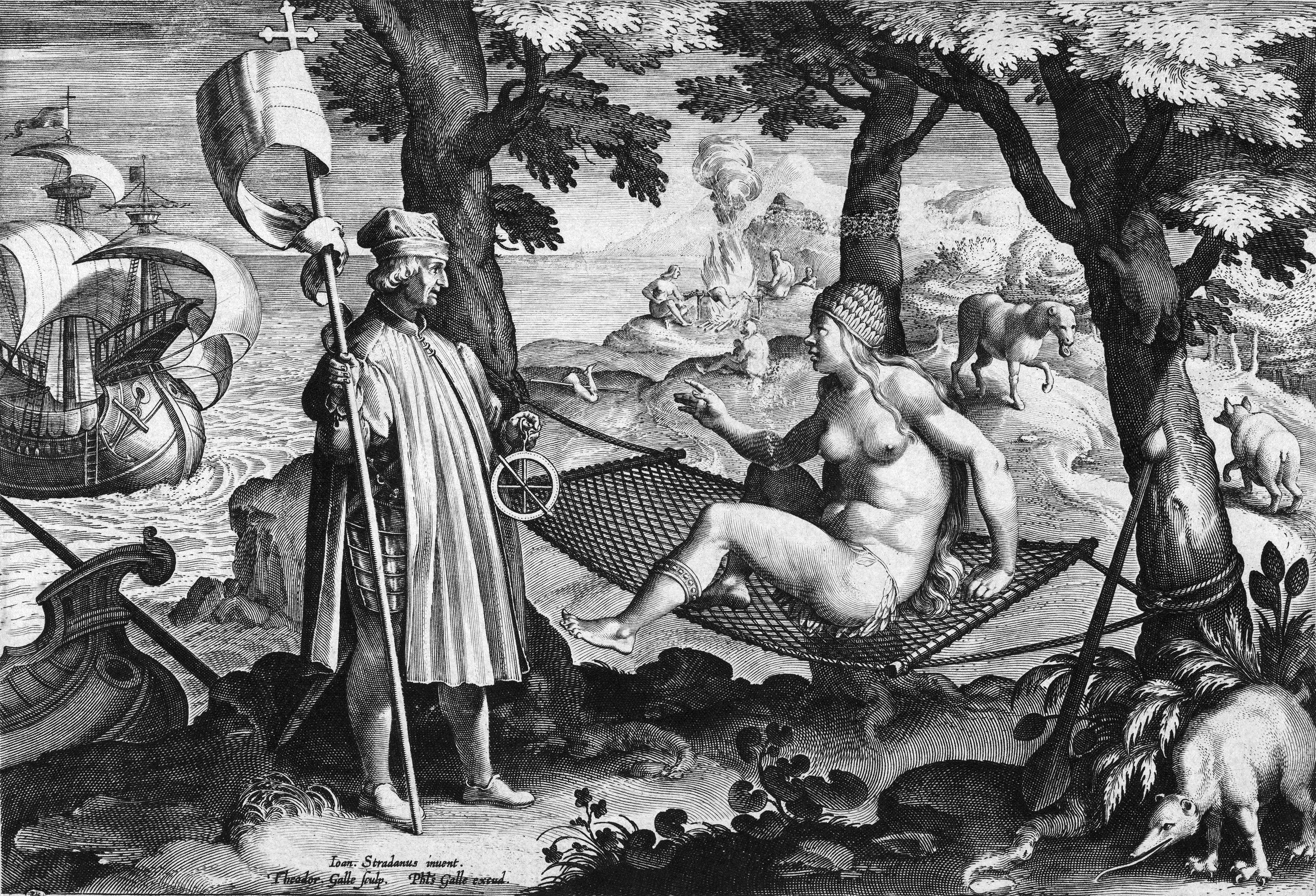
Allegory of the New World by Stradanus, depicting Vespucci that awakens the sleeping America

Vespucci's voyages became widely known in Europe after two accounts attributed to him were published between 1503 and 1505. The Soderini letter (1505) came to the attention of a group of humanist scholars studying geography in Saint-Dié, a small French town in the Duchy of Lorraine. Led by Walter Lud, the academy included Matthias Ringmann and Martin Waldseemüller. In 1506, they obtained a French translation of the Soderini letter as well as a Portuguese maritime map that detailed the coast of lands recently discovered in the western Atlantic. They surmised that this was the "new world" or the "antipodes" hypothesized by classical writers. The Soderini letter gave Vespucci credit for discovery of this new continent and implied that the Portuguese map was based on his explorations.

In April 1507, Ringmann and Waldseemüller published their Introduction to Cosmography with an accompanying world map. The Introduction was written in Latin and included a Latin translation of the Soderini letter. In a preface to the Letter, Ringmann wrote

I see no reason why anyone could properly disapprove of a name derived from that of Amerigo, the discoverer, a man of sagacious genius. A suitable form would be Amerige, meaning Land of Amerigo, or America, since Europe and Asia have received women's names.

A thousand copies of the world map were printed with the title Universal Geography According to the Tradition of Ptolemy and the Contributions of Amerigo Vespucci and Others. It was decorated with prominent portraits of Ptolemy and Vespucci and, for the first time, the name America was applied to a map of the New World.

The Introduction and map were a great success and four editions were printed in the first year alone. The map was widely used in universities and was influential among cartographers who admired the craftsmanship that went into its creation. In the following years, other maps were printed that often incorporated the name America. In 1538, Gerardus Mercator used America to name both the North and South continents on his influential map. By this point the tradition of marking the name "America" on maps of the New World was secure.

In 1513 Waldseemüller published a new map with the New World labelled "Terra Incognita" instead of "America", and the accompanying text names Columbus as discoverer. Many supporters of Columbus felt that Vespucci had stolen an honour that rightfully belonged to Columbus. Most historians now believe that Vespucci was unaware of Waldseemüller's map before his death in 1512 and many assert that he was not even the author of the Soderini letter.

== Vespucci letters ==
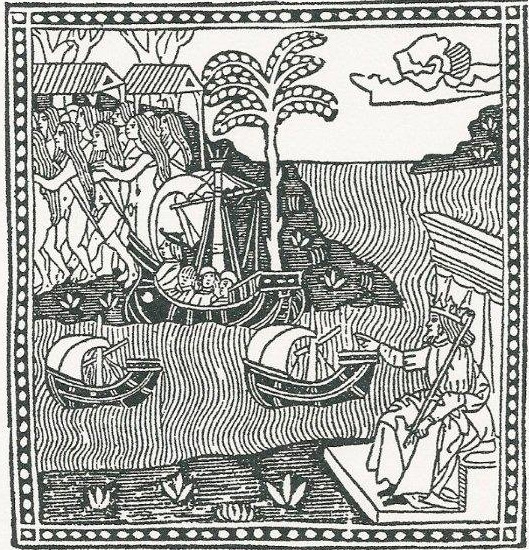
Woodcut depicting Vespucci's first voyage to the New World, from the first known published edition of his 1504 letter to Piero Soderini

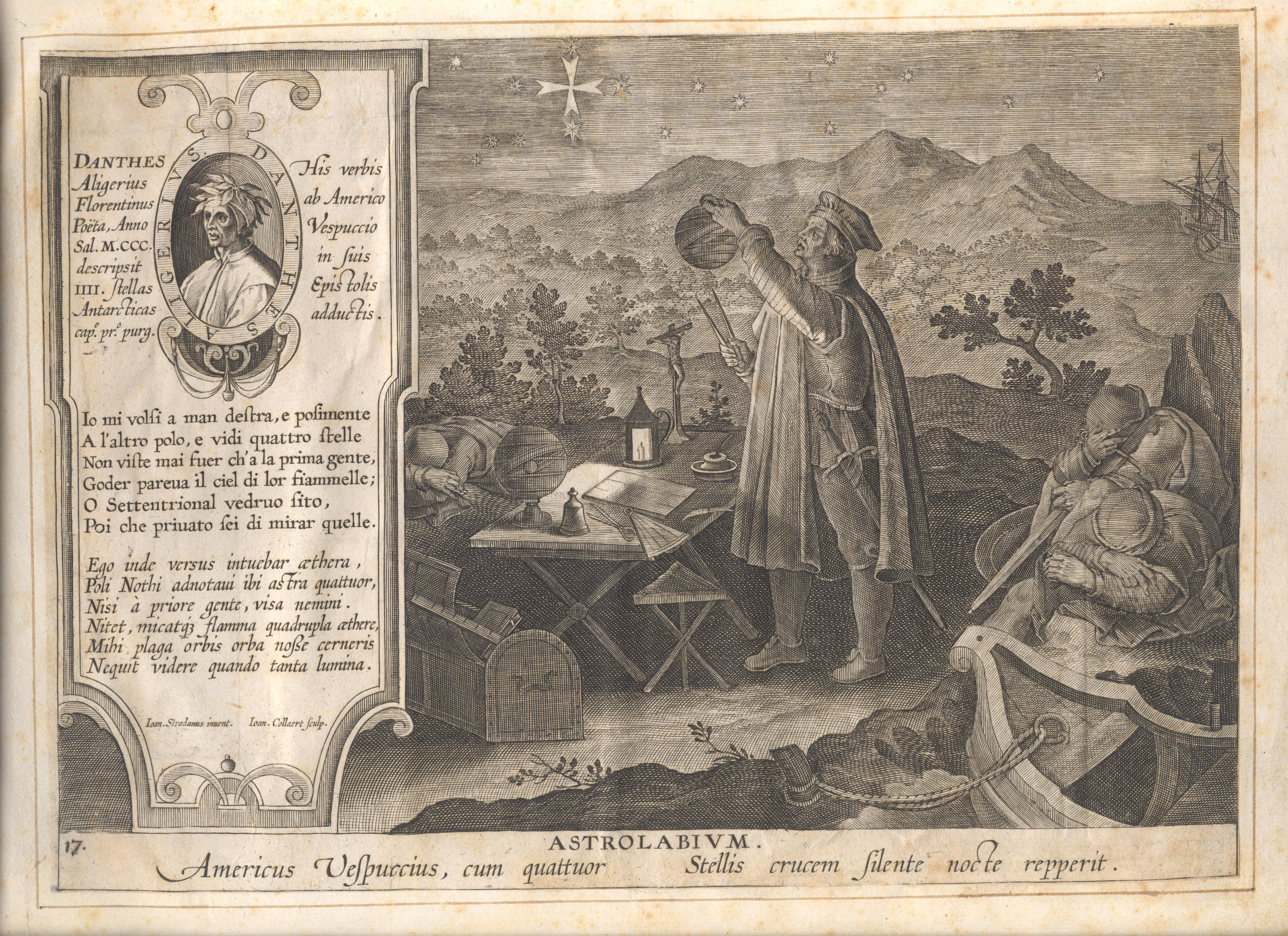
Vespucci observing the constellation Crux with an astrolabe during his 1499 voyage, event described in his Letter to Lorenzo di Pierfrancesco de' Medici. Print includes Vespucci's own allusion to a relevant passage in Dante's Purgatorio.

Knowledge of Vespucci's voyages relies almost entirely on a handful of letters written by him or attributed to him. Two of these letters were published during his lifetime and received widespread attention throughout Europe. Several scholars now believe that Vespucci did not write the two published letters in the form in which they circulated during his lifetime. They suggest that they were fabrications based in part on genuine Vespucci letters.

Mundus Novus (1503) was a letter written to Vespucci's former schoolmate and one-time patron, Lorenzo di Pierfrancesco de' Medici. Originally published in Latin, the letter described his voyage to Brazil in 1501–1502 serving under the Portuguese flag. The document proved to be extremely popular throughout Europe. Within a year of publication, twelve editions were printed including translations into Italian, French, German, Dutch and other languages. By 1550, at least 50 editions had been issued.

Letter to Soderini (1505) was a letter ostensibly intended for Piero di Tommaso Soderini, the leader of the Florentine Republic. It was written in Italian and published in Florence around 1505. It is more sensational in tone than the other letters and the only one to assert that Vespucci made four voyages of exploration. The authorship and the veracity of the letter have been widely questioned by modern historians. Nevertheless, this document was the original inspiration for naming the American continent in honour of Amerigo Vespucci.

The remaining documents were unpublished manuscripts; handwritten letters uncovered by researchers more than 250 years after Vespucci's death. After years of controversy, the authenticity of the three complete letters was convincingly demonstrated by Alberto Magnaghi in 1924. Most historians now accept them as the work of Vespucci but aspects of the accounts are still disputed.

Letter from Seville (1500) describes a voyage made in 1499–1500 while in the service of Spain. It was first published in 1745 by Angelo Maria Bandini.

Letter from Cape Verde (1501) was written in Cape Verde at the outset of a voyage undertaken for Portugal in 1501–1502. It was first published by Count Baldelli Boni in 1807. It describes the first leg of the journey from Lisbon to Cape Verde and provides details about Pedro Cabral's voyage to India which were obtained when the two fleets met by chance while anchored in the harbour at Cape Verde.

Letter from Lisbon (1502) is essentially a continuation of the letter started in Cape Verde. It describes the remainder of a voyage made on behalf of Portugal in 1501–1502. The letter was first published by Francesco Bartolozzi in 1789.

Ridolfi Fragment (1502) is part of a letter attributed to Vespucci but some of its assertions remain controversial. It was first published in 1937 by Roberto Ridolfi. The letter appears to be an argumentative response to questions or objections raised by the unknown recipient. A reference is made to three voyages made by Vespucci, two on behalf of Spain and one for Portugal.

== Historiography ==
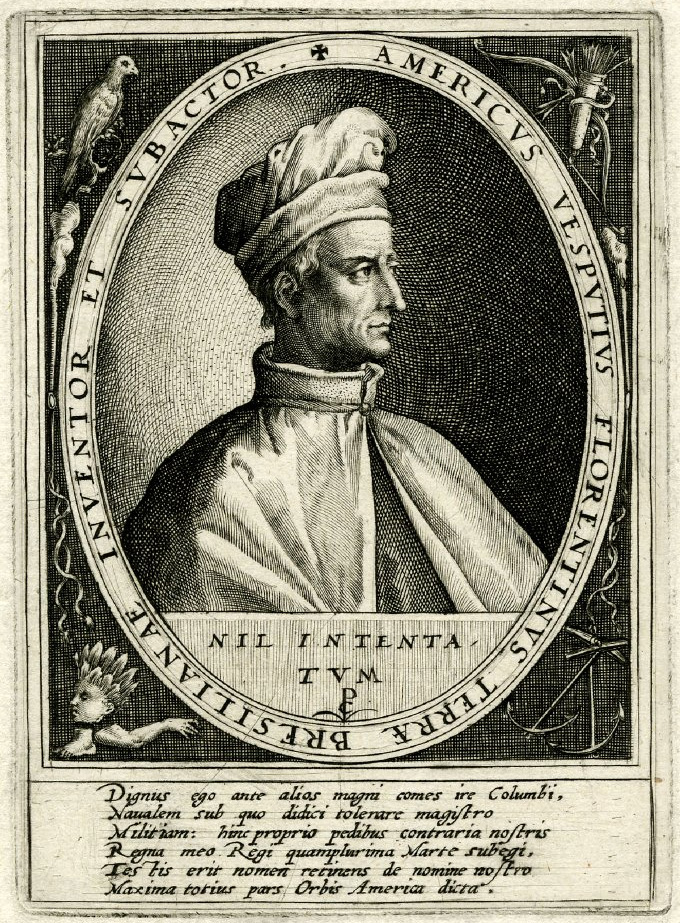
Portrait engraving of Vespucci by Crispijn van de Passe, which titles him "discoverer and conqueror of Brazilian land"

Vespucci has been called "the most enigmatic and controversial figure in early American history". The debate has become known among historians as the "Vespucci question". How many voyages did he make? What was his role on the voyages and what did he learn? The evidence relies almost entirely on a handful of letters attributed to him. Many historians have analysed these documents and have arrived at contradictory conclusions.

In 1515, Sebastian Cabot became one of the first to question Vespucci's accomplishments and express doubts about his 1497 voyage. Later, Bartolomé de las Casas argued that Vespucci was a liar and stole the credit that was due Columbus. By 1600, most regarded Vespucci as an impostor and not worthy of his honours and fame. In 1839, Alexander von Humboldt after careful consideration asserted the 1497 voyage was impossible but accepted the two Portuguese-sponsored voyages. Humboldt also called into question the assertion that Vespucci recognized that he had encountered a new continent. According to Humboldt, Vespucci (and Columbus) died in the belief that they had reached the eastern edge of Asia. Vespucci's reputation was perhaps at its lowest in 1856 when Ralph Waldo Emerson called Vespucci a "thief" and "pickle dealer" from Seville who managed to get "half the world baptized with his dishonest name".

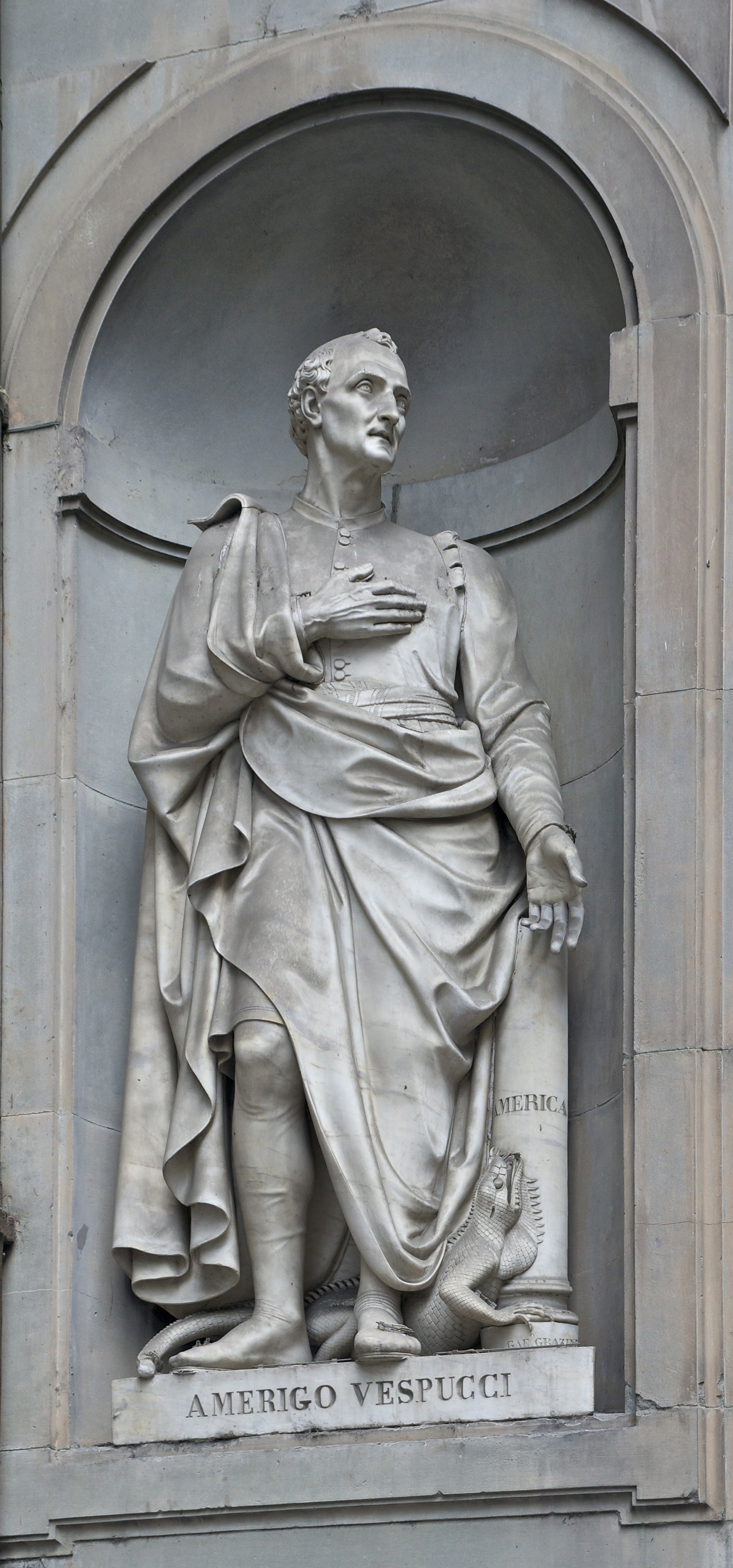
Statue of Vespucci outside the Uffizi in Florence, Italy

Opinions began to shift somewhat after 1857 when Brazilian historian Francisco Adolfo de Varnhagen wrote that everything in the Soderini letter was true. Other historians followed in support of Vespucci including John Fiske and Henry Harrisse.

In 1924, Alberto Magnaghi published the results of his exhaustive review of Vespucci's writings and relevant cartography. He denied Vespucci's authorship of the 1503 Mundus Novus and the 1505 Letter to Soderini, the only two texts published during his lifetime. He suggested that the Soderini letter was not written by Vespucci, but was cobbled together by unscrupulous Florentine publishers who combined several accounts – some from Vespucci, others from elsewhere. Magnaghi determined that the manuscript letters were authentic and based on them he was the first to propose that only the second and third voyages were true, and the first and fourth voyages (only found in the Soderini letter) were fabrications. While Magnaghi has been one of the chief proponents of a two-voyage narrative, Roberto Levellier was an influential Argentinian historian who endorsed the authenticity of all Vespucci's letters and proposed the most extensive itinerary for his four voyages.

Other modern historians and popular writers have taken varying positions on Vespucci's letters and voyages, espousing two, three, or four voyages and supporting or denying the authenticity of his two printed letters. Most authors believe that the three manuscript letters are authentic while the first voyage as described in the Soderini letter draws the most criticism and disbelief.

A two-voyage thesis was accepted and popularized by Frederick J. Pohl (1944), and rejected by Germán Arciniegas (1955), who posited that all four voyages were truthful. Luciano Formisiano (1992) also rejects the Magnaghi thesis (acknowledging that publishers probably tampered with Vespucci's writings) and declares all four voyages genuine, but differs from Arciniegas in details (particularly the first voyage). Samuel Morison (1974) flatly rejected the first voyage but was noncommittal about the two published letters. Felipe Fernández-Armesto (2007) calls the authenticity question "inconclusive" and hypothesizes that the first voyage was probably another version of the second; the third is unassailable, and the fourth is probably true.

== Legacy ==
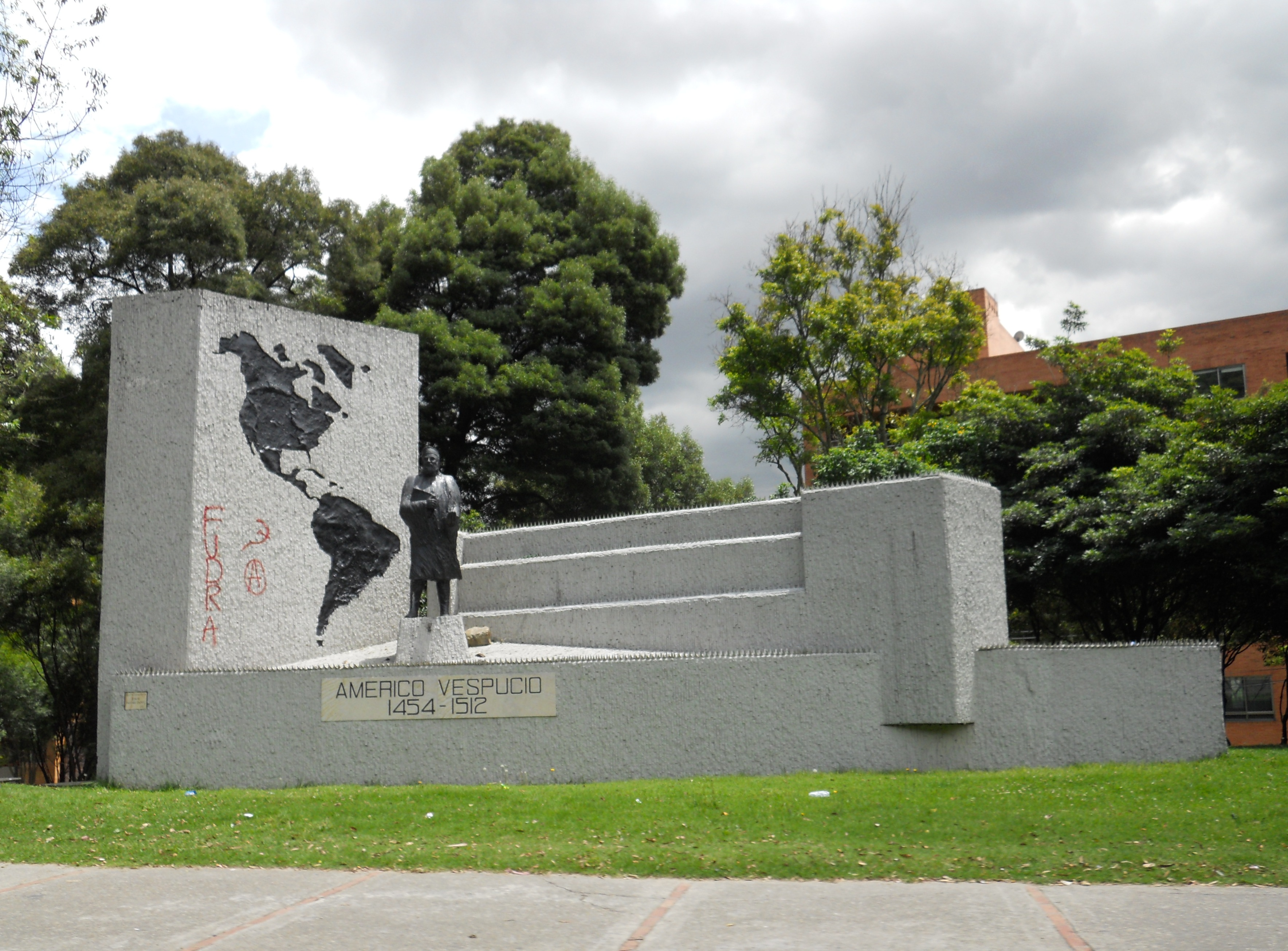
Amerigo Vespucci monument at El Chicó, Colombia

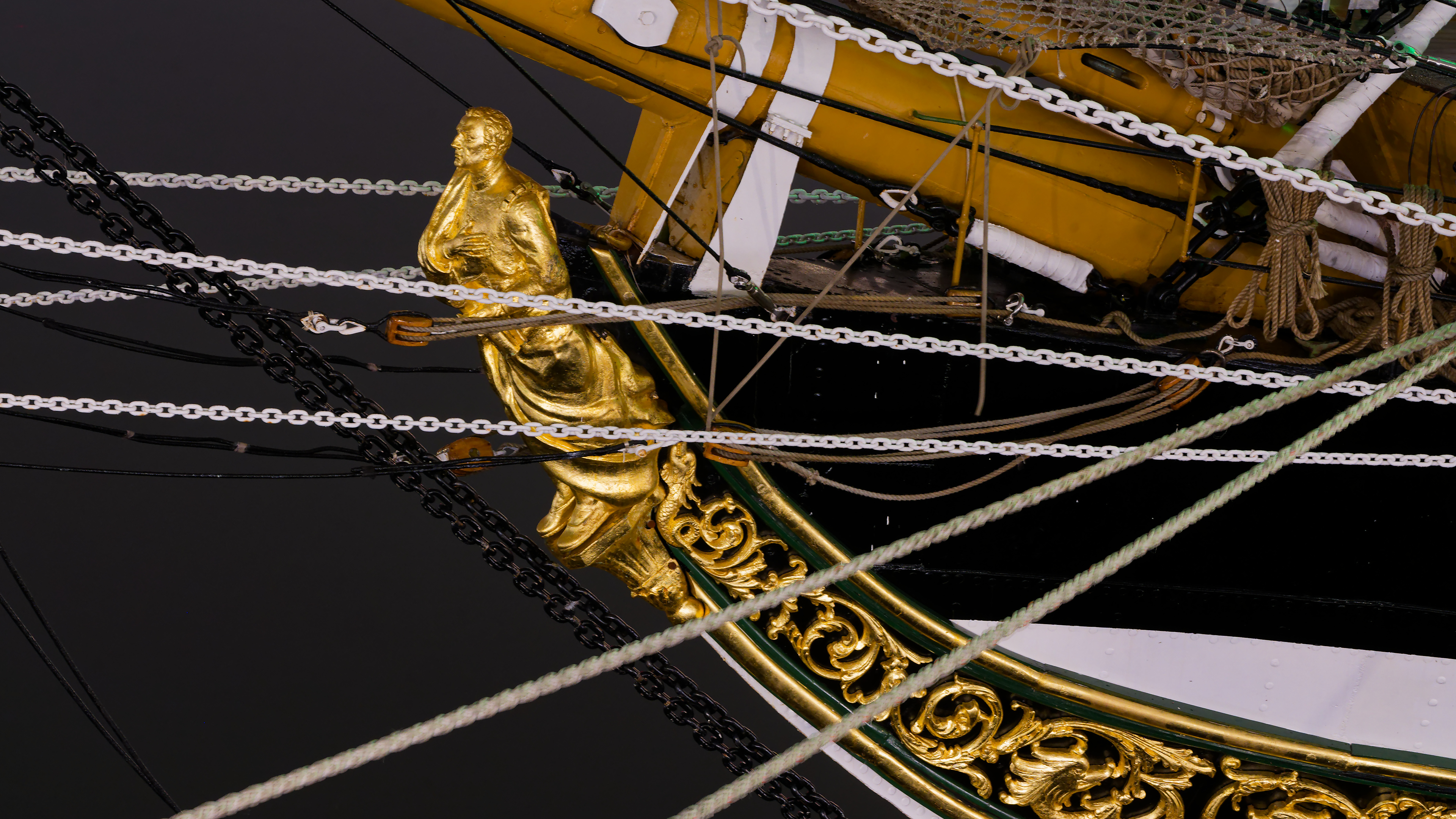
Figurehead of the Italian Amerigo Vespucci sail boat, 1931

Vespucci's historical importance may rest more with his letters (whether or not he wrote them all) than his discoveries. Burckhardt cites the naming of America after him as an example of the immense role of the Italian literature of the time in determining historical memory. Within a few years of the publication of his two letters, the European public became aware of the newly discovered continents of the Americas. According to Vespucci:

Concerning my return from those new regions which we found and explored...we may rightly call a new world. Because our ancestors had no knowledge of them, and it will be a matter wholly new to all those who hear about them, for this transcends the view held by our ancients, inasmuch as most of them hold that there is no continent to the south beyond the equator, but only the sea which they named the Atlantic and if some of them did aver that a continent there was, they denied with abundant argument that it was a habitable land. But that this their opinion is false and utterly opposed to the truth...my last voyage has made manifest; for in those southern parts I have found a continent more densely peopled and abounding in animals than our Europe or Asia or Africa, and, in addition, a climate milder and more delightful than in any other region known to us, as you shall learn in the following account.

Although the term continent is used in the above English translation, Vespucci himself does not use it in either the surviving Italian texts nor is it found in contemporary Latin translations. In his letters, Vespucci refers to the newly discovered lands as a "new world" (novus mundus) or in Italian as "new land" (una nuova terra). In a 1504 letter to Piero Soderini, Vespucci describes the New World as "una nuova terra; & la giudicamo essera terra ferma, & continua con la disposa sta mentione," describing it as a continuous mainland without using the noun continent. George Tyler Northrop's translation of this passage is "a new land; and we judged it to be a continent and adjoining that [of which] mention is made above", introducing the term continent where it was not present in the original text.

== Bibliography ==
- Arciniegas, Germán (1978) [1955]. Amerigo and the New World: The Life and Times of Amerigo Vespucci. Translated by de Onís, Harriet. New York: Alfred A. Knopf. ISBN 0374902801. LCCN 53-9487.
- Beazley, Charles Raymond (1911). "Vespucci, Amerigo" . Encyclopædia Britannica. Vol. 27 (11th ed.). pp. 1053–1054.
- Brinkbaumer, Klaus; Hoges, Clemens (2004). The Voyage of the Vizcaina. Translated by Streck, Annette. Harcourt. pp. 105–109. ISBN 978-0151011865.
- Campbell, Gordon (2005). The Oxford dictionary of the Renaissance. Oxford: Oxford University Press. ISBN 978-0-19-172779-5.
- Diffie, Bailey W.; Winius, George D. (1977). Foundations of the Portuguese Empire 1415–1580. University of Minnesota Press. pp. 456–462.
- Edwards, Charles Lester; Vespucci, Amerigo (2009). Amerigo Vespucci. Viartis. ISBN 978-1906421021.
- Fernández-Armesto, Felipe (2007). Amerigo: The Man Who Gave His Name to America. New York: Random House.
- Formisano, Luciano (1992). Letters from a New World: Amerigo Vespucci's Discovery of America. New York: Marsilio. ISBN 0941419622.
- King, Robert J. (2022). "The Antipodes on Martin Waldseemuller's 1507 World Map". The Globe (91): 43–60. ProQuest 2666975853.
- Lester, Toby (2009). The Fourth Part of the World. New York: Free Press. ISBN 978-1416535317.
- Magnaghi, Alberto (1924). Amerigo Vespucci: Studio critico, con speciale riguardo ad una nuova valutazione delle fonti e con documenti inediti tratti dal Codice Vaglienti. Rome: Treves.
- Markham, Clements R. (2010) [1894]. The Letters of Amerigo Vespucci, and Other Documents Illustrative of His Career. Originally published by The Hakluyt Society, London, in 1894. Cambridge New York: Cambridge Univ. Press. ISBN 978-1108012867.
- Morison, Samuel Eliot (1974). The European Discovery of America: The Southern Voyages, 1492–1616. New York: Oxford University Press. pp. 276–312.
- Ober, Frederick A. (2007) [1907]. Amerigo Vespucci. At least 10 different editions published since 2007 by small independent presses. New York & London: Harper & Brothers. ISBN 978-1503010727.
- Pohl, Frederick J. (1944). Amerigo Vespucci: Pilot Major. New York: Columbia University Press. hdl:2027/mdp.39015003944751.
- Ray, Kurt (2004). Amerigo Vespucci: Italian Explorer of the Americas. New York: The Rosen Publishing Group. ISBN 0823936155.
- Schulz, Norbert; Vespucci, Amerigo (2007). Amerigo Vespucci, Mundus Novus (mit Zweittexten). MMO-Verlag. ISBN 978-3981114423.
- Thomas, Hugh (2003). Rivers of Gold. New York: Random House. pp. 269–276. ISBN 0375502041.
- Vespucci, Amerigo (1504). Mundus Novus: Letter to Lorenzo Pietro Di Medici. Translated by Northup, George Tyler. Princeton: Princeton University Press (published 1916).
- Vigneras, Louis-André (1976). The Discovery of South America and the Andalusian Voyages. Chicago: University of Chicago Press. ISBN 978-0226856094.
