= Amerigo Vespucci Letter from Seville =

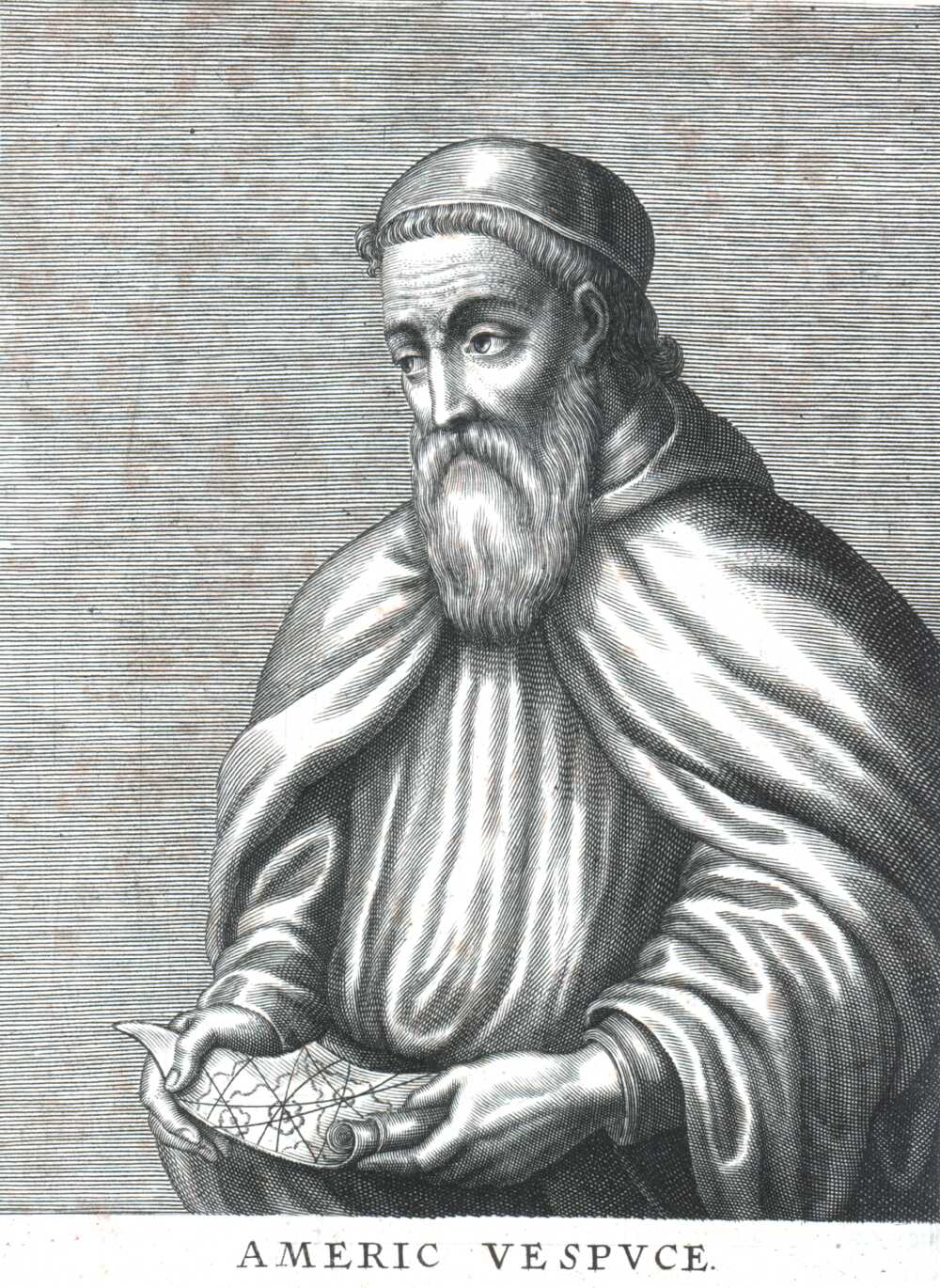
Amerigo Vespucci

Amerigo Vespucci's Letter from Seville (18 July 1500), written to his patron Lorenzo di Pierfrancesco de' Medici, describes experiences on Alonso de Ojeda's May 1499 voyage. Vespucci's findings during the Age of Discovery led Spain people to believe that North and South America were not connected to Asia, which was a common belief at the time and was even held by Vespucci himself. Despite the surrounding controversy among many historians about which Vespucci letters were real, and which ones were forged, this particular letter of Vespucci's is notable for its detailed description of the Brazilian coast and its inhabitants.

== Authenticity of the Letter ==
Antonello Gerbi argues that the 1500 "Letter from Seville", the 4 July 1501 "Letter from Cape Verdi," and the 1502 "Letter from Lisbon," all written to Lorenzo di Pierfrancesco de' Medici, are the only three authentic Vespucci letters.

In 1497, Vespucci sailed with Spain and left Cadiz, Spain on his first journey where he was sailing through the West Indies. In the "Letter from Seville", he wrote that "we sailed for about thirteen hundred leagues to that land from the city of Cadiz" However, the voyage in 1497 was to reach the West Indies instead of Brazil. Vespucci in the letter also wrote "we...discovered a very large country of Asia"

== Synopsis ==
Amerigo Vespucci, a European explorer, sailed for Spain in an effort to explore Asia. By sailing southwest from the Atlantic Ocean, Vespucci and his crew ended up discovering South America, which he initially thought was connected to Asia. Vespucci wrote the “Letter from Seville” in Seville, Spain after finishing his voyage in order to summarize all his discoveries in South America. Vespucci was satisfied with the voyage because he crossed the equator successfully and explored the tropics, which were called the Torrid Zone at that time, and investigated rivers and different plant and animal species.

While Vespucci sailed south in the Atlantic Ocean, he and his crew became lost because of a miscalculation of only a few degrees. It was difficult for them to find the directions in the ocean by sunlight, as the equator had days and nights of equal length. By comparing drawings and the actual locations, they fixed errors on the map. After sailing through the equator, Vespucci was able to disprove the contemporary philosophy that claimed the tropics were inhospitable to life because of the heat. Vespucci learned that the Torrid Zone was more densely populated than the surrounding areas. Vespucci had arrived in Brazil by sailing into the Amazon and Pará rivers, which were connected to the Atlantic Ocean. When Vespucci and his crew sailed into the river, they had a hard time to find a place to dock because they were surrounded by swamps. They encountered various flora and fauna that amazed them. This huge ecosystem made Vespucci call Brazil a “terrestrial paradise.”

The voyage for Vespucci and his crew was also full of interactions with the indigenous people. When they arrived at some locations, they got off the boat with weapons. Vespucci discovered that the indigenous people were naked without shame and stated that they were of “a different nature.” Across all the places Vespucci and his crew explored, they observed that the indigenous people were cannibals. In his letter, Vespucci showed respect by mentioning the fact that the indigenous people only ate enemies and slaves, and never ate women. Some indigenous tribes reacted to the presence of explorers differently than others. Some tribes showed affection by providing food and giving gifts, whereas others were more fearful and hostile. In some situations, the explorers chose to fight and kill the indigenous people and burn down their villages. Besides the encounters with the indigenous people, Vespucci discovered that each tribe they met spoke a different language. This experience had expanded Vespucci's horizon on his perception of language diversity, which he initially thought that “in the world there [were] not more than seventy-seven languages.”

Vespucci and his crew also gained some new items from trade. However, they could not collect huge numbers of the goods because they were on a long voyage and only stopped temporarily. Vespucci and his crew mainly collected brazilwood for dye and cotton.

== Reception ==
Many authors have criticized Letter from Seville as being falsified information, accusing Vespucci of never truly making the voyage to Brazil or over exaggerating his role. Thomas More describes Europe in Utopia: A Revised Translation, Backgrounds, Criticism as fundamentally corrupt, creating a culture in which Vespucci would feel encouraged to recreate experiences heard from others.

Other's place blame on mapmakers and interpreters of Vespucci's time. Felipe Fernández-Armesto describes Vespucci as a common Italian sailor, whose writings were misinterpreted by contemporaries. Fernández-Armesto firmly establishes that only two of the four voyages were factual, of which Vespucci did not command. Fault is moved past him, and unto those who circulated his writings.

Alternatively, Charles Whitney criticizes modern historians for being unable to distinguish between Christopher Columbus and Vespucci, attempting to credit both with discovering the Americas and creating mass misinformation. He argues misconceptions lie within academia, preventing a true understanding of Vespucci's accounts.
