= Giovanni Florimi =

Italian engraver

Giovanni Florimi or Florini was a 17th-century Italian engraver, active in Tuscany.

He was a pupil of the Flemish engraver Cornelis Galle the Elder. He worked at Siena in 1630. His works consist principally of portraits, and among them, that of Francesco Piccolomini, after Francesco Vanni. He also engraved the frontispiece for the book of Concetti Davidici Figurati by the Olivetan abbot P. Orazio Pandolfini, published in Pisa in 1635. He also engraved a portrait of Camillo Borghese, archbishop of Siena, and a picture of the Martyrdom of Saint Cecilia.
