= Ann Florini =

Singaporean academic

Ann Florini is a Fellow in the Political Reform Program at New America; a founding Board Member of the Economics of Mutuality Foundation; a Senior Global Futures Scientist at the Julie Ann Wrigley Global Futures Laboratory, Arizona State University; a Professor of Practice at the Thunderbird School of Global Management NatureFinance and the Task Force on Nature Markets.

== Biography ==
Florini received a Bachelor’s degree from Syracuse University, a Master’s in Public Affairs from Princeton University, and a Ph.D. in Political Science from the University of California, Los Angeles in 1995. She was the founding director of the Centre on Asia and Globalisation at the National University of Singapore from 2006 to 2011.

From 2002, Florini served as a Senior Fellow at the Brookings Institution in Washington, D.C. Earlier in her career, she was a senior associate at the Carnegie Endowment for International Peace and research director of the Rockefeller Brothers Fund Project on World Security. She also contributed to international initiatives such as the Global Governance Initiative for the World Economic Forum (2000–2005) and the International Task Force on Transparency at Columbia University’s Initiative for Policy Dialogue (2000–2005).

Florini was a Professor of Public Policy at Singapore Management University, where she also served as Academic Director of the Masters of Tri-Sector Collaboration program until June 2018.

== Books ==
- "China Experiments: From Local Innovations to National Reforms" (with Hairong Lai and Yeling Tan, Brookings Press 2012)
- The Right to Know: Transparency for an Open World (Columbia University Press, May 2007)
- The Coming Democracy: New Rules for Running a New World (Island Press, 2003/Brookings Press 2005)
- The Third Force: The Rise of Transnational Civil Society (Carnegie Endowment for International Peace/Japan Center for International Exchange, 2000)

== Articles ==
Her peer-reviewed articles include:

- “The Public Roles of the Private Sector in Asia: The Emerging Research Agenda,” Asia and the Pacific Policy Studies January 2014
- (with Karthik Nachiappan, Tikki Pang, and Christine Pilcavage) “Global Health Governance: Analyzing China, India, and Japan as Global Health Aid Donors,” Global Policy vol.3, no. 3 (September 2012), pp. 336–347.
- (with Benjamin K. Sovacool) “Examining the Complications of Global Energy Governance,” Journal of Energy and Natural Resources Law, August 2012.
- (with Navroz K. Dubash) Guest Editors’ Introduction to Special Issue on “Governing Energy in a Fragmented World,” Global Policy 2: S1 (September 2011).
- (with Navroz K. Dubash) “Mapping Global Energy Governance,” Global Policy 2: S1 (September 2011).
- “The International Energy Agency in Global Energy Governance,” Global Policy 2: S1 (September 2011).
- (with Saleena Saleem) “Information Disclosure in Global Energy Governance,” Global Policy 2: S1 (September 2011).
- “Rising Asian Powers and Changing Global Governance,” International Studies Review 13 (Winter 2011), pp. 24–33.
- (with Benjamin K. Sovacool) “Bridging the Gaps in Global Energy Governance,” Global Governance 17:1 (Winter 2011).
- “The National Context for Transparency-based Global Environmental Governance,” Global Environmental Politics, 10:3 (August 2010), pp. 120–131.
- (with Benjamin K. Sovacool) “Who Governs Energy? The Challenges Facing Global Energy Governance,” Energy Policy 37, 2009, pp. 5239–5248.
- “Making Transparency Work,” Global Environmental Politics, 8: 2 (May 2008), pp 14–16.
- “Does the Invisible Hand Need a Transparent Glove?” Proceedings of the 11th Annual World Bank Conference on Development Economics (Washington, DC: The World Bank, 2000).
- “Commercial Satellite Imagery Comes of Age,” Issues in Science and Technology 16:1 (Fall 1999).
- “A New Role for Transparency,” Contemporary Security Policy 18:2 (August 1997). Reprinted in Nancy W. Gallagher, ed., Arms Control: New Approaches to Theory and Policy (London and Portland, OR: Frank Cass, 1998).
- “The Evolution of International Norms,” International Studies Quarterly 40 (Fall 1996).
- “The Opening Skies: Third-Party Imaging Satellites and U.S. Security,” International Security, 13:2 (Fall 1988).
