= Allori =

Allori is a surname. Notable people with the surname include:

- Alessandro Allori (1535–1607), Italian portrait painter
- Angelo Allori (1502–1572), Florentine Mannerist painter
- Cristofano Allori (1577–1621), Italian portrait painter
