= Territorialist School =

The so-called Territorialist School is a contemporary approach to urban and regional planning and design grown out from the work of a number of Italian scholars, among whom Alberto Magnaghi (Torino, 1941, for many years professor and currently professor emeritus at the University of Florence) is the most prominent figure.

Starting from a critique of the sustainable development concept, where both a strictly environmental vision of sustainability and the global quantitative development were challenged, the school has focused on the increasingly important role of local qualitative development and elaborated the concept of “local self-sustainable development”. This concept emphasized the balance between: directing development towards fundamental human requirements (which cannot be reduced to material needs alone); self-reliance and the development of self-government by local society; and enhancing environmental quality.

The Territorialist approach intends to combine these three objectives, according priority to "place-consciousness", i.e. a reflexive relation with local identity and heritage (with reference to the themes of bio-regionalism dealt with by Patrick Geddes), viewed as the strategic keys for a sustainable future. The definition of ‘heritage’ adopted by this school is an extensive one, identifying each ‘territorio’ both with its people and places, and including environment, landscape, urban features, local knowledge, culture and crafts in its unique character as a living entity.

This type of approach stresses the increasingly important role of the territory itself when tackling the problems of sustainability, and consequently assumes the arts and crafts of producing territorial quality as a key element for lasting wealth.

== Methodology ==
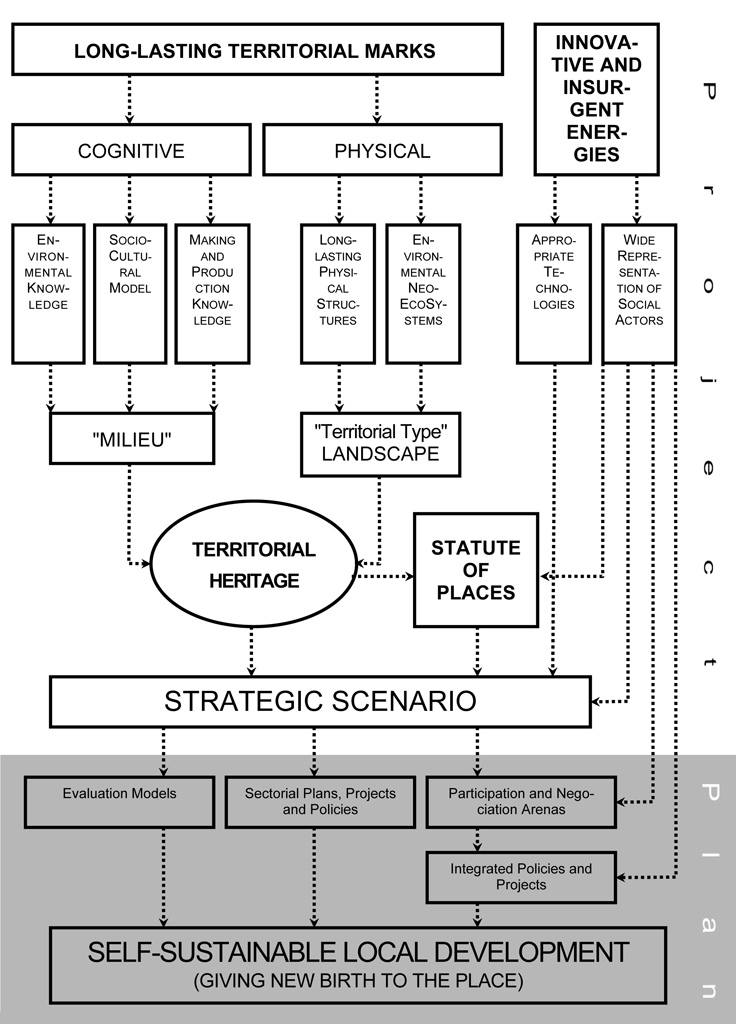

A planning process scheme for local self-sustainable development: the "hydraulic" scheme by Alberto Magnaghi.

== Main international References ==
- Magnaghi, Alberto, The Urban Village: A Charter for Democracy and Local Self-sustainable Development, Zed Books, London and New York 2005
- Goldsmith, Edward, “Preface” to Alberto Magnaghi’s The Urban Village
- Magnaghi, Alberto, Le projet local, Pierre Mardaga, Sprimont 2003
- Magnaghi, Alberto, La Biorégion Urbaine. Petit Traité sur le Territoire Bien Commun, Eterotopia France, Paris 2014
- Magnaghi, Alberto, La Conscience du Lieu, Eterotopia France, Paris 2017
- Poli, Daniela, Formes et Figures du Projet Local. La Patrimonialisation Contemporaine du Territoire, Eterotopia France, Paris 2018
- Small, Mike, “Universalism and the Genius Loci: Geddes in Cyprus, Italy, Catalonia and Japan”, in W. Stephen, A Vigorous Institution: The Living Lefacy of Patrick Geddes, Luath Press, Edinburgh 2007
- Jongerden, Joost, “The Urban Village: Territorialization of Sustainable Development”, Tailoring Biotechnologies, n. 2 2006
- Magnaghi, Alberto, “A Green Core for the Polycentric Urban Region of Central Tuscany and the Arno Master Plan”, in ISoCaRP Review 02, Cities between Integration and Disintegration: opportunities and challenges, ISoCaRP, Sitges 2006
- Magnaghi, Alberto, "Local Utopia: Towards a Fair and Non-hierarchical Bottom-up Globalization" in ISoCaRP, Planning in a more Globalized and Competitive World, ed. by Paolo La Greca, Gangemi, Rome 2005
- Magnaghi, Alberto, "Local self-sustainable Development: Subjects of Transformation", Tailoring Bio-technologies, n.1 2005
- Choay, Françoise, "Utopia and the Anthropological Foundation of Built Space", in van Schaik, Martin, Máčel, Otakar (eds.), Exit Utopia. Architectural Provocations 1956-76, IHAAU-TU - Prestel, Munich/Berlin/London/New-York 2005
- Magnaghi, Alberto, "The Local Proiect: Summing up a Political Vision", in Paloscia, Raffaele (ed.), The Contested Metropolis. Six Cities at the Beginning of the 21st Century, INURA - Birkhauser, Basel-Boston-Berlin 2004
- Magnaghi, Alberto, Le Territoire des Habitants: pour un Projet Local Durable, Fondation Jan Tanghe, Brugge 2001
- Charter for a New Municipium , a collective agreement among Local Authorities, scientists and social committees for the promotion of a Fair and Non-hierarchical Bottom-up Globalization
- Magnaghi, Alberto, "The 'Territorialist' Approach to Local Self-Sustainable Development", Plurimondi, Dedalo, Rome 2000
- Magnaghi, Alberto, “Territorial Heritage: A Genetic Code for Sustainable Development”, in INURA (ed.), Possible Urban Worlds: Urban Strategies at the End of the 20th Century, Birkhäuser, Basel/Boston/Berlin 1998

== More References in Italian language ==
- Magnaghi, Alberto, Il Principio Territoriale, Bollati Boringhieri, Turin 2020
- Magnaghi, Alberto (ed.), La Regola e il Progetto. Un Approccio Bioregionalista alla Pianificazione del Territorio, Firenze University Press, Florence 2014
- Ferraresi, Giorgio, Rossi-Doria, Bernardo, "Scenari Strategici come Progetto di Territorio: Contributi alla Definizione della Scuola Territorialista", in Magnaghi, Alberto (ed.), Scenari Strategici. Visioni Identitarie per il Progetto di Territorio, Alinea, Florence 2007
- Magnaghi, Alberto (ed.), La Rappresentazione Identitaria del Territorio, Alinea, Florence 2005
- Magnaghi, Alberto, Il Progetto Locale, Bollati Boringhieri, Turin 2000
- Magnaghi, Alberto (ed.), Il Territorio degli Abitanti: Società Locali e Sostenibilità, Dunod, Milan 1998
- Magnaghi, Alberto (ed.), Il Territorio dell'Abitare: lo Sviluppo Locale come Alternativa Strategica, Franco Angeli, Milan 1990
